= John E. Lange =

American diplomat (born 1948)

John Lange
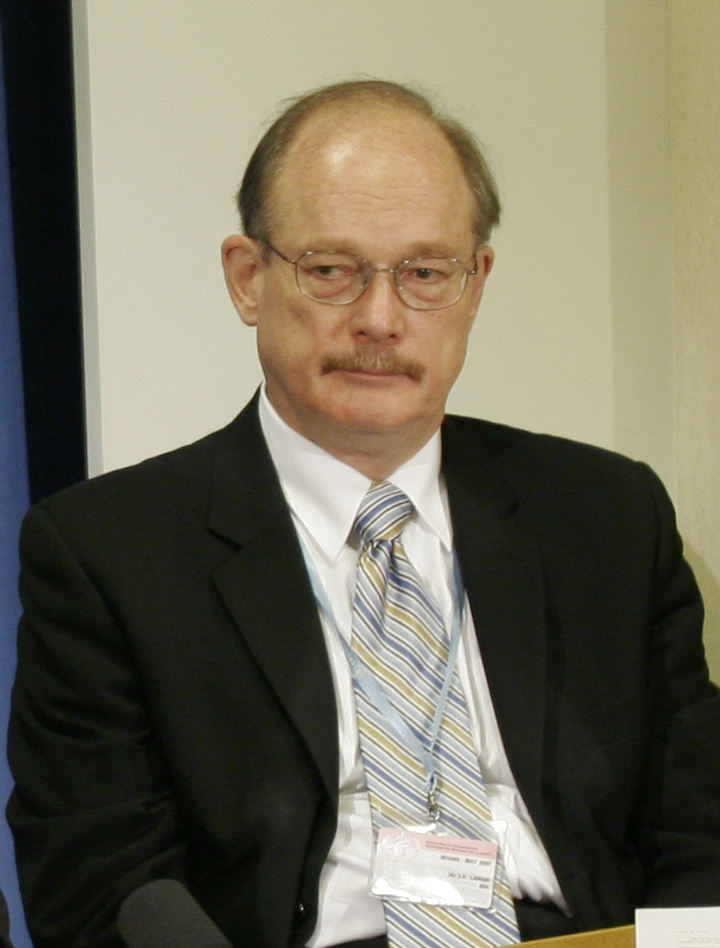

Special Representative on Avian and Pandemic Influenza
- In office March 5, 2006 – February 2009
- President: George W. Bush; Barack Obama
- Preceded by: Position established
- Succeeded by: Kerri-Ann Jones

Inspector General of the Department of State (Acting)
- In office August 3, 2004 – August 23, 2004
- President: George W. Bush
- Preceded by: Anne W. Patterson (Acting)
- Succeeded by: Cameron Hume (Acting)

United States Ambassador to Botswana
- In office December 15, 1999 – August 8, 2002
- President: Bill Clinton; George W. Bush
- Preceded by: Bob Krueger
- Succeeded by: Joseph Huggins

United States Ambassador to Tanzania (Acting)
- In office January 1998 – September 17, 1998
- President: Bill Clinton
- Preceded by: Brady Anderson
- Succeeded by: Charles Stith

Personal details
- Born: 1948 (age 77–78)
- Education: University of Wisconsin, Madison (BA, JD); National Defense University (MS)

John E. Lange (born 1948) was the "United States Avian Influenza and Pandemic Ambassador".

== Education ==
In 1975 he graduated cum laude from the University of Wisconsin Law School and was admitted to the bar in Wisconsin (and to the New York bar in 1979). He is a "distinguished graduate" of the National War College of National Defense University (1996).

== State Department ==
Ambassador John E. Lange retired from the Foreign Service in February 2009. Prior to retirement, John served in the U.S. Department of State as the Special Representative on Avian and Pandemic Influenza, Deputy Inspector General, Deputy Global AIDS Coordinator, and Associate Dean for Leadership and Management at the Foreign Service Institute. Earlier, he served as U.S. Ambassador to Botswana. As Chargé d'Affaires, he led the American Embassy in Dar es Salaam at the time of the terrorist bombing on August 7, 1998. He worked for the Global Health Program of the Bill & Melinda Gates Foundation from 2009 to 2013. He began work at the United Nations Foundation in 2013. He and his wife have one daughter, who grew up in Togo, Switzerland, Tanzania, Botswana, and Northern Virginia and who received the FSYF's Una Chapman Cox Award for Domestic Community Service in 2005.

== United Nations Foundation ==
Ambassador John E. Lange (Ret.) serves as the United Nations Foundation’s Senior Fellow for Global Health Diplomacy and as the primary focal point for the UN foundation's global health diplomacy activities. A pioneer in the field of global health diplomacy and a leader in pandemic preparedness and response, he has held leadership positions in the Global Polio Eradication Initiative and the Measles & Rubella Initiative.

Diplomatic posts
| Preceded by Brady Anderson | United States Ambassador to Tanzania; Acting; 1998 | Succeeded by Charles Stith |
| Preceded by Bob Krueger | United States Ambassador to Botswana; 1999–2002 | Succeeded by Joseph Huggins |
