= Chris Liddell =

New Zealand-born American businessman and philanthropist (born 1958)

Chris Liddell CNZM
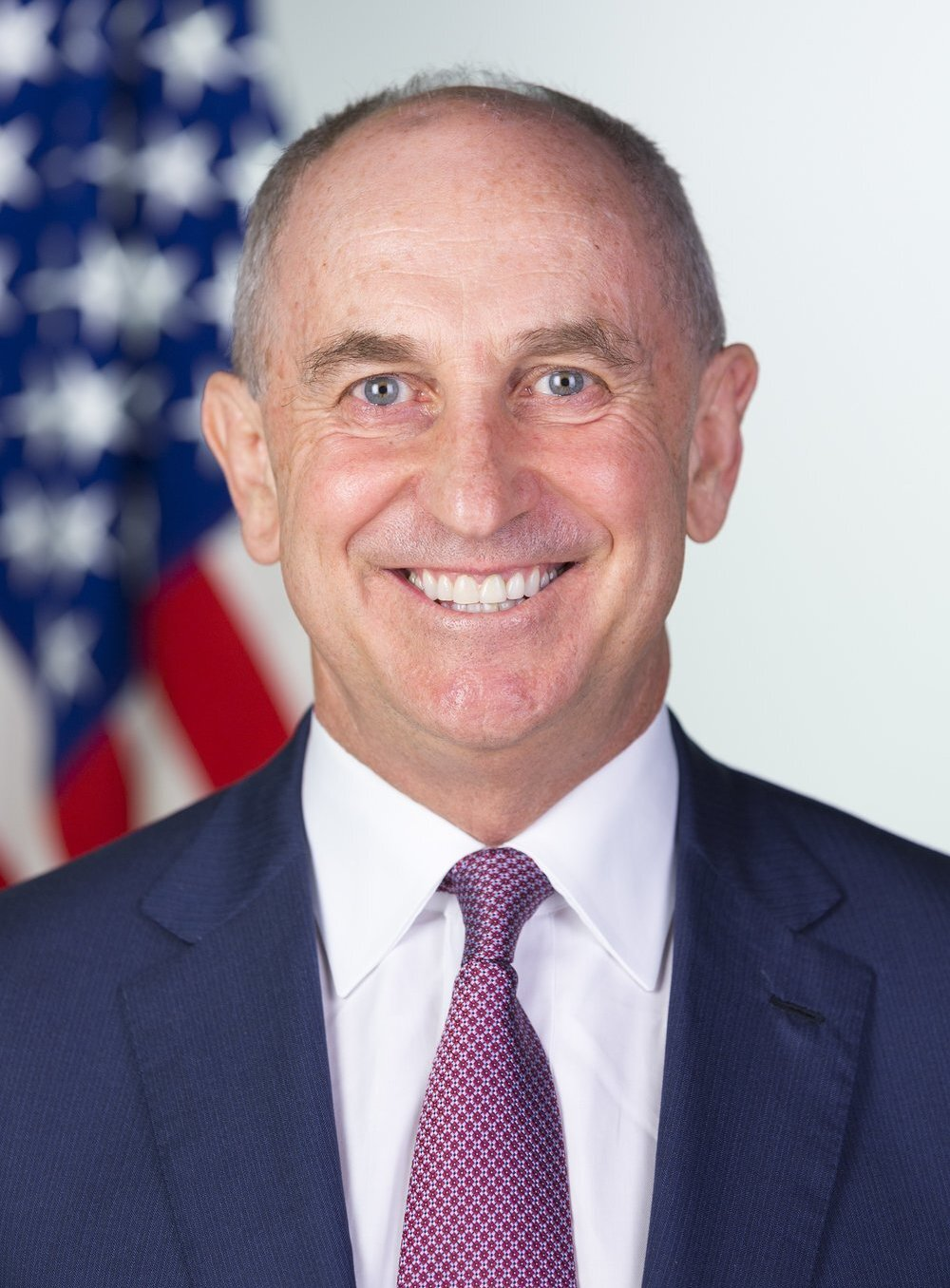
- Official portrait, 2017

White House Deputy Chief of Staff for Policy Coordination
- In office 19 March 2018 – 20 January 2021
- President: Donald Trump
- Preceded by: Rick Dearborn (Policy)
- Succeeded by: Bruce Reed (Policy)

Personal details
- Born: Christopher Pell Liddell; 24 April 1958 (age 68) Matamata, New Zealand
- Citizenship: United States; New Zealand
- Party: Republican
- Spouse: Renee Harbers Liddell (m. 2011)
- Education: University of Auckland (BE); Worcester College, Oxford (MPhil)

Christopher Pell Liddell CNZM (born 24 April 1958) is a New Zealand-American businessperson, author and philanthropist who is currently a director of Anthropic, Commonwealth Fusion Systems and the Council on Foreign Relations. He is also currently pursuing a Doctor of Philosophy at Oxford University. He has served as chief financial officer of Microsoft, the vice chairman of General Motors, senior vice president and CFO of International Paper and the White House deputy chief of staff in the first Trump administration.

Liddell is active in a number of philanthropic projects, mostly in his native New Zealand, where he chairs the country’s largest environmental foundation and in the 2016 New Year Honours, he was appointed a Companion of the New Zealand Order of Merit for services to business and philanthropy.

== Biography ==
Liddell was born in Matamata, New Zealand, the youngest of five siblings. His father was a school teacher and died while Liddell was young. His mother supported Liddell and his siblings by working a variety of jobs, including at Smith & Caughey's in Auckland. Liddell received his secondary education at Mount Albert Grammar School. He holds a Bachelor of Engineering degree with honors from the University of Auckland and a Master of Philosophy degree from Worcester College, Oxford University. He was named one of Auckland University's Distinguished Alumni in 2003.

=== Family ===
He has been married to Renee Harbers Liddell, since 2011.

== Career ==
=== Corporate ===
In 1983, Liddell took up a position at investment bank Jarden & Co which would morph into Credit Suisse First Boston's operation in New Zealand and finally Jarden today. He rose to the role of joint-CEO and managing director of CS First Boston NZ.

In 1995, he joined Carter Holt Harvey as chief financial officer. Four years later he was chief executive officer - the first New Zealander to be appointed by majority shareholder International Paper, which had previously sent Americans David Oskin and John Faraci down to head the company. When Liddell left Carter Holt Harvey, the company was New Zealand's largest forest owner managing around 330,000 hectares and the country's second largest listed company by market capitalization, with sales of NZ$3.75 billion.

From 2003, Liddell served as CFO of Carter Holt Harvey's parent company International Paper until 2005.

Liddell was a senior vice president and CFO of Microsoft, where, from 2005 to December 2009, he was responsible for leading their worldwide finance organization. He oversaw Microsoft's acquisition strategy and helped to transform the company by tripling the rate of acquisitions. Under his leadership, Microsoft completed nearly 50 deals in just three years, ranging from small technology firms to the $6 billion acquisition of digital advertising firm aQuantive.

In 2007, he was ranked among the best CFO’s within the software sector globally by Institutional Investor and then in 2010, he was named the New Zealand Business Leader of the Year by the New Zealand Herald.

Liddell served as vice chairman and chief financial officer at General Motors, where he managed the company’s $23 billion IPO in November 2010, which, at that time, which was the largest public offering in history. “Chris was a major contributor during a pivotal time in the company’s history”, said Daniel Akerson, former GM chairman and CEO. In 2010, GM posted a full-year profit that was its first since 2004 and its largest since 1999.

In 2014, Xero, the cloud-based accounting software developer appointed Liddell as its new chairman. Xero's chief executive and founder Rod Drury said Liddell’s contribution had seen the New Zealand-founded company’s annualized committed monthly revenue (ACMR) triple during his tenure, stating “Chris leaves us in a good position with strong global revenue growth.” Liddell resigned from the New Zealand-based company to take on a new role in United States president-elect Donald Trump's administration.

From 2014 to 2016, he worked as the CFO of Endeavor, a privately held company in the media, sports and entertainment industry.

In 2025, Commonwealth Fusion Systems announced that Liddell would be joining the Board of Directors.

Liddell is also a senior adviser at KKR & Co..

In 2026, Anthropic announced that Liddell would be joining the Board of Directors alongside Dario Amodei, Daniela Amodei, Yasmin Razavi, Jay Kreps, and Reed Hastings. Announcing the appointment, Anthropic Co-founder and President Daniela Amodei said “Chris has spent his career at the intersection of technology, public service, and governance—and has a track record of helping organizations get those things right when the stakes are highest,” As AI’s impact on society grows, that kind of judgement and experience is exactly what we seek on our board." The appointment was widely reported, coming a day after Anthropic announced a US$30 billion funding round at a US$380 billion valuation.

=== Government ===
In 2012, Liddell was executive director of transition planning for the Romney Presidential Campaign and helped author The Romney Readiness Project, a comprehensive presidential transition guide. In 2013, Romney Readiness Project 2012: Retrospectives and Lessons Learned was published. In the foreword, Romney wrote, "My campaign was not successful but our Readiness Project team was."

Liddell advocates for a new approach to presidential transitions called the "Five-Year Presidency". He suggests that presidential candidates should view their term not just as a constitutional four-year term, but as a five-year journey that launches at least a year before the election. Liddell proposes that candidates should focus on key tasks during this "Year Zero" to set themselves up for success, such as assembling a leadership team and preparing for crises.

In January 2017, he was appointed as assistant to the president for strategic initiatives in Donald Trump's White House, He was appointed to the Office of American Innovation (OAI) when it was established on 27 March 2017, where he was focusing on federal IT modernization. He opted to receive the minimum salary required to get health insurance, $30,000. He was also appointed director of the American Technology Council and was a member of the White House Coronavirus Task Force. In March 2018 he was picked to replace Rick Dearborn as White House Deputy Chief of Staff for Policy. In his White House roles he has coordinated administration policy around a number of technology issues, in particular relating to cyber security, and to the Industries of the Future, which include Artificial Intelligence, 5G, Advanced Manufacturing, Quantum Computing and Synthetic Biology.

He served as the White House lead for the Trillion Trees Initiative, part of the Trillion Tree Campaign, which aims to conserve, restore, and grow a trillion trees around the world by 2030. President Trump signed an Executive Order "Establishing the One Trillion Trees Interagency Council" in October 2020. Liddell oversaw the Administration's contribution, and represented the White House during its engagements with 1t.org and the 1t.org Stakeholder Council.

In October 2020 he was nominated by Donald Trump to be the next secretary-general of the OECD. On 20 January 2021, the OECD confirmed that Liddell had withdrawn his nomination to serve as the secretary-general of the OECD.

New Zealand's government did not make a decision to support the nomination. The left-wing Green Party of Aotearoa New Zealand said he should be rejected as his work for Trump had eroded multilateral approaches in the Paris Agreement and the World Health Organization. The right-wing New Zealand National Party said it would be in New Zealand's interest to have a "boy from Matamata" in the role, but later reversed their support for Liddell.

Prior to the 2021 inauguration Liddell called for legislation that "allows a provisional ascertainment to occur so that an incoming administration [and] the president-elect can get security briefings for a lot of the time-sensitive issues regardless of whether the formal election has been settled or not."

Liddell reportedly considered resigning after the January 6 United States Capitol attack in Washington D.C., but announced he would stay on to ensure a smooth transition to President-elect Joe Biden. Liddell had a key role in the transition.

David Marchick elaborated on Liddell’s role in the tumult of the transition in his book The Peaceful Transfer of Power: An Oral History of America’s Presidential Transitions, noting that while Presidential transitions are incredibly complicated endeavors in the best of circumstances, Liddell had “kept order, done heroic work in an impossible environment.”

Author, documentary filmmaker, and White House historian Chris Whipple, in a preview chapter on the transition from his book on the Biden White House, The Fight of His Life, published in Vanity Fair, said that Liddell “helped make the transfer of power possible, becoming an unlikely leader of a plot to save democracy.”

Liddell's book Year Zero: The Five-Year Presidency explores the crucial elements of building and operating an effective White House, emphasizing its pivotal role in the success of a presidency and the democratic process in the United States. Drawing on his experience as the former White House Deputy Chief of Staff, Liddell provides a strategic framework for a strong presidency. The book, published by the University of Virginia Press, offers concrete, nonpartisan steps to improve White House functionality and rebuild trust in this fundamental institution.

In the Time essay How Rocky Presidential Transitions Put America at Risk, Liddell explores the national security risks inherent in political transitions. Liddell draws attention to historical examples and underscores the need for proactive planning by presidential candidates. He advocates for early submission of national security team nominees and emphasizes the importance of cooperation between outgoing and incoming teams to effectively address potential crises.

Liddell has also written several opinion pieces on issues such as the future of the use of Artificial Intelligence.

== Affiliations ==
Liddell is founding chairman of the Next Foundation, a NZD $100 million dollar foundation in New Zealand focused on environmental and education projects. Next has funded projects such as Project Taranaki Mounga, a ten-year project to control pests and re-introduce nature birds in the 34,000 ha of Egmont National Park, and Predator Free Wellington City, a partnership to make Wellington the first predator free capital in the world. Liddell was a signatory to the Tomorrow Accord, an agreement between the New Zealand government and NEXT to focus on large scale ecological restoration projects, and commit to maintaining their ecological benefits in perpetuity.

In 2001, Liddell was on the conference committee for the Catching the Knowledge Wave project, one of the biggest meeting of minds to take place in New Zealand history. The conference hosted about 450 academics, officials, politicians, economists and business leaders who discussed ways of lifting New Zealand’s economic performance. Led by the New Zealand prime minister and the vice chancellor of the University of Auckland, it was a catalyst for the realization that New Zealand could no longer remain primarily a producer of agricultural commodities but instead transform itself to a high-value, knowledge-based economy.

In 2006, he was a recipient of the Kea World Class New Zealand Award.

In 2008, Liddell was patron of the University of Auckland’s inaugural Leading the Way fundraising campaign. The campaign sought to raise NZD $100 million to support teaching, research and community service activities and eventually achieved NZD $120 million in philanthropic support.

He was chairman of Project Crimson, a conservation group, and was active in a number of environmental projects in New Zealand, such as the restoration of Rotoroa Island and the Abel Tasman National Park. Liddell was a founding trustee of Pure Advantage, a registered New Zealand charity, which supports a broad range of sustainability, regenerative and green growth-focused research activities.

Liddell established the Liddell Scholarship at Mount Albert Grammar School in 2008 to recognise outstanding all-round students and provide financial support for their university studies. In 2017, Liddell and his brother, John, donated $1 million to Mount Albert Grammar primarily to fund teacher and pupil scholarships. Later that year, Liddell donated $450,000 to Auckland University to fund a postgraduate scholarship to Worcester College, Oxford.

In 2021, Liddell joined the Blavatnik School of Government on a Transformational Leadership Fellowship. In 2022, Karthik Ramanna and Liddell raised philanthropic funding to help drive further carbon accounting pilots of the E-liability accounting method, resulting in the creation of the E-liability Institute, where Liddell serves as chairman. Additionally, Liddell is a visiting research fellow at Green Templeton College, Oxford. Liddell is also a Practitioner Senior Fellow at Miller Center of Public Affairs.

Liddell has served as trustee of the New Zealand Sports Foundation and as a director of the New Zealand Rugby Union. He was the driving force behind the purchase of Peter Snell's 1964 Tokyo Olympics running singlet for Te Papa Museum. He spearheaded and funded a campaign to assemble and publicly display the most important All Black jerseys in the team's 120-year history. In addition to his administrative and philanthropic contributions to sports, Liddell also personally completed an Ironman triathlon in 1995.

In partnership with New Zealand Rugby and Oxford University RFC, Liddell established the Liddell Oxford Rugby Scholarship to support New Zealand rugby players transitioning beyond professional sport; the inaugural recipient was former Māori All Blacks and Hurricanes player Reed Prinsep, who was awarded the scholarship to study at the University of Oxford.

In 2026, Liddell was named a fellow at the Institute of Politics at Harvard University, where he stated he would "deepen and extend" his work on political transitions in the United States and other democracies.

Political offices
| Preceded by Rick Dearborn | White House Deputy Chief of Staff for Policy; 2018–2021 | Succeeded by Jen O'Malley Dillon; Bruce Reed |
