= Claude G. Ross =

American diplomat

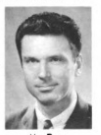

US Ambassador to the Central African Republic
- In office August 1, 1963 – April 22, 1967
- President: John F. Kennedy; Lyndon B. Johnson
- Preceded by: John H. Burns
- Succeeded by: Geoffrey W. Lewis

US Ambassador to Haiti
- In office April 19, 1967 – October 17, 1969
- President: Lyndon B. Johnson
- Preceded by: Benson E.L. Timmons III
- Succeeded by: Clinton E. Knox

US Ambassador to Tanzania
- In office October 9, 1969 – June 25, 1972
- President: Richard Nixon
- Preceded by: John H. Burns
- Succeeded by: W. Beverly Carter, Jr.

Personal details
- Born: October 26, 1917
- Died: January 18, 2006 (aged 88)
- Education: Huntington Park High School; University of Southern California; National War College

Claude Gordon Anthony "Tony" Ross (October 26, 1917 - January 18, 2006) was an American diplomat. He served as the US Ambassador to the Central African Republic, Haiti, and Tanzania.

== Early life and education ==
Ross was born in Chicago, Illinois in 1917 to Grace Faulkner and Claude Ross. The family moved to southern California when Ross was an infant. Ross' interest in the foreign service started young. He was fascinated with geography from a young age and collected foreign stamps.

He graduated from Huntington Park High School and received a scholarship to the University of Southern California (USC). While attending USC, he worked for the Los Angeles Daily Newspaper from 1934 to 1935. Ross graduated summa cum laude from USC in 1939 with a bachelor's degree in International Relations. He was a member of Phi Beta Kappa. The School of International Relations at USC was headed by Claude A. Buss, an ex-Foreign Service Officer (FSO). Ross was the first graduate of the program to become a US ambassador.

Ross married Antigone Andrea Peterson in 1940 and they had two children: Christopher W. S. Ross and Geoffrey Faulkner Ross. Ross learned Greek to marry his wife, a prerequisite of his father-in-law.

Ross was proficient in four different languages: French, Spanish, Greek, and German. He passed his skills in language on to his son, Christopher W. S. Ross, who also served as an ambassador; Christopher Ross was renowned as the most fluent non-native Arabic speaker in the Foreign Service during his career.

== Foreign Service career ==
Ross joined the Foreign Service in 1940. He took the examination in French, Spanish, and German, getting a perfect score in all three. However, he failed the physical examination the first time and was forced to retake it a few months later. After becoming an FSO, Ross worked in Mexico City, Quito, Athens, Nouméa, Beirut, Cairo, and Conakry. He attended the National War College from 1956 to 1957.

Ross was appointed the second US ambassador to the Central African Republic (CAR) by John F. Kennedy in 1963. During Ross' time in the CAR, the country was legally independent of France but France remained deeply entrenched in the CAR's government and foreign policy. In 1966, there was a brief coup d'état which broke the CAR's relations with communist China.

A year after the coup, Ross was nominated to the ambassadorship in Haiti by Lyndon B. Johnson. Haiti's president and an infamous despot, François Duvalier or Papa Doc, reported liked Ross despite his orders to maintain "correct but cool relations."

In 1969, Ross received a call from John H Burns, the US ambassador to Tanzania, asking him if he wanted the job. Ross preferred a position in Latin America, but reluctantly agreed. A few months later, an informal offer came for the ambassadorship to Venezuela, but by then it was too late, and Ross went to Tanzania instead. He was the US ambassador to Tanzania until 1972.

After his tour as US ambassador to Tanzania came to an end, Ross returned to Washington and was promoted to Deputy Assistant Secretary of State for African Affairs. During his time in this position, the big problem for the Bureau of African Affairs was Idi Amin, the brutal dictator of Uganda. They made the decision to pull the American ambassador out of Uganda during Amin's rule.

Ross retired from the Foreign Service in 1974 but continued to work for the State Department as a senior inspector of embassies for twelve years.

== Retirement ==
In retirement, Ross remained involved in the foreign service community. He was chairman of the Committee on Education of the American Foreign Service Association and served as the President and Honorary Governor of Diplomatic and Consular Officers, Retired (DACOR). From DACOR, Ross received the Foreign Service Cup, an award for outstanding retirees, in 1986. He also volunteered with Sister Cities International. Ross died in 2006 of pneumonia in Washington D.C. After his death, DACOR awarded Ross with its Award for Exceptional Contributions.
