= Geoffrey Lewis =

Geoffrey Lewis may refer to:

- Geoffrey Lewis (actor) (1935–2015), American character actor
- Geoffrey Lewis (scholar) (1920–2008), British professor of Turkish
- Geoffrey Lewis (philatelist), Australian philatelist
- Geoffrey W. Lewis (died 1992), American diplomat

== See also ==
- Geoff Lewis, Welsh jockey
- Jeffrey Lewis (disambiguation)
