= Richard Noyes Viets =

American diplomat

Richard Noyes Viets (born November 10, 1930) represented the United States as Ambassador to Tanzania in 1979, Jordan in 1981, and nominated to be Ambassador to Portugal in 1987 but the Senate did not act upon his nomination.

While his nomination was being considered by the Senate Foreign Relations Committee, Senator Jesse Helms and Claiborne Pell locked horns. Helms had several issues with Viets including “grievances filed against Mr. Viets by three junior diplomats and allegations that he may not have paid taxes owed in the United States.”

Viets entered the Foreign Service in 1955 and retired in 1987.

Diplomatic posts
Preceded by James W. Spain	U.S. Ambassador to Tanzania; 1979–1981	Succeeded by David Charles Miller, Jr.
Preceded by Nicholas A. Veliotes	U.S. Ambassador to Jordan; 1981–1984	Succeeded by Paul H. Boeker
