= Robert P. Smith (ambassador) =

American diplomat

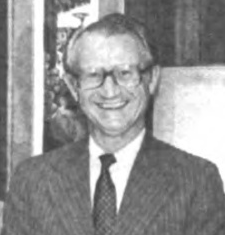

United States Ambassador to Liberia
- In office July 2, 1979 – January 15, 1981
- President: Jimmy Carter
- Preceded by: W. Beverly Carter Jr.
- Succeeded by: William L. Swing

United States Ambassador to Ghana
- In office October 4, 1976 – May 7, 1979
- President: Gerald Ford
- Preceded by: Shirley Temple Black
- Succeeded by: Thomas W. M. Smith

United States Ambassador to Malta
- In office July 23, 1974 – October 29, 1976
- President: Richard Nixon
- Preceded by: John I. Getz
- Succeeded by: Bruce Laingen

Personal details
- Born: March 5, 1929
- Died: January 20, 2012 (aged 82)

Military service
- Allegiance: United States
- Branch/service: United States Marine Corps

Robert Powell Smith (March 5, 1929 – January 20, 2012) was an American diplomat.

== Early life ==
Smith was born on March 5, 1929, to parents Powell Augusta and Estella M. Smith.

== Military career ==
Smith served in the United States Marine Corps.

== Diplomatic career ==
Smith was appointed by President Richard Nixon on July 23, 1974, to the position of United States Ambassador to Malta. The presentation of his credentials for this position occurred on September 24, 1974. The termination of this mission occurred on October 29, 1976. Smith was then appointed by President Gerald Ford on October 4, 1976, to the position of United States Ambassador to Ghana. The presentation of his credentials for this position occurred on December 17, 1976. The termination of this mission occurred on May 7, 1979. Smith's final diplomatic appointment was made by President Jimmy Carter on July 2, 1979, for the position of United States Ambassador to Liberia. The presentation of his credentials for this position occurred on August 6, 1979. The termination of this final mission occurred on January 15, 1981.

== Personal life ==
Smith resided in both Texas and Virginia.

== Death ==
Smith died on January 20, 2012. He was interred in the Arlington National Cemetery.
