= Katie Walsh (politician) =

American political operative (born 1984)

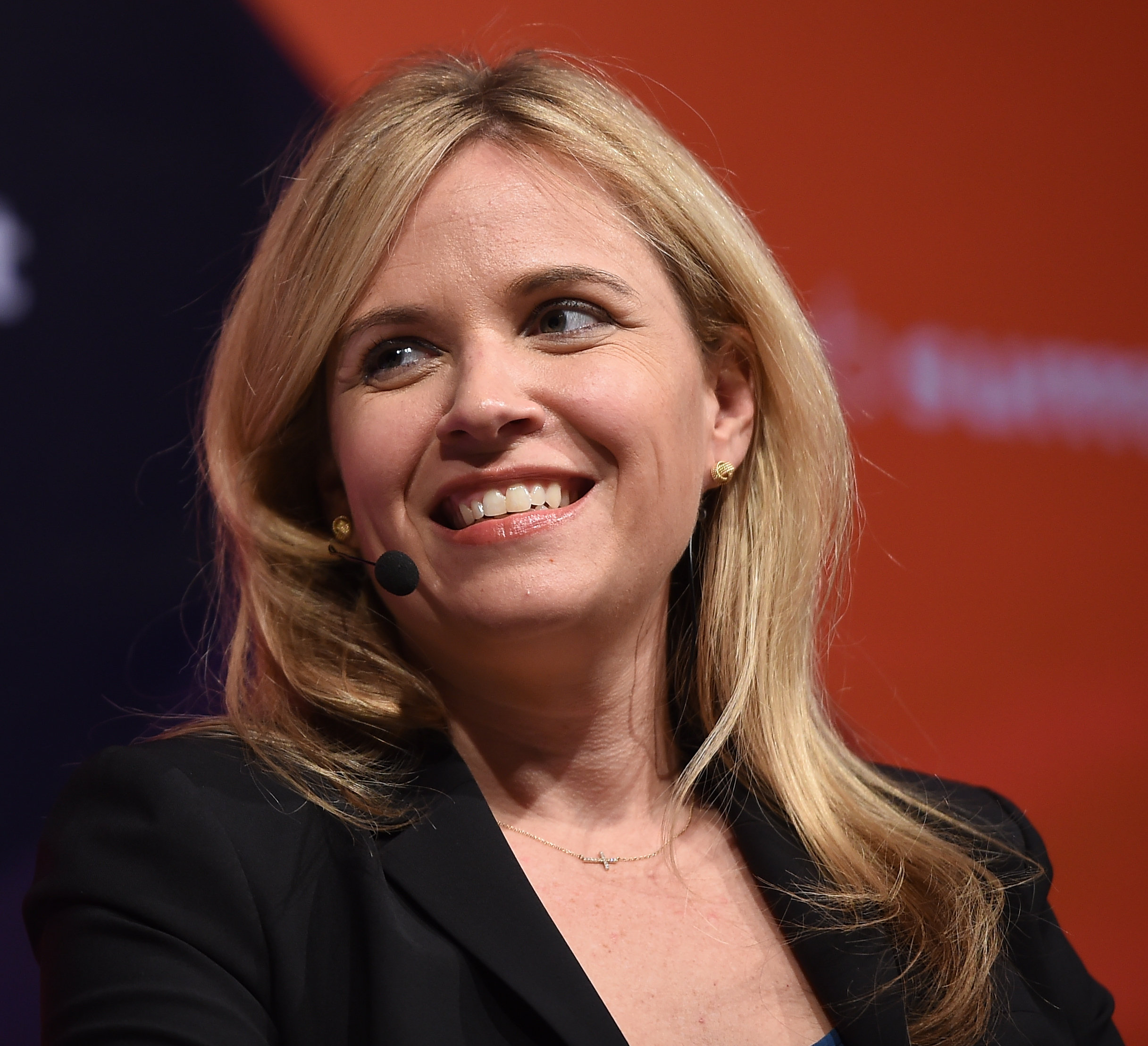
- Walsh in 2017

White House Deputy Chief of Staff for Implementation
- In office January 20, 2017 – March 30, 2017
- President: Donald Trump
- Preceded by: Kristie Canegallo (Policy Implementation)
- Succeeded by: Kirstjen Nielsen (Principal Deputy); Natalie Quillian (2023) (Implementation)

Personal details
- Born: Katherine Marie Walsh; November 1, 1984 (age 42) St. Louis, Missouri, U.S.
- Party: Republican
- Spouse: Mike Shields
- Education: George Washington University (BA)

Katherine Marie Walsh (born November 1, 1984) is an American Republican political operative who served as White House Deputy Chief of Staff for Implementation in the Donald Trump administration. She also worked with the Trump-aligned 501(c)(4) advocacy organization America First Policies.

Walsh previously served as the Chief of Staff for the Republican National Committee. She joined the Republican National Committee as Deputy Finance Director in January 2013 and became Finance Director in June of that year. In her previous role as Deputy Finance Director for the National Republican Senatorial Committee, she worked with United States Senate campaigns across the country to implement comprehensive fundraising and campaign strategies. Her past experience also includes serving as Midwest Regional Finance Director for the McCain–Palin campaign in 2008 and working for Friends of Fred Thompson, at the Ashcroft Group, and as a field representative for Missourians for Matt Blunt.

== Early life and education ==
Walsh was born an only child in St. Louis, Missouri. She credits her early interest in politics to her mother, who she said worked on a county executive race in Missouri when she was seven or eight. Her early political involvement came in high school when she worked as an intern for then-Senator John Ashcroft's unsuccessful 2000 reelection campaign. She attended Visitation Academy of St. Louis, a private, all-girls, Roman Catholic high school, and graduated in 2003. She was a field representative for Matt Blunt's 2004 campaign for Governor of Missouri. She also worked as an administrative assistant for the consulting firm Ashcroft Group.

Walsh graduated from George Washington University with degrees in marketing and finance in 2007.

== Career ==
=== 2008 presidential election ===
Walsh was hired in 2007 as an assistant to the finance director for Fred Thompson's brief presidential campaign.

After Thompson dropped out of the race, she joined the presidential campaign of John McCain as Midwest regional finance director.

=== National Republican Senatorial Committee ===
Walsh then worked as deputy finance director for the National Republican Senatorial Committee (NRSC), implementing fundraising and political strategies for Senate campaigns during the 2010 and 2012 election cycles.

=== Republican National Committee ===
Walsh was hired as deputy finance director for the Republican National Committee in January 2013 and rose to finance director that June. At the RNC, Walsh was known as a "rainmaker", breaking records by raising over $200 million during the 2014 election cycle.

Walsh was named chief of staff of the Republican National Committee in early 2015, serving under chair Reince Priebus. She was critical of the RNC's practice of sharing voter information with the Koch Brothers, saying "I think it's very dangerous and wrong to allow a group of very strong, well-financed individuals who have no accountability to anyone to have control over who gets access to the data when, why and how." Spearheaded by the RNC's technology chief Andrew Barkett for the 2014 election cycle, she ensured that a partnership began in July 2015 between the voter information in the RNC's Data Trust, operated by Karl Rove and developed by Johnny DeStefano, and the voter information in the Americans for Prosperity and Freedom Partners' i360, which is supported by the Koch Brothers network, so that each database's information would be shared with GOP candidates. The RNC's Data Trust had been sharing its information with the independent groups American Crossroads and American Action Network. The extensive personal information in both i360 and Data Trust are developed from credit card use and internet choices such as credit card purchases, cable TV choices, and other sensitive personal information, much more personal than Facebook data. During the 2016 election cycle, Walsh was an architect of the Republican National Committee's get out the vote and voter identification operations. She focused on using the Republican National Committee's data collection from the previous four years. She told CNN that the RNC intended to look to polls less often in favor of "predictive modeling", which tracks voters' likelihood of voting for Republican candidates. In November 2016, she said, "The beauty of predictive modeling is you're watching an electorate voter-by-voter over a long period of time ... You're watching their movement, you're watching what they care about, you're watching what they respond to to [sic] and there are a lot of upsides to this." She went on to say that the Republican National Committee was also focusing on get out the vote efforts for Donald Trump's presidential campaign. Walsh selected Alex Lundry's political marketing firm Deep Root Analytics to provide data analytics to the Trump campaign, along with TargetPoint Consulting and Causeway Solutions.

=== Donald Trump presidential transition team ===
Walsh was a member of Donald Trump's 2016 presidential transition team. The transition team was a group of around 100 aides, policy experts, government affairs officials, and former government officials who were tasked with vetting, interviewing, and recommending individuals for top cabinet and staff roles in Trump's administration. She was part of the Leadership staff.

=== Trump administration ===
Walsh was named White House Deputy Chief of Staff for Implementation in the administration of Donald Trump. Walsh oversaw senior staff and managed scheduling and the Office of Public Liaison. According to The Wall Street Journal, Walsh had guarded access to the Oval Office on behalf of Chief of Staff Reince Priebus.

Walsh resigned from her position on March 30, 2017, becoming an adviser to a pro-Trump 501(c)(4), America First Policies, and the Republican National Committee.

Political offices
Preceded by Kristie Canegallo as White House Deputy Chief of Staff for Policy Implementation	White House Deputy Chief of Staff for Implementation; 2017	Succeeded by Kirstjen Nielsen as White House Principal Deputy Chief of Staff
