= Rick Dearborn =

American government official (born 1965)

White House Deputy Chief of Staff for Policy
- In office January 20, 2017 – March 16, 2018
- President: Donald Trump
- Preceded by: Kristie Canegallo (Policy Implementation)
- Succeeded by: Chris Liddell

Assistant Secretary of Energy for Congressional and Intergovernmental Affairs
- In office 2003–2004
- President: George W. Bush
- Preceded by: Dan Brouillette
- Succeeded by: Jill Sigal

Personal details
- Born: Ricky Allen Dearborn; July 19, 1965 (age 61)
- Party: Republican
- Spouse: Gina Dearborn
- Education: University of Oklahoma (BA)

Ricky "Rick" Allen Dearborn (born July 19, 1965) is an American government official and lobbyist who served as the White House Deputy Chief of Staff for Legislative, Intergovernmental Affairs and Implementation in the first administration of U.S. President Donald Trump for less than a year from 2017 to 2018. Prior to this role, he was the executive director of Donald Trump's 2016 presidential transition team and served in various positions on the U.S. Senate staff.

== Career ==
Dearborn worked for six U.S. Senators, including two members of Senate leadership, and spent more than 25 years working on Capitol Hill. He was nominated by President George W. Bush and confirmed by the Senate to become the Assistant Secretary for Congressional Affairs at the United States Department of Energy, where he worked with the Senate, House, and Tribal Governments on achieving President George W. Bush's Energy Agenda. After leaving the Department of Energy in 2004, Dearborn worked as the Chief of Staff for Senator Jeff Sessions from 2005 to 2017. He succeeded Armand DeKeyser.

Dearborn was one of two former senior Sessions staffers appointed to senior roles in the Trump White House, the other being White House Senior Advisor Stephen Miller.

== Trump administration ==
=== Presidential transition team ===
Dearborn was a member of Donald Trump's presidential transition team. The transition team was a group of around 100 aides, policy experts, government affairs officials, and former government officials who were tasked with vetting, interviewing, and recommending individuals for top cabinet and staff roles in Trump's administration. Vice President Mike Pence was named Chairman of Transition after Chairman Chris Christie was fired, with Dearborn as staff director.

Dearborn, alongside Marc Short, and Andrew Bremberg, coordinated with aides of Senator Mitch McConnell in employing the Congressional Review Act to reverse 13 regulations made late in the presidency of Barack Obama by creating an Excel spreadsheet of targets, eventually being able to eliminate over twice as many regulations as they had anticipated.

=== White House staff ousted after less than a year ===
Dearborn took a relatively low-key approach while serving in the White House.

On November 10, 2017, Politico reported that "Deputy chief of staff Rick Dearborn's departure would make him the latest in a growing conga line of West Wing aides who started on Inauguration Day but failed to last a full year."

On December 21, 2017, the White House announced that Dearborn would resign in early 2018.

== Post-White House career ==
Dearborn joined a consulting firm after leaving the White House.

In 2023, Dearborn authored the chapter on the White House Office in the Heritage Foundation's Project 2025 book, Mandate for Leadership: The Conservative Promise.

== See also ==
- Timeline of investigations into Trump and Russia (2019)

Political offices
Preceded by Kristie Canegallo as White House Deputy Chief of Staff for Policy Implementation	White House Deputy Chief of Staff for Policy; 2017–2018	Succeeded by Chris Liddell
