= Marion V. Creekmore Jr. =

American diplomat

Marion Virgil Creekmore Jr. (born January 8, 1939) is the distinguished visiting professor of history and political science at Emory University. He also served in the US Foreign Service and then as the United States Ambassador to Sri Lanka and the Republic of Maldives.

== Biography ==
Dr. Marion V. Creekmore Jr. graduated from Vanderbilt University (B.A., 1961) and Tulane University (M.A., 1963; Ph.D., 1968). He was born January 8, 1939, in Memphis, Tennessee. He is married and has two children.

== Career ==
He also served as the deputy Afghan coordinator at the Department of State in Washington, DC. He service history was extended as diplomat in residence at George Washington University, 1988; deputy assistant secretary in the Bureau for Near East and South Asia at the Department of State, 1985–1987; deputy director of the Policy Planning Staff, 1985; deputy chief of mission in India, 1981–1984; and deputy assistant secretary in the Bureau of International Organizations Affairs, 1979 – 1981. In addition, he directed the Office of International Energy Policy at the Department of Energy, 1978, and worked on energy and development issues in the Bureau of Economic and Business Affairs, 1974 – 1977. He also served in South Africa, 1965–1966; Ghana, 1966–1968; and the Federal Republic of Germany, 1970–1973, for the Department of State. He now teaches at Emory University.

Diplomatic posts
Preceded by James W. Spain	U.S. Ambassador to Sri Lanka; 1989–1992	Succeeded by Teresita Currie Schaffer
