= J. Brian Atwood =

American diplomat (born 1942)

Brian Atwood
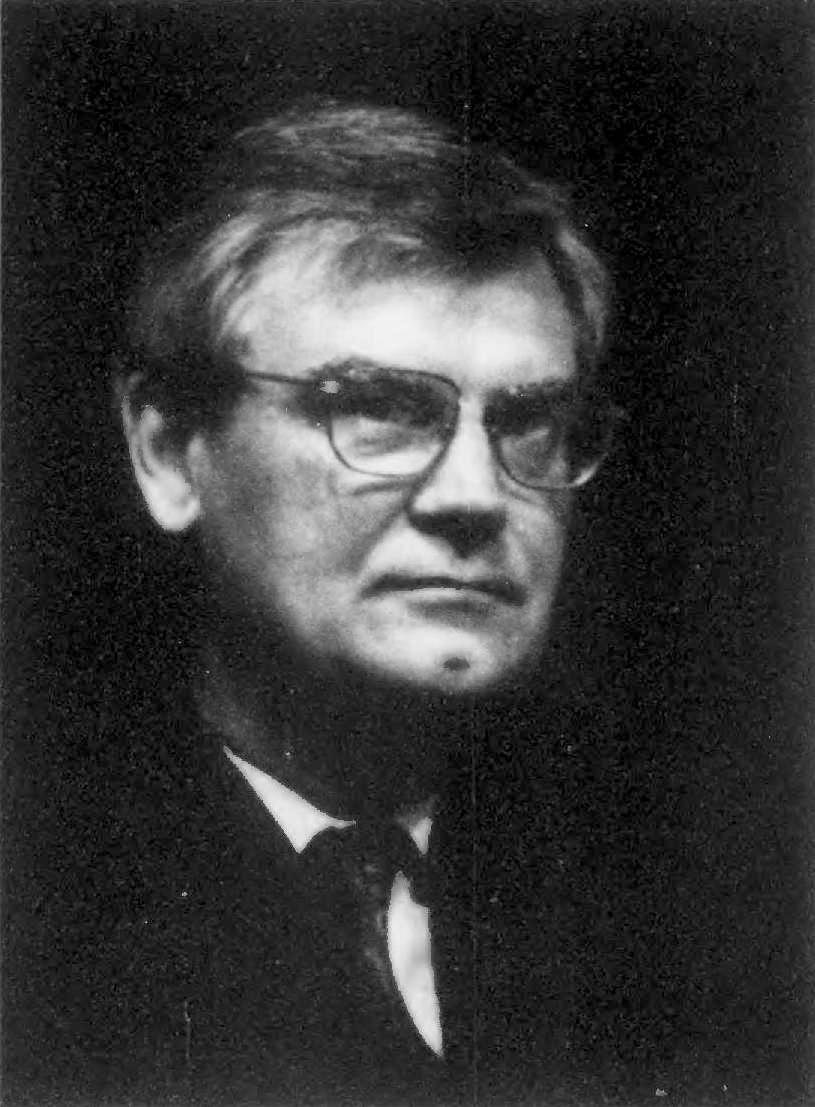
- Atwood in 1997

11th Administrator of the United States Agency for International Development
- In office May 10, 1993 – June 30, 1999
- President: Bill Clinton
- Preceded by: Ronald Roskens
- Succeeded by: J. Brady Anderson

9th Under Secretary of State for Management
- In office April 1, 1993 – May 10, 1993
- President: Bill Clinton
- Preceded by: John F. W. Rogers
- Succeeded by: Richard M. Moose

16th Assistant Secretary of State for Legislative Affairs
- In office August 3, 1979 – January 14, 1981
- President: Jimmy Carter
- Preceded by: Douglas J. Bennet
- Succeeded by: Richard M. Fairbanks

Personal details
- Born: John Brian Atwood; July 25, 1942 (age 83)
- Party: Democratic
- Education: Boston University (BA)
- Awards: Secretary's Distinguished Service Award

John Brian Atwood (born 25 July 1942) is an American diplomat and former Administrator of the U.S. Agency for International Development. From 2002 to 2010, he was dean of the Humphrey School of Public Affairs at the University of Minnesota.

== Biography ==
In 1966, Atwood joined the United States Foreign Service and served as a foreign service officer until January 1972. He served in U.S. embassies in Abidjan Ivory Coast and Spain. From 1979 to 1981 as a presidential appointee, he was Assistant Secretary of State for Congressional Relations during the Carter administration, and also served in the Foreign Service Institute as dean of Professional Studies and Academic Affairs. From 1986 to 1993 he served as the first president of the National Democratic Institute for International Affairs. From 1993 to 1999 he served as Administrator of USAID, receiving the Secretary's Distinguished Service Award from the Department of State.

In 2001, Atwood served on UN Secretary General Kofi Annan's Panel on Peace Operations. He writes frequently on international development, post-conflict reconstruction, foreign policy, the role of the United Nations and other multilateral organizations in international affairs, and the United States' role in the world order.

In 2010 he was nominated by the Obama administration to serve as the chair of the Development Assistance Committee at the Organisation for Economic Co-operation and Development. He was elected unanimously by the 24 member states to chair the committee responsible for coordinating the activities of the bilateral donors. He led diplomatic efforts to create a new Global Partnership for Effective Development Cooperation endorsed by 160 nations, civil society and the private sector. He oversaw the restructuring of the committee, gained consensus for its new policy on engagement with non-members, opened relationships with the emerging economies, advised governments and the OECD Secretary General on a Strategy for Development adopted at OECD ministerial, presided over DAC ministerial and senior-level meetings, and gained consensus agreement on a program of work and budget for the 2013-14 period.

In January 2013, J. Brian Atwood returned to the Hubert H. Humphrey School of Public Affairs as the Chair of Global Policy Studies and Professor of Public Policy at the Hubert H. Humphrey School of Public Affairs, University of Minnesota.

Atwood is the Chair of Population Services International, and he serves on the board of directors of the National Democratic Institute.

He received a bachelor's degree in government and history from Boston University in Boston, Massachusetts, and an honorary doctorate from American University based in Washington D.C. He is a member of the American Academy of Diplomacy and Council on Foreign Relations. Atwood speaks English, French, and Spanish.

== Awards ==
- International Development Council Award for Public Service in Global Leadership, 2001
- Secretary of State's Distinguished Service Award, 1999
- Microenterprise Coalition Award for special contribution, 1999
- U.S. Energy Association Award for Public Service, 1998
- National Conservation Achievement Award presented by National Wildlife Foundation, 1996
- Society for International Development Award for contribution to development cooperation, 1996
- Received Senior Executive Service awards for developing mid-level and counter-terrorism training courses at FSI, 1981–82
- International Citizen of the Year Award, International Leadership Institute, 2010
- University of Minnesota President's Award for Distinguished Service

== Publications ==
- International Innovations, "A Better Future for All," Interview with J. Brian Atwood, January 2013.
- "Go Long, Six Actions to Structurally Address Organized Violence." International Peace Institute (IPI), J. Brian Atwood & Erwin van Veen, December 2012.
- Center for Global Development Essay, "Creating a Global Partnership for Effective Development Cooperation," J. Brian Atwood, October 2012.
- Creating Global Public Value, Chapter in Edited Book on Creating Public Value, to be published Fall 2013.
- Development Cooperation Report 2012, "Lessons Linking Sustainability and Development." Editorial, "Integrating Policy Options to Galvanize Actions for Sustainable Development," J. Brian Atwood Report of the DAC Chair.
- Development Cooperation Report 2011, "Fueling the Future of Development." Report of the DAC Chair J. Brian Atwood, 50th Anniversary Edition.
- Strengthening EU-US Cooperation on Democracy Support, http://blog.lib.umn.edu/gpa/globalnotes/ blog entry, September 17, 2010
- Politique Americaine, Special issue on "Defense, Diplomacy and Development," Interview with J. Brian Atwood, Autumn, 2010;
- North Korea, Minnesota Public Radio NewsQ, May 27, 2010;
- Elevating Development Assistance, National Defense University Journal, PRISM, February 2010;
- Minnesota Public Radio, Your Voice/Commentaries, Political Appointments Have Proper Place in Foreign Service, September 4, 2009
- Too Good to Fail, Minneapolis Star Tribune Op-ed, March 31, 2009;
- Haiti: A Compassionate and Competent Response, Foreign Service Journal, February 2010;
- In Defense of War to Advance Peace: The Obama Paradox, Huffington Post, December 14, 2009;
- Toward a Brighter Future, A Transatlantic Call For Renewed Leadership and Partnerships in Global Development, 2009. German Marshall Fund Transatlantic Taskforce; Co-author
- Why American Foreign Policy Fails: Unsafe at Home and Despised Abroad; Dennis C. Jett, Palgrave Macmillan, 2008; Book review
- Atwood, J. Brian, Natsios, Andrew. The U.S. Has A Scattershot Approach To Global Poverty, Minneapolis Star Tribune Op-ed, September 19, 2008;
- Beyond November, www.undiplomatic.net blog entry, August 7, 2008;
- Foreign Policy Priorities for the Next President, www.connectusfund.org blog entry, July 25, 2008;
- Atwood, J. Brian, McPherson, M. Peter, Natsios, Andrew. Arrested Development: Making Foreign Aid a More Effective Tool. Foreign Affairs, v. 87 no. 6 (November–December 2008).
- The War Powers Resolution in the Age of Terrorism. St. Louis University Law Journal, November 2007.
- The Vital Development Mission. Whitehead Journal of Diplomacy and International Relations, Summer/Fall 2005.
- Set A Deadline For Getting Out. Star-Tribune Op-ed. October 27, 2005.
- Common Ground. Star-Tribune Op-ed. January 9, 2005.
- Atwood, J. Brian, Barnett, Michael. Reduce Poverty- Get A Safer World. Christian Science Monitor. November 18, 2004.
- Atwood, J. Brian, Jacobs, Lawrence. Rare For an Election Year: In 2004, Foreign Policy Matters. Christian Science Monitor. July 2, 2004.
- The G-8 Partnership with Africa, Relevant to All. The World Today (a publication of the Royal Institute for International Studies). June 2004: 26–27.
- How Helping Weakest Can Stave Off Terror. Star-Tribune Op-ed. June 8, 2004.
- The Link Between Poverty and Violent Conflict. New England Journal of Public Policy. v. 19 no. 1 (2004): 159–165.
- The Development Imperative: Creating the Preconditions for Peace. Journal of International Affairs. v. 55 no. 2 (2002): 333–349.

== Notes ==
Political offices
Preceded by Douglas J. Bennet	Assistant Secretary of State for Legislative Affairs; 1979–1981	Succeeded by Richard M. Fairbanks
Preceded by John F. W. Rogers	Under Secretary of State for Management; 1993	Succeeded by Richard M. Moose
Preceded by Ronald Roskens	Administrator of the United States Agency for International Development; 1993–1999	Succeeded by J. Brady Anderson
