= List of ambassadors of the United States to Tanzania =

Ambassador of the United States to Tanzania
- Seal of the United States Department of State

- Flag of a United States ambassador

- Incumbent; William Trachman since October 15, 2026
- Nominator: President of the United States
- Inaugural holder: William K. Leonhart as Ambassador Extraordinary and Plenipotentiary
- Formation: August 22, 1962
- Website: US Embassy - Dar es Salaam

The present country of Tanzania, officially the United Republic of Tanzania, was created upon the union of the formerly independent countries of Tanganyika and the People's Republic of Zanzibar (PRZ).

Tanganyika became independent from the United Kingdom (UK) on December 9, 1961. The United States (US) immediately recognized the new nation and moved to establish diplomatic relations. The US embassy in Dar es Salaam opened on the day of Tanganyika's independence. William R. Duggan served as the chargé d'affaires ad interim pending the appointment of an ambassador.

The Sultanate of Zanzibar became independent from the UK on December 19, 1963, as a constitutional monarchy headed by its sultan. The US established an embassy in Zanzibar on December 10, 1963, with Frederick P. Picard III serving as chargé d'affaires ad interim. In January 1964, the sultan was overthrown and the PRZ was established.

On April 26, 1964, Tanganyika united with the PRZ to form the United Republic of Tanganyika and Zanzibar (U.R.T.Z.). The US ambassador to Tanganyika, William K. Leonhart, immediately became the ambassador to the URTZ. A US ambassador to the PRZ had not yet been appointed when that country united with Tanganyika. In lieu of an ambassador, Frank C. Carlucci III was serving as the chargé d'affaires ad interim and continued in that capacity until the US embassy was downgraded to a consulate general on June 27, 1964.

The country was renamed the United Republic of Tanzania on October 29, 1964.

The United States did not have an ambassador to Tanzania from October 2016 to August 2020.

== Ambassadors ==
Name and status	Title	Appointed	Presented credentials	Terminated mission	Notes
William K. Leonhart – Career FSO	Ambassador Extraordinary and Plenipotentiary	August 22, 1962	October 3, 1962	December 22, 1965	Leonhart was originally commissioned to Tanganyika. He was recommissioned when Tanganyika became a republic and presented new credentials on December 17, 1962. Leonhart continued to serve without further reaccreditation after the formation of the United Republic of Tanganyika and Zanzibar
John H. Burns – Career FSO	Ambassador Extraordinary and Plenipotentiary	September 24, 1965	January 3, 1966	June 22, 1969	
Claude G. Ross – Career FSO	Ambassador Extraordinary and Plenipotentiary	October 9, 1969	December 27, 1969	June 25, 1972	
W. Beverly Carter, Jr. – Career FSO	Ambassador Extraordinary and Plenipotentiary	June 27, 1972	July 24, 1972	October 14, 1975	
James W. Spain – Career FSO	Ambassador Extraordinary and Plenipotentiary	November 20, 1975	January 8, 1976	August 21, 1979	
Richard Noyes Viets – Career FSO	Ambassador Extraordinary and Plenipotentiary	September 28, 1979	October 18, 1979	May 16, 1981	
David Charles Miller, Jr. – Political appointee	Ambassador Extraordinary and Plenipotentiary	October 26, 1981	November 4, 1981	February 28, 1984	
John William Shirley – Career FSO	Ambassador Extraordinary and Plenipotentiary	June 28, 1984	July 28, 1984	July 18, 1986	
Donald K. Petterson – Career FSO	Ambassador Extraordinary and Plenipotentiary	October 16, 1986	December 8, 1986	December 26, 1989	
Edmund DeJarnette, Jr. – Career FSO	Ambassador Extraordinary and Plenipotentiary	November 21, 1989	February 26, 1990	September 12, 1992	
Peter Jon de Vos – Career FSO	Ambassador Extraordinary and Plenipotentiary	June 15, 1992	January 8, 1993	June 3, 1994	
J. Brady Anderson – Political appointee	Ambassador Extraordinary and Plenipotentiary	August 26, 1994	September 13, 1994	October 7, 1997	
Charles Richard Stith – Political appointee	Ambassador Extraordinary and Plenipotentiary	June 29, 1998	September 17, 1998	January 20, 2001	
Robert V. Royall – Political appointee	Ambassador Extraordinary and Plenipotentiary	November 5, 2001	December 19, 2001	November 21, 2003	The post was vacant from November 2003 until August 2005. Michael S. Owen served as chargé d'affaires ad interim during that time.
Michael Retzer – Political appointee	Ambassador Extraordinary and Plenipotentiary	August 24, 2005	March 9, 2005	August 31, 2007	
Mark Andrew Green – Political appointee	Ambassador Extraordinary and Plenipotentiary	August 23, 2007	September 13, 2007	January 20, 2009	
Alfonso Lenhardt – Political appointee	Ambassador Extraordinary and Plenipotentiary	November 12, 2009	November 12, 2009	October 9, 2013	
Mark B. Childress – Political appointee	Ambassador Extraordinary and Plenipotentiary	April 7, 2014	May 22, 2014	October 25, 2016	
Donald J. Wright – Political appointee	Ambassador Extraordinary and Plenipotentiary	February 14, 2020	August 2, 2020	January 11, 2023	
Michael Battle - Political appointee	Ambassador Extraordinary and Plenipotentiary	December 13, 2022	February 27, 2023	January 15, 2025	
Andrew Lentz - Career FSO	Chargé d'affaires ad interim	January 15, 2025		October 15, 2026	
William Trachman - Political appointee	Ambassador Extraordinary and Plenipotentiary	August 7, 2026	October 15, 2026	Present	

== See also ==
- Tanzania–United States relations
- Foreign relations of Tanzania
- Ambassadors of the United States
