= MaryAnn Tierney =

American government official

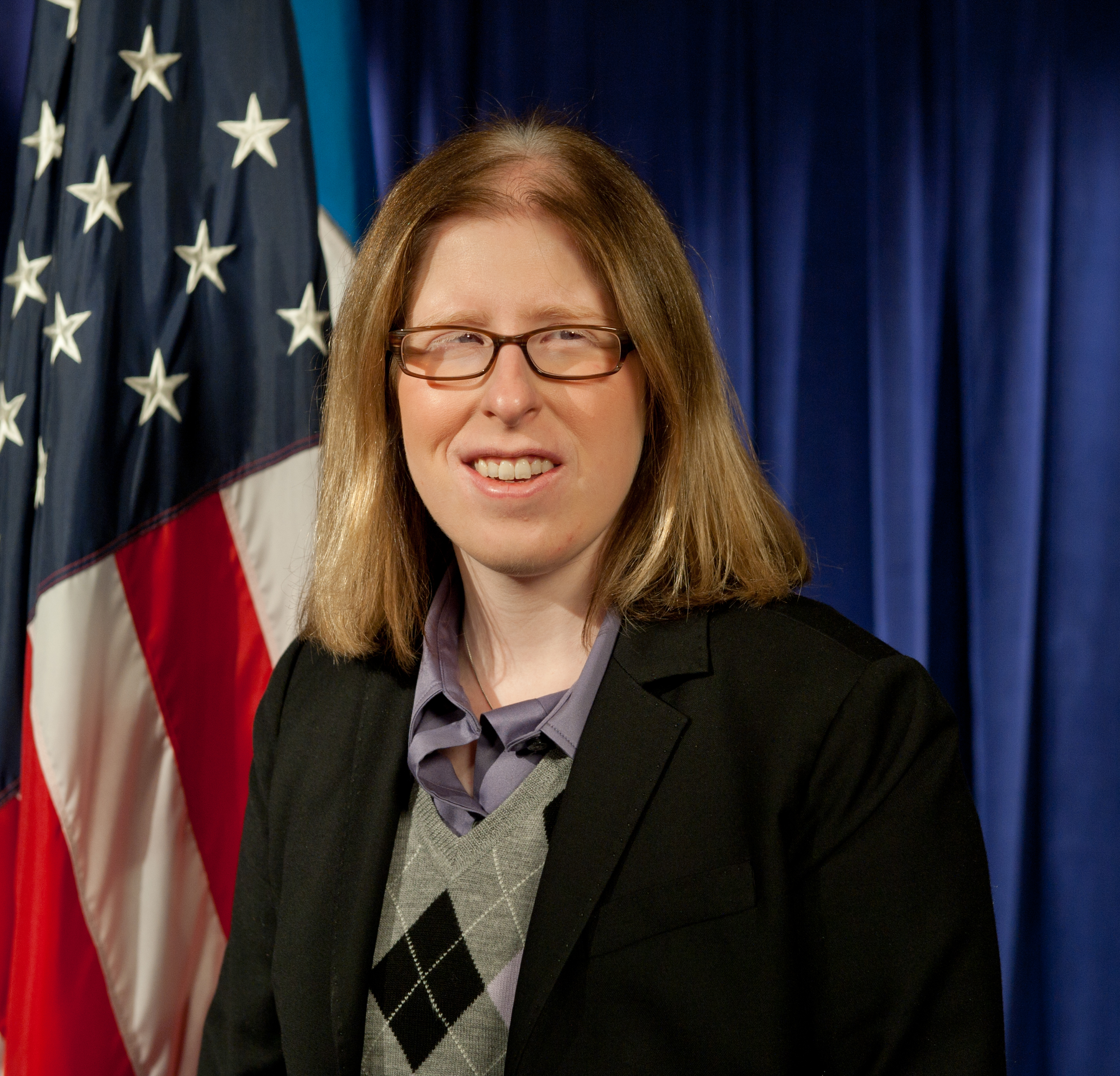
- Official portrait, 2025

Acting United States Deputy Secretary of Homeland Security
- In office January 20, 2025 – January 28, 2025
- President: Donald Trump
- Preceded by: Kristie Canegallo (acting)
- Succeeded by: Benjamine Huffman (acting)

Personal details
- Education: American University (BA), New York University (MA)

MaryAnn Tierney is an American public servant, emergency management professional, and former Federal Emergency Management Agency (FEMA) official.

== Education ==
Tierney attended American University and earned her master's degree from New York University.

== Career ==
Tierney spent 15 years at FEMA. In 2010, Tierney was named the FEMA Regional Administrator for Region III, which includes Delaware, Maryland, Pennsylvania, Virginia, West Virginia, and Washington, DC.

Tierney also served as the Senior Coordinating Official for the Southwest Border Coordination Center in 2022.

Tierney left FEMA in May 2025 in a major leadership shake-up that included more than a dozen senior executives. Since leaving the agency, Tierney has spoken out about mismanagement and under-resourcing under the Trump administration.

Tierney currently works with the Southeastern Pennsylvania Transportation Authority (SEPTA), overseeing control center operations, and played an instrumental role in ensuring organizational preparedness during the 2026 FIFA World Cup.

== Publications ==
- Texas Hill Country Is Underwater, and America’s Emergency Lifeline Is Fraying (The New York Times, July 7, 2025)
