= Robert V. Royall =

American diplomat

Robert V. Royall (born 1934) was a Republican businessman and banker and the United States Ambassador to Tanzania from 21 July 2001 to 3 November 2003. Prior to this he had served as the South Carolina Secretary of Commerce from 13 January 1995 to 6 January 1999.

Royall has a bachelor's degree from the University of South Carolina.

== Sources ==
- listing of past ambassadors
- bio of Royall
- announcement of Royall's appointment as Ambassador

Diplomatic posts
Preceded by Charles Richard Stith	United States Ambassador to Tanzania; 2001–2003	Succeeded by Michael Retzer
