= Bruce Laingen =

American diplomat (1922–2019)

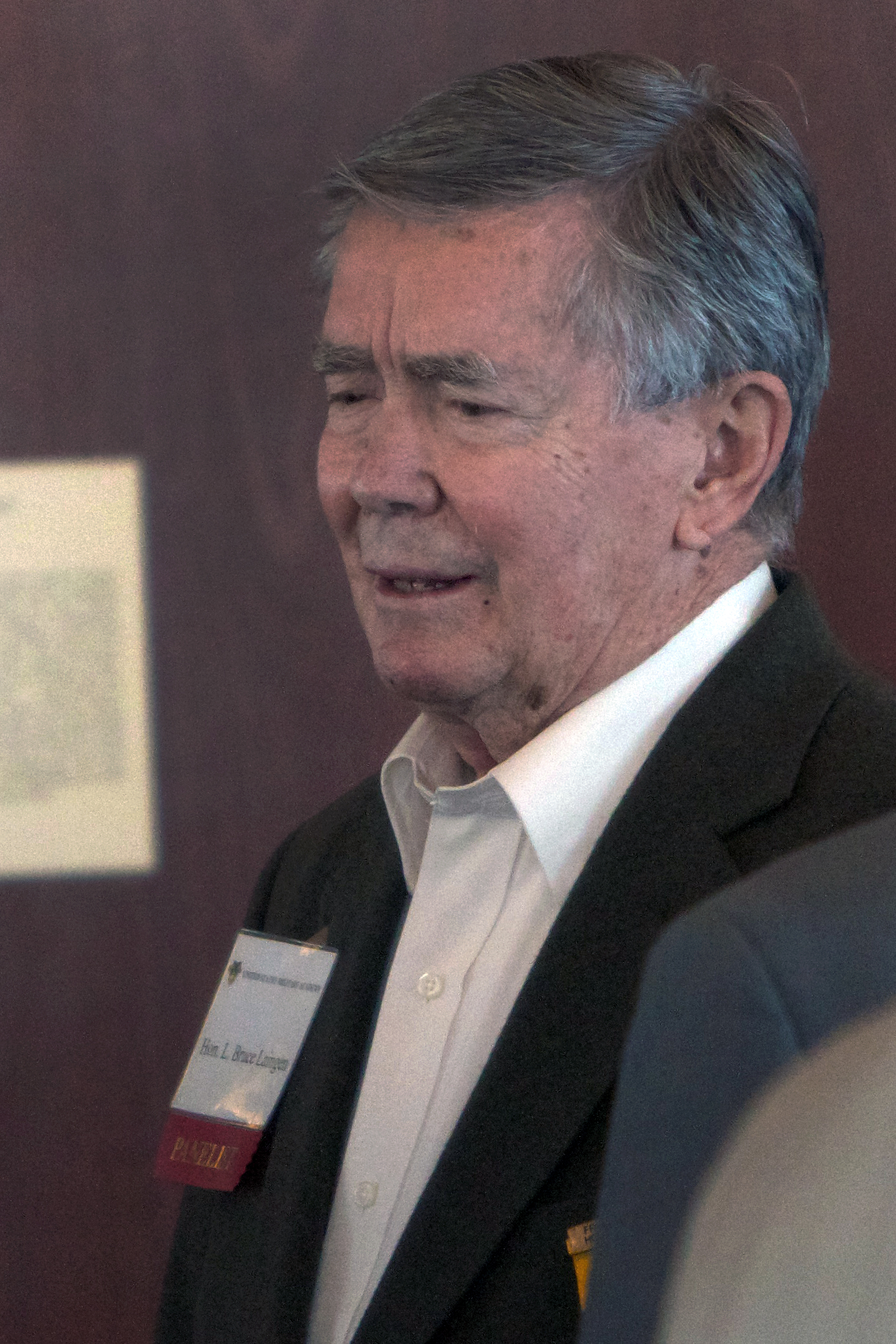
- Laingen in 2011

United States Chargé d'Affaires to Iran
- In office June 16, 1979 – April 7, 1980
- Nominated by: Jimmy Carter
- Preceded by: William H. Sullivan (as ambassador)
- Succeeded by: Diplomatic relations severed

United States Ambassador to Malta
- In office January 11, 1977 – January 20, 1979
- Nominated by: Gerald Ford
- Preceded by: Robert P. Smith
- Succeeded by: Joan M. Clark

Personal details
- Born: Lowell Bruce Laingen; August 6, 1922 Butterfield, Minnesota, U.S.
- Died: July 15, 2019 (aged 96) Bethesda, Maryland, U.S.
- Spouse: Penelope Babcock (m. 1957)
- Education: St. Olaf College (BA); University of Minnesota (MA)

Military service
- Allegiance: United States of America
- Branch/service: United States Navy
- Years of service: 1943–1946
- Battles/wars: World War II

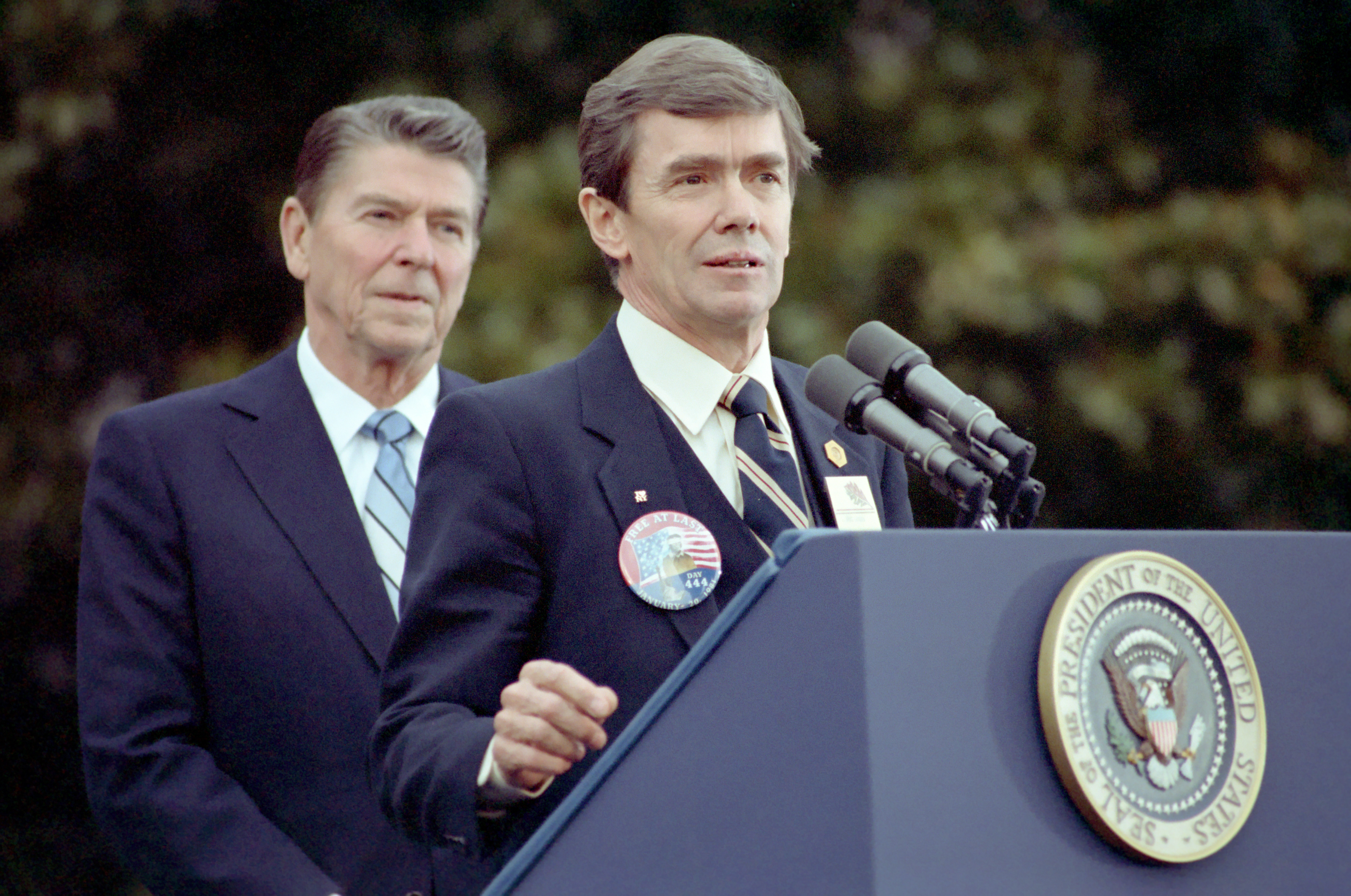
Laingen speaking at the White House on January 27, 1981, with President Ronald Reagan

Lowell Bruce Laingen (August 6, 1922 – July 15, 2019) was an American diplomat who served as the United States Ambassador to Malta from 1977 to 1979. Laingen is best known for having been the most senior American official held hostage during the Iran hostage crisis, while serving as the chargé d'affaires (head of diplomatic mission) at the U.S. Embassy in Tehran.

== Early life, naval service, and education ==
Laingen was born on a farm near Butterfield and Odin in Watonwan County, Minnesota. During World War II, Laingen served in the U.S. Navy in the South Pacific as a lieutenant. After the war he graduated from St. Olaf College and obtained an M.A. in International Relations from the University of Minnesota. He also studied at the National War College in 1968.

== Diplomatic career ==
In 1949 Laingen joined the U.S. Foreign Service. He served at posts in Germany, Iran, Pakistan, and Afghanistan, and was then appointed Ambassador to Malta by President Gerald Ford in 1977.

Laingen was then sent back to Iran as the U.S. chargé d'affaires in June 1979, after ambassador William H. Sullivan and chargé d'affaires Charlie Naas were relieved of their posts by President Jimmy Carter. Laingen had previously served in Iran during the 1950s.

On November 4, 1979, the U.S. embassy was overrun by student protesters following the Iranian Revolution. 63 hostages were taken at the embassy, while Laingen and two others were seized at the Iranian Foreign Ministry Office. His wife, Penelope Lippitt Babcock, tied a yellow ribbon about the oak at their home during the crisis. Laingen and 51 hostages were released on January 20, 1981, following 444 days of captivity. Laingen remains the last American head of mission to Iran, as direct bilateral diplomatic relations between the two governments were severed following the seizure of the embassy and have not been restored since.

After they were released from Iran in January 1981, Laingen and the other hostages arrived in the United States at the United States Military Academy, West Point, New York. Four months later, on May 26, the West Point Class of 1981 honored him as their graduation banquet speaker during a formal dining event in the Cadet Mess Hall. Laingen was awarded the State Department's Award for Valor along with several other recognitions.

Laingen's next position was that of Vice President of the National Defense University, a post traditionally held by a senior diplomat. He retired from the Foreign Service in 1987 after 38 years of service. Laingen previously served as the President of the American Academy of Diplomacy.

== Later life and death ==
In 2010 Laingen was presented the Lifetime Contributions to American Diplomacy Award by the American Foreign Service Association.

Laingen died on July 15, 2019, at an assisted living facility in Bethesda, Maryland, at the age of 96 from complications of Parkinson's disease.

== Personal life ==
In 1957, he married Penelope Lippitt Babcock, a then-FBI researcher who met him on a blind date. They would have three children who would all become U.S. Navy officers.

She would later, in December 1979, tie a yellow ribbon around a tree on the lawn of her Maryland home, with the ribbon primarily symbolizing the resolve of the American people to win the safe release of the hostages in Iran. Yellow ribbons would be featured prominently in the celebrations of hostages return home in January 1981. The house he and Penelope lived in was sold in 2013, and the lot was razed, with the stipulation by him and Penelope that the oak tree, with the yellow ribbon around it, had to stay on the property.

Diplomatic posts
Preceded by Robert P. Smith	United States Ambassador to Malta; January 11, 1977 – January 20, 1979	Succeeded by Joan M. Clark
Preceded by William H. Sullivan as ambassador	United States Chargé d'Affaires to Iran; June 16, 1979 – April 7, 1980	Diplomatic relations severed
