= William H. Sullivan =

American diplomat (1922–2013)

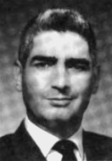
- Sullivan in 1964

United States Ambassador to Iran
- In office June 18, 1977 – April 6, 1979
- President: Jimmy Carter
- Preceded by: Richard Helms
- Succeeded by: Bruce Laingen (chargé d'affaires)

United States Ambassador to the Philippines
- In office August 6, 1973 – April 26, 1977
- President: Richard Nixon; Gerald Ford; Jimmy Carter
- Preceded by: Henry A. Byroade
- Succeeded by: David D. Newsom

United States Ambassador to Laos
- In office December 23, 1964 – March 18, 1969
- President: Lyndon B. Johnson; Richard Nixon
- Preceded by: Leonard S. Unger
- Succeeded by: G. McMurtrie Godley

Personal details
- Born: William Healy Sullivan; October 12, 1922 Cranston, Rhode Island, U.S.
- Died: October 11, 2013 (aged 90) Washington, D. C., U.S.
- Education: Brown University

Military service
- Allegiance: United States
- Branch/service: United States Navy
- Battles/wars: World War II

William Healy Sullivan (October 12, 1922 – October 11, 2013) was an American Foreign Service career officer who served as ambassador to Laos from 1964 to 1969, the Philippines from 1973 to 1977, and Iran from 1977 to 1979.

== Early life and career ==
Sullivan was born in Cranston, Rhode Island, and graduated from Brown University as salutatorian and Class Orator of the class of 1943. His senior address was on America's duty to "aid in repairing not only the damage suffered by our Allies, but also that sustained by our enemies." After graduation, he entered the Navy and served as a gunnery officer on a destroyer, the USS Hambleton. The Hambleton escorted North Atlantic convoys, and served off North Africa and Italy before participating in the D-Day invasion of Normandy and the invasion of Okinawa. He had the senior watch on the Hambleton when it entered Yokohama harbor for the Japanese surrender.

After obtaining a joint graduate degree from Harvard University and the Fletcher School at Tufts University under the GI Bill, Sullivan joined the Foreign Service and was posted to Bangkok, Thailand. His subsequent assignments were to Calcutta, India, Tokyo, Japan, Naples and Rome, Italy, and The Hague, the Netherlands.

His habit of speaking his mind with force and candor grated on more than one superior, and for years he languished in the lower grades. Then, in the Kennedy administration, he was assigned to the office of W. Averell Harriman, the Assistant Secretary for the Far East. Harriman, no admirer of blandness, immediately recognized his abilities.

Sullivan served as Harriman's deputy at Geneva negotiations about the future of Laos in 1961 and during the Cuban Missile Crisis. When the Vietnam War heated up, he served briefly as deputy chief of mission to the U.S. Embassy in Saigon.

His nephew is former United States Deputy Secretary of State and former United States Ambassador to Russia John Sullivan.

== Ambassador to Laos ==
In 1964, Sullivan began his tenure as Ambassador to Laos. Pursuant to an order by President John F. Kennedy, all U.S. military operations in Laos were under the direct supervision of the Ambassador. As Ambassador to Laos during Project 404, and he also personally directed the bombing of the Ho Chi Minh trail. This civilian control and the restriction on military operations rankled the military.

He was also involved in Lima Site 85 in Laos: "Throughout January and February, intelligence collected by the Hmongs confirmed that a major assault on Lima Site 85 was being prepared, but Sullivan and the US military took no steps to strengthen the defenses....Major Richard Secord, who was responsible for the security of Lima Site 85, was concerned about the safety of the unarmed U.S. Air Force technicians working there dressed as civilians. He requested Green Berets be assigned as on-site security. Sullivan turned down the request, repeatedly insisting the "civilian personnel" at Lima Site 85 should not be armed, but Secord decided to equip the technicians with weapons. M16 rifles, fragmentation grenades, concussion grenades, and other small arms were then brought in. Secord said that given the site's meager defenses, he felt the site could not be held against a serious assault. Secord's fears were justified, as USAF reconnaissance aircraft regularly flying over northeastern Laos in 1967 revealed that the paved roads constructed by the North Vietnamese were obviously approaching Phou Pha Thi. Road construction activities were observed along Routes 6 and 19, which connected Dien Bien Phu in North Vietnam with Phou Pha Thi and Nam Bac in Laos. Realizing the People's Army of Vietnam (PAVN) would try to destroy the installation, Secord advised the U.S. Embassy in Vientiane to evacuate all U.S. personnel. However, high-ranking U.S. officials insisted that Lima Site 85 should operate as long as possible, as it helped save the lives of U.S. pilots every day it remained operational. "..By 9 March 1968, the US facility atop Phou Pha Thi was surrounded by PAVN and Pathet Lao units. The PAVN 766th Regiment and one Pathet Lao battalion totalled more than 3,000 men. Despite the gravity of the situation, Sullivan did not issue an order for the evacuation of US personnel from Phou Pha Thi..." A total of 13 USAF personnel were killed/died of wounds in addition to 42 Thai and Hmong killed + few dozen Hmong wounded; North Vietnamese losses were 1 killed and 2 wounded. "..A large number of weapons were captured by the PAVN, including one 105 mm howitzer, one 85 mm artillery piece, four recoilless rifles, four heavy mortars, nine heavy machine guns, and vast amounts of ammunition. The PAVN victory proved to be a significant one, as they had succeeded in knocking out a major asset of the USAF, which had inflicted heavy damage to North Vietnam's limited industrial infrastructure.

After he left Laos, Sullivan returned to Washington to coordinate the U.S. participation in the Paris Peace Talks. Thereafter, he was appointed Ambassador to the Philippines. South Vietnam fell while he was in the Philippines, and Sullivan orchestrated the evacuation of hundreds of thousands of people through that nation. He was able to convince President Marcos to permit the fleeing South Vietnamese navy to land, despite a demand from the new Communist Vietnamese government for its return, by arguing that the ships were in fact U.S. property after the fall of the South Vietnamese government, as a result of the terms of their sale to that state.

== Ambassador to Iran ==
Sullivan next served as Ambassador to Iran, arriving just before President Jimmy Carter's visit to the Iran in December 1977. In the 1970s, America had extremely close military and economic links with Iran.

As demonstrations increased in scale, Sullivan came into conflict with National Security Advisor Zbigniew Brzezinski over a resolution that would be acceptable to American interests. Sullivan felt that compromise with the demonstrators and the Ayatollah Khomeini was necessary, while Brzezinski favored strong, unconditional support for the Shah of Iran and Iranian Prime Minister Shapour Bakhtiar. Although Brzezinski got his way, the demonstrators prevailed. On November 9, 1978, Sullivan cabled Washington that it might be necessary to consider policy options if the military proved unable to assure the shah's continuance in power and the shah should depart from Iran. This telegram, titled Thinking the Unthinkable, highlighted a major shift in support of the shah's position in Iran. Previous information had suggested that the shah would be able to make it through the demonstrations and last at least another decade. In the telegram, Sullivan comments on how total support for the shah has become increasingly unlikely and that options not considered relevant to the Carter administration may have to be taken in order to preserve the United States' interests in the region. The telegram would make its way to Jimmy Carter, who in response concluded that Sullivan may not be capable of saving the shah's regime and considered firing him. In January 1979, the White House instructed Sullivan to inform the shah that the U.S. government felt he should leave the country.

On February 1, 1979, the exiled Khomeini returned to Tehran. Days later, with Tehran in revolution and all organs of state essentially nonexistent, Under Secretary of State David D. Newsom called from the White House Situation Room with a question for Sullivan: "The National Security Advisor (Brzezinski) has asked for your view of the possibility of a coup d'état by the Iranian military to take over from the Bakhtiar government, which is clearly faltering."

Sullivan allegedly replied, "Tell Brzezinski to fuck off."

"That's not a very helpful comment," Newsom noted.

"You want it translated into Polish?" Sullivan hung up.

On February 14, 1979, the U.S. Embassy in Teheran was overrun by several different armed groups. The Embassy staff was briefly taken hostage, but later released to the caretaker Iranian government. This crisis, which predated the larger Iran Hostage Crisis by nine months, became sarcastically known as the "St. Valentine's Day Open House" owing to the date on which it occurred.

Sullivan wrote in his autobiography: "I had recommended that we accept the fact that a revolution was in progress and seek to use our not inconsiderable influence to steer its success toward its more moderate protagonists." This view, however, was not shared by Washington, and Sullivan was recalled in March 1979. Shortly after, on April 1, 1979, Iran officially became an Islamic Republic. Sullivan realized the Shah was doomed and proposed a deal between the Iranian military and Ayatollah Khomeini to prevent a total radical takeover, mistakenly believing a stable transitional government could be formed. Misreading Khomeini's Intentions: Sullivan famously compared Khomeini to a "Gandhi-like figure," viewing him as a religious figurehead who might return to a quietist role in Qom rather than seeking absolute political power.

After Sullivan left Iran, the Embassy drew down to a skeleton staff, under the direction of Chargé d'Affaires Bruce Laingen, who later became one of 52 Americans held hostage by militant Iranian students.

He headed the American Assembly at Columbia University, which had been briefly headed by General Dwight Eisenhower before he was elected President, from 1979 to 1986. In 1981, Sullivan published Mission to Iran, a memoir of his time as ambassador. His autobiography, Obbligato: Notes on a Foreign Service Career, was published in 1984.

=== Systemic Intelligence Gaps ===
Sullivan inherited an embassy with few Farsi speakers and limited contact with religious or opposition circles, as U.S. policy had strictly forbidden contact with the Shah’s opponents for years. This left him reliant on a "failed imagination" that did not foresee a revolution led by religious reactionaries.

=== Reliance on Moderate Fronts ===
Sullivan placed hope in figures like Mehdi Bazargan, a moderate appointed as interim Prime Minister. He failed to recognize that these moderates held little actual power compared to the radicalized working class and Khomeini's inner circle.

== Later career ==
He later served on the boards of the Lincoln Center, the International Center, and the U.S.–Vietnam Trade Council. He also headed the American Assembly at Columbia University, which had been briefly headed by General Dwight Eisenhower before he was elected President, from 1979 to 1986. In 1981, Sullivan published Mission to Iran, a memoir of his time as ambassador. His autobiography, Obbligato: Notes on a Foreign Service Career, was published in 1984.

In 1988 he received an overture to begin steps towards U.S.–Vietnam normalization from his former North Vietnamese negotiations counterpart Nguyen Co Thach, who had become Vietnam's Deputy Prime Minister and Foreign Minister. Sullivan first traveled back to Vietnam in May 1989 to meet with Minister Thach, founded the U.S.–Vietnam Trade Council, and from then continued to work on steps towards the normalization.

Following retirement, he lived a quiet life in Cuernavaca, Mexico, and later, Washington, D.C.

Sullivan died on October 11, 2013, one day before his 91st birthday. He is survived by four children and six grandchildren.

Diplomatic posts
Preceded by Leonard S. Unger	United States Ambassador to Laos; 1964–1969	Succeeded by G. McMurtrie Godley
Preceded by Henry A. Byroade	United States Ambassador to the Philippines; 1973–1977	Succeeded by David D. Newsom
Preceded by Richard Helms	United States Ambassador to Iran; 1977–1979	Succeeded by Bruce Laingen (chargé d'affaires)
