= James W. Spain =

American diplomat

James William Spain (July 22, 1926 – January 2, 2008) was an American diplomat in the US Foreign Service with postings in Karachi, Islamabad, Istanbul, Ankara, Dar Es Salaam, and Colombo and four ambassadorships: in Tanzania, Turkey, the United Nations (as deputy permanent representative), and Sri Lanka.

== Biography ==
James W. Spain was born in Chicago, Illinois in 1926. His parents were Irish immigrants; his father was a streetcar conductor, and his mother was a seamstress. Spain attended St. Brendan's Parochial School and Archbishop Quigley Preparatory Seminary before receiving a master's degree from the University of Chicago and a PhD from Columbia University. He was married and had four children, including Patrick Spain, founder of Hoover's and HighBeam Research.

During World War II, Spain served on General Douglas MacArthur's staff as a photographer in occupied Japan. He began his career with the Foreign Service in 1951, with his first posting as Vice Consul in Karachi. Spain's government service career spanned several decades, and he was involved with the transition to majority rule in Zimbabwe.

After his initial post in Karachi, Spain returned to the United States, living primarily in Washington, D.C. until 1969. He held several positions, including:

- Chargé d'Affaires to Pakistan (1969)
- Consul General in Istanbul (1970–1972)
- Deputy Chief of Mission in Ankara (1972–1974)
- Ambassador to Tanzania (1975–1979)
- Deputy Ambassador to the United Nations under Andrew Young (1979)
- Ambassador to Turkey (1980–1981)
- Ambassador to Sri Lanka (1985–1989)
- Ambassador to Maldives (1985-1989

Spain retired as a Career Minister in the Foreign Service and remained in Sri Lanka until 2006, when he returned to the United States and settled in Wilmington. In retirement, Spain was involved in organizing a power and irrigation project in Sri Lanka. He died of natural causes on January 2, 2008, in Wilmington, North Carolina, at the age of 81.

== Publications ==
Spain authored several books. In Those Days: A Diplomat Remembers is his autobiography, a memoir of his time as an American diplomat in Asia and Africa engaged in high-level diplomacy. He also authored The Pathan Borderland, People of the Khyber, Pathans of the Latter Day, American Diplomacy in Turkey, and The Way of the Pathans.

Diplomatic posts
Preceded by W. Beverly Carter, Jr.	U.S. Ambassador to Tanzania; 1976–1979	Succeeded by Richard Noyes Viets
Preceded by Ronald I. Spiers	U.S. Ambassador to Turkey; 1980–1981	Succeeded by Robert Strausz-Hupé
Preceded by John Hathaway Reed	U.S. Ambassador to Sri Lanka; 1985–1988	Succeeded by Marion V. Creekmore, Jr.
