= Michael Retzer =

American politician diplomat

Michael Lynn Retzer, Sr.
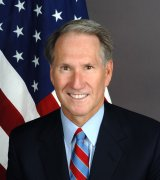

US Ambassador to Tanzania
- In office March 9, 2005 – August 31, 2007
- Preceded by: Robert V. Royall
- Succeeded by: Mark Andrew Green

Chair of the Mississippi Republican Party

Personal details
- Born: 1946 (age 79–80) Bethesda, Maryland, U.S.
- Party: Republican
- Children: 2
- Occupation: Businessman

Michael Lynn Retzer, Sr. (born 1946) is an American Republican politician from Mississippi who was United States Ambassador to Tanzania from 2005 to 2007.

== Background ==
Retzer was born in Bethesda, Maryland, to Karl and Betty Retzer; he has two brothers, Bill Retzer and Jere Retzer. He graduated in 1968 with a bachelor's degree in finance and marketing from the University of Oregon's Honors College in Eugene, Oregon. He then followed his father's lead and joined the United States Air Force.

Retzer served as a captain in the U.S. Air Force, in which he was decorated with the Meritorious Service Award and Commendation medal. He formally served on the board of directors and the executive committee of the Planters Bank of Mississippi.

== Political life ==
Since 1978, when he succeeded Charles W. Pickering, Retzer has been elected multiple times as state chairman of the Mississippi Republican Party. In 2004, he was elected Treasurer of the Republican National Convention, which met in New York City to re-nominate the Bush-Cheney ticket. In 2001, he was elected Republican National Committeeman for Mississippi; Jim Herring, a lawyer from Canton, then became chairman for a seven-year stint. In 2002, Retzer was named treasurer of the national Republican Party.

== US Ambassador to Tanzania ==
Retzer was named as Ambassador to Tanzania by U.S. President George W. Bush on June 28, 2005, and the Senate confirmed him on July 29, 2005. Retzer was sworn in by Secretary of State Condoleezza Rice as United States Ambassador to the United Republic of Tanzania on August 24, 2005, and presented his credentials to President Benjamin Mkapa in Dar es Salaam on September 1, 2005.

While in Tanzania, Retzer was an important part of the program to end corruption in its government. The agreement between the United States and Tanzania gave the country the ability to improve the way civil society monitors the government's progress in getting rid of corruption. It also strengthened the rule of law so corruption cases could finally be tried in court, established a financial intelligence unit to help discover any financial crimes within the government and increase transparency across the board.

=== Dispute with Peace Corps ===
In February 2007, Retzer informed the White House personnel of his intention to return home September 1, 2007. On June 8, 2007, the White House announced that Retzer would be replaced as Ambassador to Tanzania by Mark Green, a former Republican congressman and unsuccessful gubernatorial candidate in Wisconsin. On June 14, 2007, the Peace Corps announced its strong disagreement with the decision of Retzer to withdraw the authorization for Peace Corps Country Director Christine Djondo to remain in Tanzania and the adverse effects of Retzer's decision on the Peace Corps program in Tanzania. As a result, the Peace Corp minimized the incoming group of volunteers by half to ensure adequate support. On June 27 Senator Chris Dodd of Connecticut put a hold on the nomination of Mark Green to replace Retzer as Ambassador citing Retzer's action as interference in the independence of the Peace Corps. Dodd asked that Retzer rescind his cable of no confidence of Djondo or that the State Department provide a written apology to her. On June 28, after he announced that he had received an apology from the State Department Senator Dodd released his hold on Green's nomination allowing it to go forward.

== Civic organizations ==
In Greenville, Mississippi, where he has resided, Retzer has contributed to community growth by serving in many civic organizations, such as the Chamber of Commerce, the Industrial Foundation, and the South Delta Planning Council and Rotary Club. He was also a founding member of Delta Wildlife Foundation and the Mississippi Wildlife Foundation. He has also served as a trustee of the National Symphony Orchestra in Washington, D.C.

== Retzer Resources, Inc. ==
Outside of his political career, Retzer is the head of Retzer Resources, Inc. He founded the company in 1973. In partnership with his son Michael, they are the largest McDonald's franchisee owner in the United States. They currently operate 104 restaurants located in five states. One of his McDonald's franchises in Pine Bluff, Arkansas features the only remaining single-arch sign in Arkansas. It was approved and accepted by the United States National Register of Historic Places in 2007.

== Personal life ==
Retzer has one son, Michael Retzer Jr. and one daughter, Kathryn Retzer He regularly supports the Republican party with political donations to multiple campaigns, both on a local and national level.

Diplomatic posts
Preceded by Robert V. Royall	Ambassador to Tanzania; 2005-2007	Succeeded by Mark Green
