= Jeffrey Lewis (disambiguation) =

Jeffrey Lewis (born 1975) is an American singer-songwriter.

Jeffrey or Jeff Lewis may also refer to:

- Jeffrey Lewis (composer) (born 1942), Welsh composer
- Jeff Lewis (real estate speculator) (born 1970), American real estate speculator and star of reality television series Flipping Out
- Jeff Lewis (American football) (1973–2013), American football player
- Jeff Lewis (golfer) (1953–), American golfer
- Jeffrey Lewis (writer), American screenwriter associated with Hill Street Blues
- Jeff Lewis, Republican member of the U.S. state Georgia House of Representatives since 1993
- Jeffrey Lewis (academic), American nuclear proliferation academic and researcher
- Jeff Lewis (professor), Australian professor at Royal Melbourne Institute of Technology

== See also ==
- Geoffrey Lewis (disambiguation)
- Jeffreys Lewis (ca. 1852–1926), British-born American actress
- Jeff Louis (born 1992), Haitian international footballer
