= Embassy of the United States, Dar es Salaam =

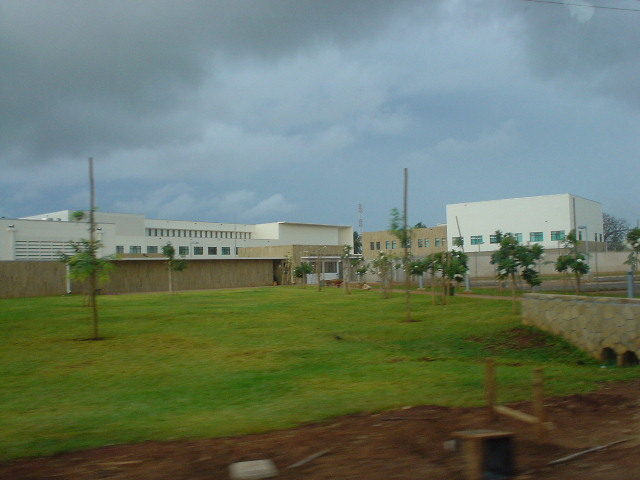
- Location: Msasani, Dar es Salaam, Tanzania
- Address: 686 Old Bagamoyo Road
- Coordinates: 6°46′23″S 39°15′58″E
- Ambassador: Andrew Lentz, Chargé d'Affaires a.i
- Website: tz.usembassy.gov/embassy/

The Embassy of the United States of America in Dar es Salaam (Swahili: Ubalozi wa Marekani) is the diplomatic mission of the United States in Tanzania.

== History ==
Diplomatic relations between the United States and Tanzania, initially known as Tanganyika, began shortly after the country gained independence from British rule in 1961. The United States recognized Tanganyika on December 9, 1961, with a congratulatory message from President John F. Kennedy to Prime Minister Julius Nyerere. The American consulate general in Dar es Salaam was elevated to an Embassy on December 9, 1961, with William R. Duggan serving as the Chargé d'Affaires ad interim. The US Embassy helps aid local schools and programs within the country. Like the International School of Tanganyika and the Jane Goodall Institute.

On August 7, 1998, the embassy, at its former address of 36 Laibon Road, along with the U.S. Embassy in Nairobi, was the target of a bomb attack perpetrated by al-Qaeda. The bomb attack in Dar es Salaam killed 11 people.

The new embassy compound was opened on March 4, 2003, in Dar es Salaam. The embassy is a 22-acre compound that houses two main structures; the Chancery and the USAID Building. The embassy also includes a playground, pool and tennis and basketball courts.

== See also ==
- Embassy of Tanzania, Washington, D.C.
- List of ambassadors of the United States to Tanzania
- Tanzania–United States relations
