= Tanzania–United States relations =

- Tanzania: United States

Diplomatic mission
- Tanzanian Embassy, Washington, D.C.: United States Embassy, Dar es Salaam

Tanzania–United States relations are bilateral relations between Tanzania and the United States.

== History ==
Much of the relationship between Tanzania and the United States has been framed first by the Cold War, and more recently in the context of US policies toward Africa and development. At times relations between the two countries have been tense, though in recent years the two countries have established a growing partnership.

Much early tension in the relationship is rooted in Tanzania's interests in promoting anti-colonial liberation forces in southern Africa, and the United States interests in protecting markets and business interests in Africa. These interests were often in conflict between 1961, and the late 1980s. Since the late 1980s, relations between the United States and Tanzania have improved as a result of mutual interests in debt relief, successive refugee crises, the liberation of southern African countries, and an improving Tanzanian economy (see Waters 2006).

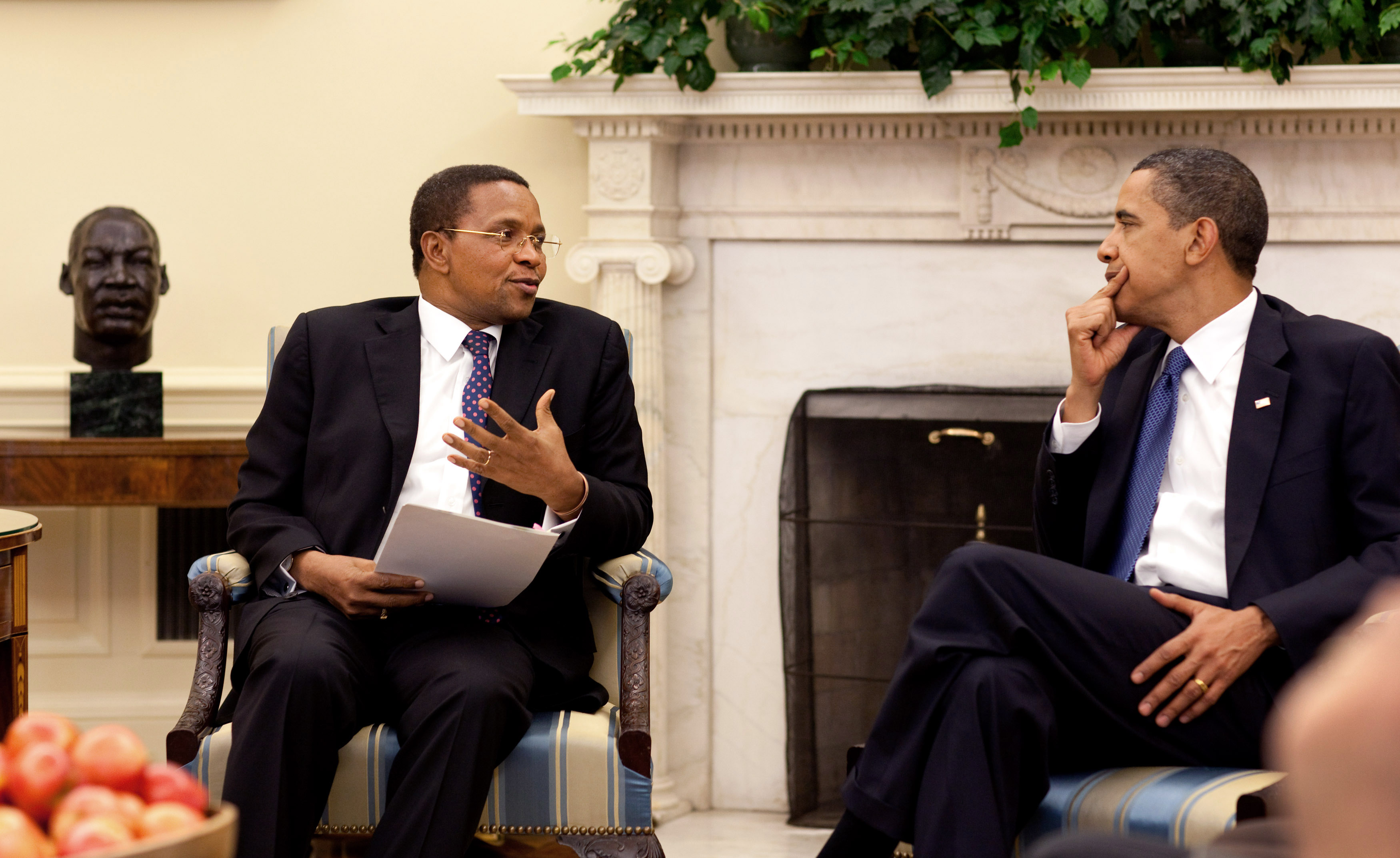
US President Barack Obama meeting his Tanzanian counterpart Jakaya Kikwete in the Oval office in May 2009.

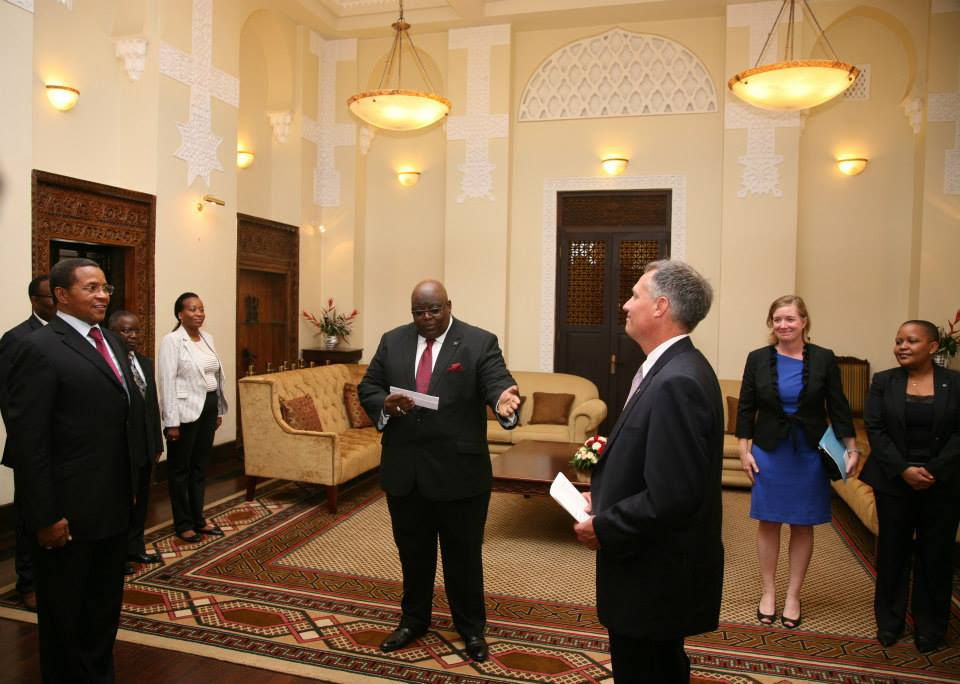
Ambassador Mark B. Childress presenting his credentials to President Kikwete.

Terrorists associated with Al Qaeda bombed the U.S. Embassies in Dar es Salaam and Nairobi, Kenya, on August 7, 1998. This act horrified Tanzanians and Americans alike and also drew condemnation from around the world. In the aftermath of the bombing, Tanzania began to receive financial aide from the US for anti-terrorist efforts and police training. President Benjamin Mkapa visited the U.S. in September 1999 with a delegation of business executives, reflecting the increased level of cooperation on trade and investment issues and Tanzania's commitment to economic liberalization. President Jakaya Kikwete, who was elected in 2005, visited the U.S. in May 2006, meeting with Secretary of State Rice, Vice President Dick Cheney, and, briefly, President George W. Bush. He met President Bush in a private meeting in September 2006 In New York. Kikwete sought to broaden Tanzanian ties to the U.S. across all spheres, including political, economic, and military.

In 2025, Tanzania sought the extradition of U.S.-based Tanzanian influencer and opposition activist Mange Kimambi.

== Aid ==
The U.S. Government provided assistance to Tanzania to support programs in the areas of health, environment, democracy, and development of the private sector. The U.S. Agency for International Development's program in Tanzania averaged about $20 million per year, a relatively small amount (see Waters 2006). The Peace Corps program, which discontinued in Tanzania due to objections to the United States involvement in the Vietnam War in the 1960s, was re-established in 1979, and provides assistance in education through the provision of teachers. Peace Corps also is assisting in health and environment sectors. First Lady Laura Bush visited Dar es Salaam and Zanzibar in mid-July 2005.

In 2025, Tanzanian community health workers, educators, and counselors funded by the U.S. President’s Emergency Plan for AIDS Relief lost their jobs as a result of President Donald Trump's administration stopping USAID funding, impacting healthcare services and support systems in the country.

== Resident diplomatic missions ==
- Tanzania has an embassy in Washington, D.C.
- United States has an embassy in Dar es Salaam.
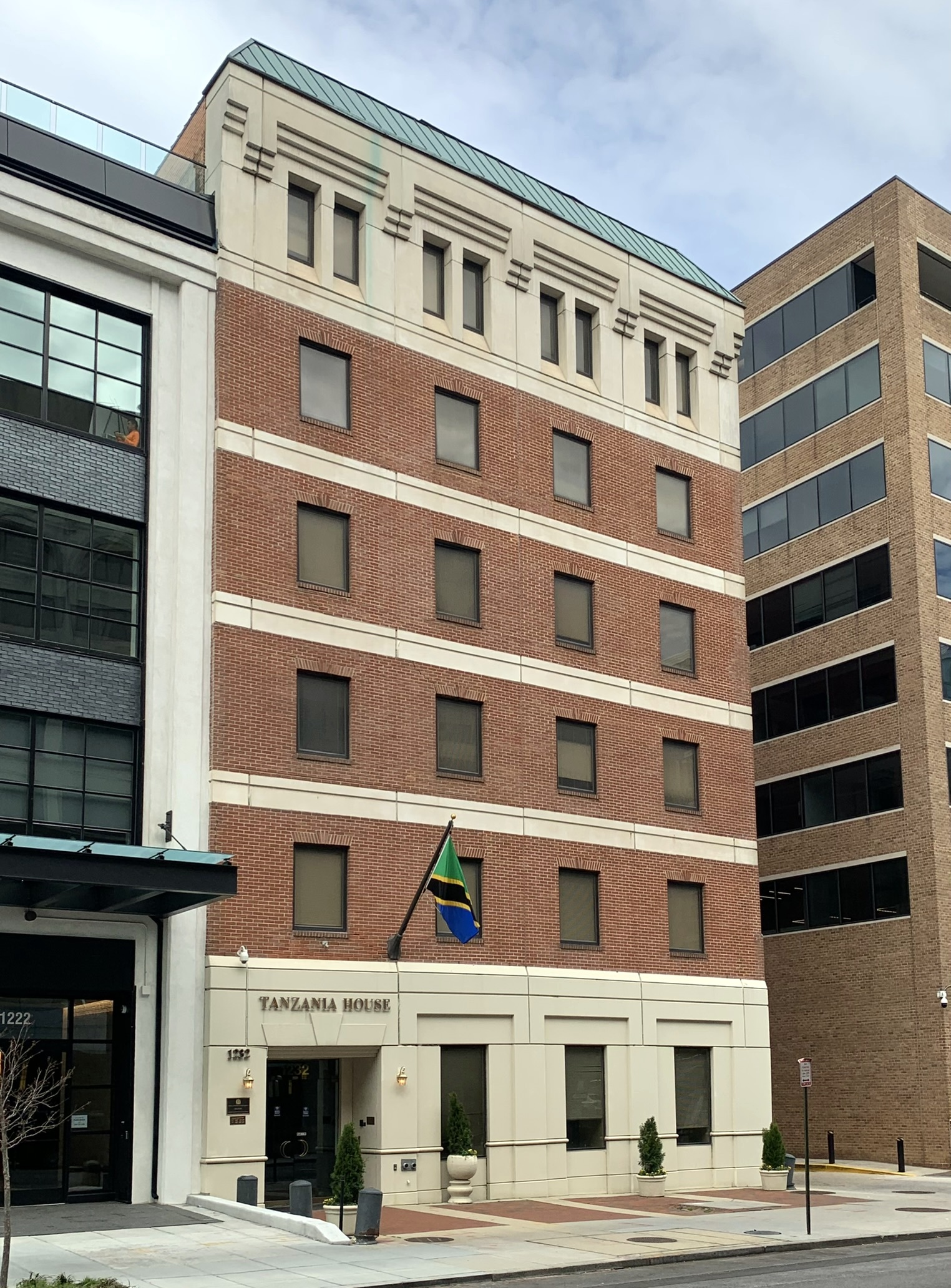
Embassy of Tanzania in Washington, D.C.

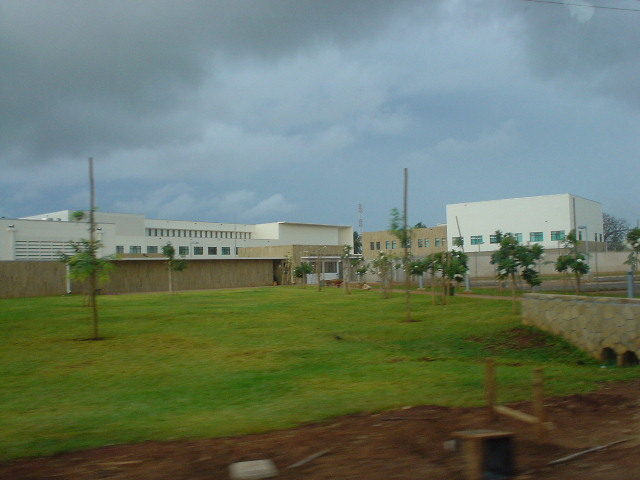
Embassy of the United States in Dar es Salaam

== See also ==
- Foreign relations of Tanzania
- Foreign relations of the United States
