= Kristie Canegallo =

American government official (born 1979)

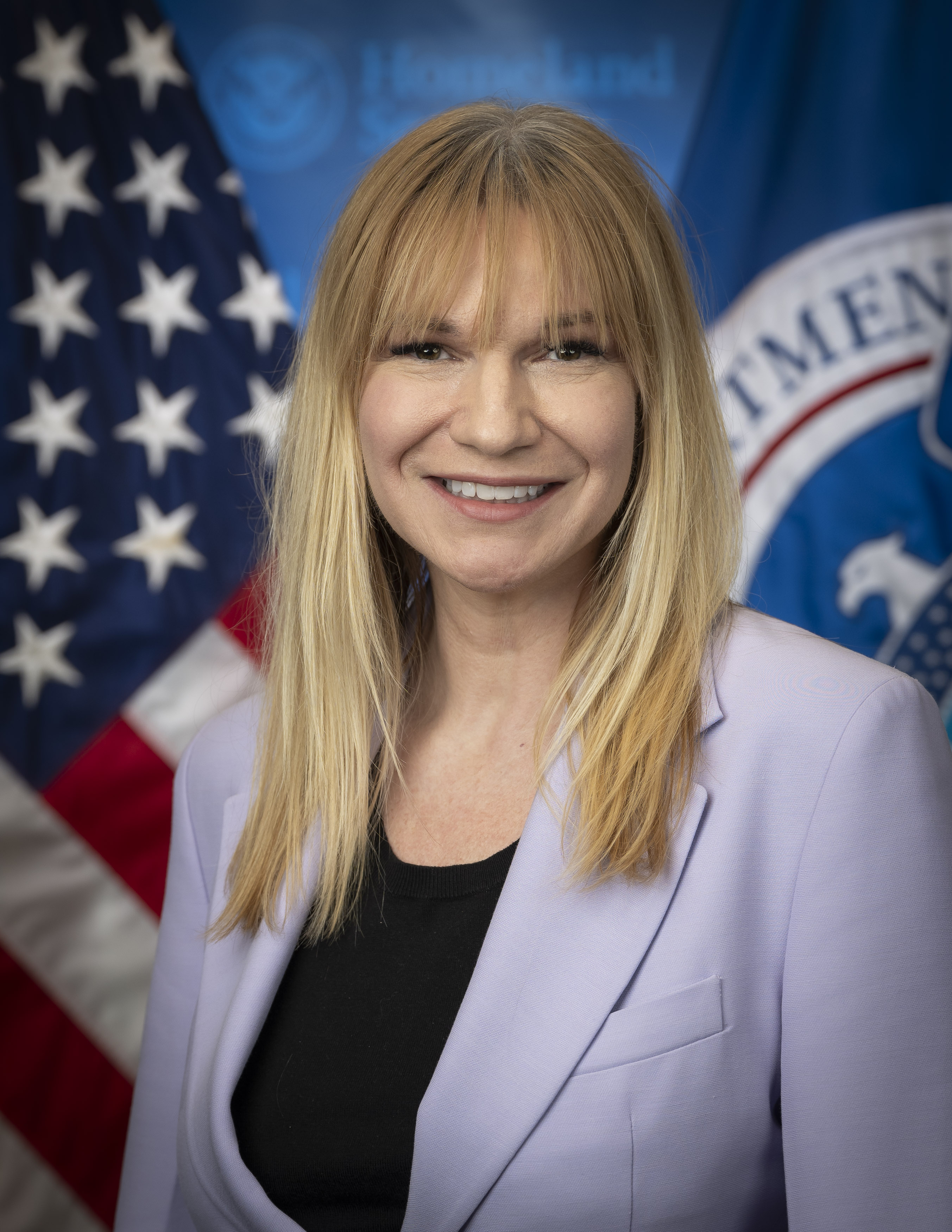

Acting United States Deputy Secretary of Homeland Security
- In office July 21, 2023 – January 20, 2025
- President: Joe Biden
- Preceded by: John Tien
- Succeeded by: MaryAnn Tierney (acting)

White House Deputy Chief of Staff for Policy Implementation
- In office May 22, 2014 – January 20, 2017
- President: Barack Obama
- Preceded by: Mark Childress (Planning)
- Succeeded by: Rick Dearborn (Policy); Katie Walsh (Implementation)

Personal details
- Born: 1979 (age 46–47)
- Party: Democratic
- Education: Colgate University (BA); Johns Hopkins University (MA)

Kristie Canegallo (born 1979) is a former U.S. government official who served as the acting United States deputy secretary of homeland security (DHS) from July 2023 to January 2025. She joined DHS in January 2022 as its chief of staff. Canegallo was a White House deputy chief of staff for policy implementation from 2014 to 2017.

== Career ==
Canegallo was born in 1979 and raised in Springfield, Massachusetts by a single mother who was a school teacher. She earned a B.A. from Colgate University in 2001. Following graduation, she worked for Goldman Sachs on Wall Street for three years. She completed a M.A. in strategic studies from the Johns Hopkins School of Advanced International Studies in 2004.

Canegallo is a member of the Democratic Party. Beginning in 2005, she took an unpaid internship with the United States Department of Defense. In 2007, she worked at the Embassy of the United States, Kabul for five months. The next year, she worked in Iraq for a United States Marine Corps unit on governance issues during the Anbar campaign.

In October 2008, Canegallo began working with the National Security Council during the Bush administration. She served as its director for defense policy and later senior advisor Denis McDonough, the U.S. deputy national security advisor. She worked there until 2012. From 2014 to 2017, she was an assistant to the president and a White House deputy chief of staff. Her responsibilities included the execution of the Affordable Care Act and health care, immigration, and cybersecurity.

Canegallo was Google's vice president of trust and safety from 2018 to 2021, where she led the global team that developed and enforced Google's product policies to keep people safe while using Google products.

In January 2022, she became the chief of staff at the United States Department of Homeland Security. She has worked on policies regarding migrants and asylum seekers at the Mexico–United States border and Title 42 expulsions. In June 2023, it was announced that she would become acting Deputy Secretary of Homeland Security on July 21, following the retirement of John Tien.

Political offices
Preceded by Mark Childress as White House Deputy Chief of Staff for Planning	White House Deputy Chief of Staff for Policy Implementation; 2014–2017	Succeeded by Rick Dearborn as White House Deputy Chief of Staff for Policy
Preceded by Mark Childress as White House Deputy Chief of Staff for Planning	White House Deputy Chief of Staff for Policy Implementation; 2014–2017	Succeeded by Katie Walsh as White House Deputy Chief of Staff for Implementation
Preceded by John Tien	United States Deputy Secretary of Homeland Security; Acting; 2023–2025	Succeeded by MaryAnn Tierney; Acting
