= William K. Leonhart =

American diplomat

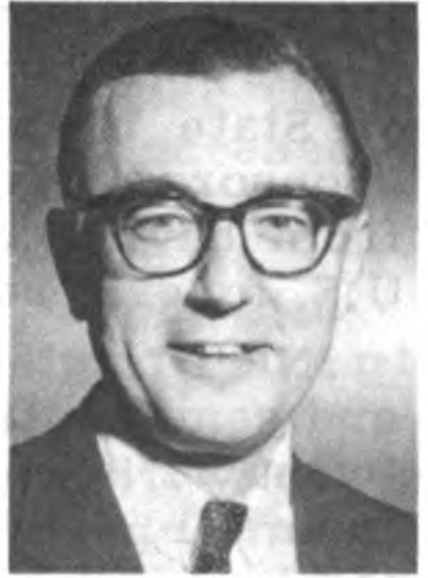

US Ambassador to Tanzania
- In office August 22, 1962 – December 22, 1965
- President: Lyndon B. Johnson
- Preceded by: Inaugural holder
- Succeeded by: John H. Burns

US Ambassador to Yugoslavia
- In office May 1, 1969 – October 18, 1971
- President: Richard Nixon
- Preceded by: Charles Burke Elbrick
- Succeeded by: Malcolm Toon

William K. Leonhart (1919 – 1997) was an American diplomat and the first U.S. Ambassador to Tanzania. He also served as Special Assistant to President Lyndon B. Johnson.

== Early life and career ==
William Kahn Leonhart was born in Parkersburg, West Virginia. He graduated from the West Virginia University in 1939 with his bachelor's degree. He later received his master's and PhD from Princeton University. In 1943, Leonhart joined the Army Air Corps. One year later he married Florence Lydia Sloan and joined the U.S. Foreign Service.

As a Foreign Service Officer, Leonhart served tours in Buenos Aires, Belgrade, Rome, French Indochina, Tokyo, and London. He was stationed in Yugoslavia in 1946 when Tito came into power. Leonhart attended the Imperial Defense College in 1958. In 1959 in Tokyo, he was promoted to Deputy Chief of Mission, the second in command in an embassy, with the personal rank of Minister. He remained in Tokyo until 1962. For his last year in Tokyo, he served as the chargé d'affaires.

In 1962, Leonhart was bestowed the ambassadorship. He was originally assigned to be the US Ambassador to Tanganika, a sovereign state comprising the majority of today's mainland Tanzania. In 1964, Tanganika merged with Zanzibar and was renamed the United Republic of Tanzania. Leonhart remained in Tanzania until 1965.

After his time in Tanzania, he worked with Ambassador Robert Daniel Murphy on the Presidential Transition Staff before serving as Special Assistant to the President.

By 1969, Leonhart held the position of Career Minister in the Foreign Service. He returned to Yugoslavia, this time as the ambassador. While in this position, Leonhart arranged a state visit by President Richard Nixon, Buzz Aldrin, and Neil Armstrong who were on an international goodwill tour. Leonhart served as ambassador to Yugoslavia until 1971.

He returned to the states and served as the Deputy Commandant for International Affairs at the National War College from 1972 to 1975. After leaving the National War College, Leonhart was assigned as diplomat-in-residence to the College of William and Mary. In 1979, he was the chairman of the Senior Intelligence Review Panel at the Central Intelligence Agency. This panel serves to facilitate and moderate interagency cooperation, among other things.

== Legacy ==
The Leonharts were art enthusiasts. They amassed a large art collection from their time abroad, focused mainly on Japanese and African art. Together, Leonhart and his wife started the Daval Foundation in 1980 to educate young artists and hold public exhibitions. William Leonhart served as the president of the foundation. Through the Daval Foundation, art from the Leonharts' collection has been displayed at the Smithsonian Institution, the Asian Art Museum of San Francisco, and the Los Angeles County Museum of Art.

Leonhart's personal papers are archived at the John F. Kennedy Presidential Library.

== See also ==
- The creation of the United Republic of Tanzania
