= W. Beverly Carter Jr. =

American diplomat (1921–1982)

W. Beverly Carter, Jr.
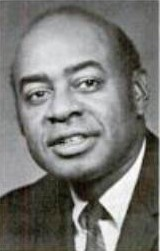

US Ambassador to Tanzania
- In office June 27, 1972 – October 14, 1975
- President: Richard Nixon; Gerald Ford
- Preceded by: Claude G. Ross
- Succeeded by: James W. Spain

US Ambassador to Liberia
- In office April 6, 1976 – January 1, 1979
- President: Gerald Ford; Jimmy Carter
- Preceded by: Melvin L. Manfull
- Succeeded by: Robert P. Smith

William Beverly Carter Jr. (1921 – May 9, 1982), served three American presidents as U.S. Ambassador to Tanzania and Liberia and became the first African American named Ambassador-at-Large.

== Career ==
Beverly Carter was born in Coatesville, Pennsylvania in 1921 and grew up in Philadelphia.

A newsman, who later operated a public relations firm, he began as a journalist, helping to edit the Philadelphia Tribune and "The Afro-American". He then became the publisher of the Pittsburgh Courier.

Carter ran for Pennsylvania's Fourth Congressional District in 1954. After a hard-fought victory in the Republican primary, he lost to incumbent Earl Chudoff, a Democrat, in the general election.

A keen student of African affairs, he made his first visit to that continent in 1952 and subsequently visited 40 African nations. Prior to his ambassadorial assignments, as a career officer in the United States Foreign Service, Carter served in Kenya shortly after independence and in Nigeria during the Biafra War. His early exposure followed an invitation from a Lincoln schoolmate, Kwame Nkrumah, to visit Ghana to observe the early days of independence in that former colony.

From 1969 to 1972, Carter held the office of principal Deputy Assistant Secretary of State for African Affairs. Appointed on June 27, 1972, as U.S. Ambassador to Tanzania, he left his post on October 14, 1975. On April 6, 1976, he was appointed to be ambassador to Liberia. He held that position until January 1, 1979. On February 9, 1979, he was appointed as "Ambassador at Large" for liaison with state and local governments. His appointment terminated on January 16, 1981. In addition to his official State department duties, he served as a private citizen on the United Nations Sub-Commission on Prevention of Discrimination and Protection of Minorities from 1972 until his death.

Carter's tenure as ambassador to Tanzania ended in controversy over his role in the negotiations for the release of four students (3 Americans from Stanford University, 1 Dutch) kidnapped by rebel leader & future president Laurent Kabila from Zaire. After the student's release had been secured, negotiated by their families, secretary of state Henry Kissinger recalled Ambassador Carter and canceled his pre-arranged next appointment as ambassador to Denmark. The departmental position was that improper lines were crossed in an effort to save the students. Following intense public and congressional pressure, including a New York Times editorial, Ambassador Carter was promoted and assigned to Liberia. On reflection on the aftermath of the controversy, Carter said, "Once you start thinking of one life as different from a thousand lives, you've lost it all." (NYT Editorial,"Humane Diplomat", August 14, 1975)

Ambassador Carter was ultimately awarded State Department's highest citation, the Distinguished Honor Award, and the highest civilian award from Liberia, the Order of African Redemption. The official papers of W. Beverly Carter Jr. are preserved at the Library of Congress.

=== Education ===
Carter earned a bachelor's degree in biology from Lincoln University in 1944, and his law degree from the Temple University Beasley School of Law in 1947. He also studied at the New School of Social Research in Manhattan.

=== Family ===
In 1946, Carter married Alice Rosalie Terry (maiden; 1924–2005), which ended in divorce. In 1971, Carter married Carlyn Butler Brown (maiden), widow of William Godfrey Pogue (1921–1968), from whom he was separated at the time of his death. He had a son from his first marriage, William Beverly Carter III, and through him, a grandson, Terence Sebekos Carter. His paternal grandmother, Jennie Carter (née Elizabeth Jennie Adams; 1852–1891) was a distinguished educator.

=== Death ===
Carter died on Sunday, May 9, 1982, at Suburban Hospital in Bethesda, Maryland of a heart attack.

Diplomatic posts
Preceded by Claude G. Ross	U.S. Ambassador to Tanzania; 1972–1975	Succeeded by James W. Spain
Preceded by Melvin L. Manfull	United States Ambassador to Liberia; 1976–1979	Succeeded by Robert P. Smith
