= J. Brady Anderson =

American diplomat

Brady Anderson

Administrator of the United States Agency for International Development
- In office August 2, 1999 – January 20, 2001
- President: Bill Clinton
- Preceded by: J. Brian Atwood
- Succeeded by: Andrew Natsios

United States Ambassador to Tanzania
- In office September 13, 1994 – October 7, 1997
- President: Bill Clinton
- Preceded by: Peter Jon de Vos
- Succeeded by: Charles Stith

Personal details
- Born: 1945 (age 80–81)
- Party: Democratic
- Education: Rhodes College (BA); University of Arkansas (JD)

J. Brady Anderson (born 1945) is an attorney, former American ambassador (Tanzania 1994–1997), administrator of the United States Agency for International Development (USAID) (1999–2001), and chairman of the board of the Overseas Private Investment Corporation. He is chairman of the board of the Institute for Global Engagement (IGE).

It was the intention of the American Foreign Service Association (AFSA) to oppose Anderson's nomination for the Ambassadorship not based on a lack of qualifications but because “Anderson's nomination is the latest in a series of White House decisions to replace career-officer ambassadors, who have been in their embassies only a short time, with political appointees. In AFSA's view, this practice seriously threatens the unwritten but long-standing rule that a U.S. ambassador's normal tour of duty should be three years.”

Anderson's tenure as USAID Administrator was seen as calm and absent major scandals or breakthroughs. One observer of USAID stated that Anderson was on "cruise control" for most his time at the helm.

Anderson received a B.A. from Rhodes College in Memphis, Tennessee in 1967, and a J.D. from the University of Arkansas School of Law in 1973. He went on to work as a private attorney in Helena, Arkansas, assistant attorney general in Little Rock, Arkansas, as a special assistant to Governor Bill Clinton and as senior law clerk to U.S. District Judge Elsijane T. Roy of Little Rock.

Diplomatic posts
Preceded by Peter Jon de Vos	United States Ambassador to Tanzania; 1994–1997	Succeeded by Charles Stith
Political offices
Preceded by J. Brian Atwood	Administrator of the United States Agency for International Development; 1999–2001	Succeeded by Andrew Natsios
