= Charles Richard Stith =

American diplomat

United States Ambassador to Tanzania
- In office 1998–2001
- President: Bill Clinton

Personal details
- Born: St. Louis, Missouri, U.S.
- Spouse: Dr. Deborah Prothrow-Stith
- Profession: Diplomat

Charles R. Stith (born 29 August 1949) is an American businessman, diplomat, former educator, author and politician. He is currently the Chairman of The Pula Group, LLC., which invests in high value opportunities in Africa. He is the non-executive chairman of the African Presidential Leadership Center, a Johannesburg-based NGO focused on leadership development and tracking economic and political trends in Africa. He established and formerly directed Boston University's African Presidential Center. Prior to this, Stith presented his letter of credence as Ambassador Extraordinary and Plenipotentiary of the United States to the United Republic of Tanzania in September 1998. He served as the Ambassador in the traumatic period after the August 1998 bombing of the United States Embassy in Dar es Salaam. Because of his leadership, the Embassy emerged from the bombing stable, and set a new standard for U.S. embassies promoting U.S. trade and investment in Africa. Stith worked with the Tanzanian government to enable them to become one of the first Sub-Saharan African countries to reach the decision point for debt relief under the enhanced Heavily-Indebted Poor Countries Initiative (HIPC).

After his ambassadorship, Stith received an appointment to the Faculty of the Boston University Department of International Relations, and taught a course on Africa and Globalization. He retired from Boston University in 2015. He was formerly on the Advisory Committee of the Office of the U.S. Trade Representative, and is a member of the Council on Foreign Relations and the Council of American Ambassadors. Ambassador Stith is the author of For Such a Time as This: African Leadership Challenges (APARC Press, 2008) and Political Religion (Abingdon Press, 1995). He is also the Senior Editor of the annual African Leaders State of Africa Report and author of many articles, which have appeared in such publications as the African Business Magazine, Wall Street Journal, Denver Post, Atlanta Journal-Constitution, Boston Globe, Boston Herald, USA Today, Los Angeles Times, New York Times, and Chicago Sun Times.

Ambassador Stith is a graduate of Baker University, the Interdenominational Theological Center's Gammon Theological Seminary in Atlanta, and Harvard University Divinity School (Th.M). He is the founder and former National President of the Organization for a New Equality (ONE), which focuses on expanding economic opportunities for minorities and women. During his tenure at ONE, he helped negotiate and broker the first comprehensive community reinvestment agreement in the country. The agreement committed Boston financial institutions to $500 million in mortgage and commercial lending to low- and moderate-income and minority communities in Massachusetts.

He later served on the CRA Regulatory Agency Working Group, chaired by then Comptroller of the Currency Eugene Ludwig. He was one of the architects of the regulations redefining the Community Reinvestment Act (CRA), which has resulted in nearly $2 trillion in credit and capital for low- and moderate-income communities and communities of color.

Prior to heading ONE, he was the Senior Minister of the historic Union United Methodist Church in Boston. In 1983, while at Union Church Stith negotiated a minority hiring pact with the Boston Globe. It was the first such agreement between a major daily newspaper and outside organization. The five-year agreement included provisions for hiring, procurement, and a board appointment. He was an appointee of then Senate Minority Leader Tom Daschle to the U.S. Commission on International Religious Freedom. He has been an adjunct faculty member at Boston College and Harvard Divinity School. He has served on the National Advisory Boards of FannieMae and Fleet InCity Bank, the editorial board of WCVB-TV, and the boards of West Insurance, Inc. and the Wang Center for Performing Arts, among others. He is the recipient of honorary doctorates from the University of South Carolina, Elizabeth City University, Clark Atlanta University, and Baker University.

In addition to his work in civic, political, and business sectors, he collects African and African American art. He is a commentator on political and economic trends in Africa.

== Selected publications ==
- Stith, Charles (Editor); For Such A Time as This: African Leadership Challenges; APARC Press, 2008
- Stith, Charles; Political Religion; Abingdon Press, 1995
- Stith, Charles (Senior Editor), The State of Africa Report 2012 (APC)
- Stith, Charles (Senior Editor), The State of Africa Report 2011 (APARC)
- Stith, Charles (Senior Editor), The State of Africa Report 2010 (APARC)
- Stith, Charles (Senior Editor), The State of Africa Report 2009 (APARC)
- Stith, Charles (Senior Editor), The State of Africa Report 2008 (APARC)
- Stith, Charles (Senior Editor), The State of Africa Report 2007 (APARC)
- Stith, Charles (Senior Editor), The State of Africa Report 2006 (APARC)
- Stith, Charles (Senior Editor), The State of Africa Report 2005 (APARC)
- Stith, Charles (Senior Editor), The State of Africa Report 2004 (APARC)
- Stith, Charles (Senior Editor), The State of Africa Report 2003 (APARC)
- Stith, Charles (Senior Editor), The State of Africa Report 2002 (APARC)
- Stith, Charles, “For Africa, Energy is Destiny”, Africa Business Magazine, August/September 2012
- Stith, Charles, “Dark Continent sees light”, Boston Herald, January 2012
- Stith, Charles, “The Arab Spring: How to Contain Spontaneous Social Combustion”, African Business Magazine, May 2011
- Stith, Charles, "The Youth Will Lead the Twitterlution", Sunday Times (South Africa) March 20, 2011
- Stith, Charles, “Foreign Aid Sows Hope for Democracy,” Boston Globe, February 11, 2008

Diplomatic posts
Preceded by J. Brady Anderson	United States Ambassador to Tanzania; 1998–2001	Succeeded by Robert V. Royall
