= Institute of Politics =

Institute of Politics may refer to:

== United States ==
=== Northeast ===
- Institute of Politics at Harvard Kennedy School, in Massachusetts
- New Hampshire Institute of Politics at Saint Anselm College, in New Hampshire
- Eagleton Institute of Politics at Rutgers University, in New Jersey

=== Washington, D.C. ===
- Georgetown Institute of Politics and Public Service at Georgetown University, in Washington, D.C.

=== Midwest ===
- Robert J. Dole Institute of Politics at the University of Kansas
- University of Chicago Institute of Politics, in Illinois

=== West ===
- Hinckley Institute of Politics at the University of Utah
- USC Center for the Political Future at the University of Southern California

== France ==
- Instituts d'études politiques, nine publicly owned institutions of higher learning in France
