= Next Foundation =

New Zealand philanthropic foundation

NEXT Foundation
- Formation: 2014
- Type: Philanthropic organisation
- Location: Auckland, New Zealand
- Board of directors: Chris Liddell (Chair), Carol Campbell, Scott St John, Bill Kermode, Peter Plowman, Simon Plowman
- Key people: Andrew Grant (CEO), Devon Mclean, Jon Hartley
- Website: www.nextfoundation.org.nz

The NEXT Foundation is a privately funded New Zealand strategic philanthropy foundation focused on conservation projects with the vision to inspiring New Zealand to become the world's first Nature Positive country. It invests in a small number of multi-year initiatives with both financial and non-financial support. It targets initiatives that are transformational, with multi-year commitments, and large aspirational goals.

NEXT was established in 2014 by New Zealand philanthropists Neal and Annette Plowman, who support the philosophy of giving while living and have a long history of philanthropy in New Zealand. Before the formation of NEXT most of their philanthropy was managed discreetly, via a charitable trust. The couple encourage everyone in a position of privilege to give away at least half their wealth during their lifetime.

NEXT had an endowment of NZ$100 million in 2014 to spend down over 10 years into environmental and educational projects that would benefit future generations of New Zealanders. The Plowmans donated a further NZ$150 million in 2026 to continue supporting environmental initiatives for another 10 years.

== Projects ==
=== Environment ===
Zero Invasive Predators (ZIP) is a development and research organisation focused on technologies and processes to keep large areas of New Zealand's mainland free of predators (primarily rats, stoats and possums) to regenerate New Zealand's native bird life. ZIP is also supported by the New Zealand Department of Conservation, local philanthropists Gareth and Sam Morgan and some major dairy companies, including Fonterra, Open Country, Synlait, Miraka, Tatua and Westland Milk Products.

Project Taranaki Mounga is a ten-year $24 million project, controlling pests and reintroducing native bird and bat species in the 34,000 ha of Egmont National Park. It is a partnership between NEXT Foundation, the Department of Conservation, local iwi, Shell, TSB Community Trust, Landcare Research, Jasmine Social Investments and the wider Taranaki community. A milestone for the project was hit in April 2017 where the North Island robin was reintroduced. The project was the winner of the Philanthropy and Partnership category in that year's Green Ribbon Awards.

Predator Free Wellington City is a partnership between the NEXT Foundation, Wellington City Council and the Greater Wellington Regional Council, to make Wellington the first predator-free capital in the world. NEXT Foundation has also supported Kelvin Hastie as the NEXT Predator Free Community Champion to help make this project a success.

Rotoroa Island is an island in the Hauraki Gulf next to Waiheke Island. The Rotoroa Island Trust's vision is for the island to become a sanctuary where people can experience the wonder of New Zealand wildlife. Rotoroa Island is a conservation park in the Hauraki Gulf for endangered species like kiwi and takahē, and also offers an environmental educational programme for schools through its strong relationship with Auckland Zoo.

Project Janszoon aims to transform the ecological prospects of the Abel Tasman National Park. Project Janszoon is part of the Tomorrow Accord which commits the government to maintaining the projects once they have achieved agreed ecological indicators. Project Janszoon was the winner of the Conservation, Habitat and Diversity section of the Green Ribbon Environmental Awards.

Additional current projects include Predator Free South Westland, Hauraki Gulf Restoration, The Native Carbon Initiative, Predator Free Rakiura, and Te Manahuna Aoraki.

=== Education ===
Springboard Trust provides leadership and strategic skills programmes for school principals that improve the learning outcomes for students. Next Foundation is helping Springboard expand its 'Strategic Leadership for Principals' programme throughout New Zealand in the coming years.

The Mind Lab by Unitec is an institution based in Auckland that is focused on up-skilling teachers in technology and modern teaching methods. The program provides a modern postgraduate qualification for educators that teaches them how to implement this new approach into their classrooms. Currently based in Auckland, Wellington, Christchurch and Gisborne, NEXT Foundation is helping Mind Lab expand into other centres across New Zealand and also funding scholarships for up to 1,350 new teachers to complete the programme.

Manaiakalani Outreach is an expansion of the successful Manaiakalani approach, piloted in and around Pt England School in East Auckland, into five clusters of schools throughout low socio-economic communities in New Zealand. Manaiakalani Outreach will provide this proven digital approach to over 8,500 students throughout New Zealand. The Manaiakalani Outreach programme uses an evidence based system with collaborative learning pedagogies enhanced by modern digital learning environments incorporated in a full community approach to increasing the learning outcomes for their students.

Ngā Pūmanawa e Waru aims to improve learning outcomes for all students in the city of Rotorua. It uses collaborative learning pedagogies within and between schools, enhanced by digital teaching environments to do this. Ngā Pūmanawa e Waru is equipping students with digital devices and up-skilling teachers to reduce the education inequality faced in Rotorua.

Talking Matters is a programme that promotes the importance of talking with babies. This programme is designed to address the differences in language children have when they start school. It is a community-based programme that focusses on the child's brain development in the first 0–3 years.

Teach First NZ recruits graduates to bring knowledge, energy and leadership to teach in secondary schools serving lower decile communities. Their vision extends beyond the two years in the classroom to encourage debate and action in response to system-wide factors, outside the control of a school, that impact upon educational outcomes.
