= Geoffrey Lewis (philatelist) =

Australian philatelist

- Occupation: Philatelist

Geoffrey Lewis FRPSL is an Australian philatelist who was appointed to the Roll of Distinguished Philatelists in 2018. He is a member of the Australian Philatelic Order and has received the Australian Philatelic Research Award.
