= Mark B. Childress =

United States government official

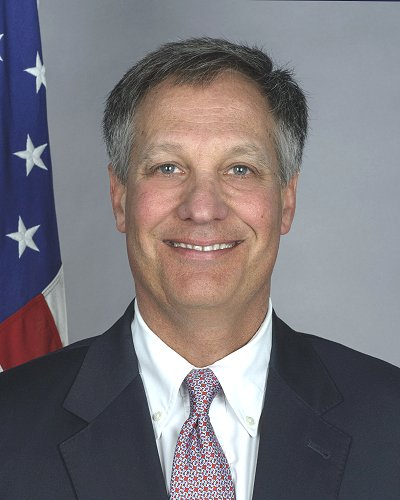

United States Ambassador to Tanzania
- In office May 22, 2014 – October 25, 2016
- President: Barack Obama
- Preceded by: Alfonso Lenhardt
- Succeeded by: Don J. Wright (2020)

White House Deputy Chief of Staff for Planning
- In office January 2012 – May 22, 2014
- President: Barack Obama
- Chief of Staff: Jack Lew; Denis McDonough
- Preceded by: Position established
- Succeeded by: Kristie Canegallo (Policy Implementation)

Personal details
- Born: Mark Bradley Childress; 1959 (age 66–67) Asheville, North Carolina, U.S.
- Party: Democratic
- Education: Yale University (BA); University of North Carolina, Chapel Hill (JD)

Mark Bradley Childress (born 1959) is the former United States Ambassador to Tanzania and former Deputy Chief of Staff for Planning in the administration of President Obama. Previously, he served in the Department of Health and Human Services and on Capitol Hill.

On July 8, 2013, President Obama announced his intent to nominate Childress to be United States Ambassador to Tanzania. On July 9, 2013, his nomination was sent to the Senate.

He received a hearing before the United States Senate Committee on Foreign Relations on September 24, 2013. He was reported out of committee on October 31, 2013, and again on January 15, 2014. He was confirmed to his ambassadorship by voice vote on April 7, 2014. He presented his credentials to President Jakaya Mrisho Kikwete on May 22, 2014. On October 25, 2016, Childress stepped down as the U.S. ambassador to Tanzania.

Political offices
New office	White House Deputy Chief of Staff for Planning; 2012–2014	Succeeded by Kristie Canegallo
Diplomatic posts
Preceded by Alfonso Lenhardt	United States Ambassador to Tanzania; 2014–2016	Succeeded by Virginia Blaser; Acting
