= Claude A. Buss =

American historian (1903–1998)

- Buss, circa 1940
- Born: 29 November 1903; Sunbury, Pennsylvania
- Died: 17 November 1998 (aged 94); Palo Alto, California
- Education: Washington Missionary College (B.A.); Susquehanna University (M.A.); University of Pennsylvania (Ph.D.); Paris Institute of Political Studies
- Scientific career
- Fields: History; Political Science
- Workplaces: University of Southern California; Stanford University; University of the Philippines; National War College; San Jose State University; Naval Postgraduate School

Claude Albert Buss (29 November 1903 – 17 November 1998) was a professor emeritus of history and a key American diplomat in the Philippines during World War II. Although not formally counted as one of the State Department's "China Hands", he was a U.S. Foreign Service Officer in Beijing and Nanjing prior to the war, and served in multiple U.S. government and policy advisory positions covering East Asia for almost seven decades. As an academic, he taught at the University of Southern California, Stanford University, and the Naval Postgraduate School. Buss authored multiple texts which became standard reference works in the field of East Asian studies and influenced generations of American civilian and military leaders and policy makers working in and around East Asia.

== Early life ==
Buss was born in Sunbury, Pennsylvania on November 29, 1903. He received a B.A. from Washington Missionary College in 1922, an M.A. from Susquehanna University in 1924, and a Ph.D. from the University of Pennsylvania in 1927.

== Service in China ==
After continuing his studies at the Paris Institute of Political Studies, he became a U.S. Foreign Service officer, serving in the U.S. legation in Beiping from 1927 to 1928 and as vice-consul in Nanjing from 1931 to 1934. That same year, he went on to join the faculty of the University of Southern California, where he lectured until 1941.

== World War II ==
Shortly before Pearl Harbor in 1941, Buss left USC to become executive assistant to the U.S. High Commissioner in the Philippines, who at this time was Francis Bowes Sayre, Sr. As the ranking U.S. State Department official left behind when the Japanese invaded, Buss surrendered Manila to the Japanese on January 2, 1942. He attempted to block the efforts of Chick Parsons to present himself and his family as Panamanian nationals during the early days of the Japanese Occupation, not realizing that Parsons was laying the groundwork for what would become Manila's Fil-Am underground espionage network.

Buss was held with other Americans in a private home until June 1942, and was then transferred to Tokyo, where he was held until his repatriation aboard the MS Gripsholm (ironically, the same ship which delivered Chick Parsons and his family to New York) as part of a prisoner exchange in November 1943. After repatriation, he directed the San Francisco Office of War Information for a year. In 1945–46, he also served as a consultant to the War Department's Strategic Bombing Survey of Japan.

== Academic career ==
In 1946, he joined Stanford's history faculty teaching courses on Southeast Asia, China, and American policies toward Asia, a post he would keep for twenty three years. During this time, he also served as a civilian consultant in the information and education segment of General MacArthur's staff for the Allied occupation of Japan. He would later serve as a special Southeast Asia consultant to the U.S. Embassy in Japan from 1948 to 1949.

On a parallel track with his academic career, Professor Buss seized every opportunity to share his knowledge of world affairs with domestic civilian audiences. From church groups to professional associations, he enthusiastically presented up-to-the-minute talks, each carefully logged in a binder kept in his study. Eventually this skill brought him to the attention of the State Department's programs for promoting international understanding through speaking tours and scholarly exchanges. This allowed him to visit Asia at least once every year until his 92nd year, meeting scholars around the Pacific Rim and offering, in return for their views, his own.

In 1957 and 1959, Buss was named a Fulbright exchange professor at the University of the Philippines, and was named a Carnegie teaching fellow in international law. A former director of studies at the National War College in Washington, D.C., Buss was also named to a panel of advisers to the State Department's Bureau of East Asian and Pacific Affairs. In 1968 he received a State Department "scroll of honor" recognizing "devoted service to the cause of Philippine-American friendship and understanding for more than a quarter of a century."

After his retirement from Stanford University, Claude Buss was named in 1977 acting dean of academic affairs at the Monterey Institute of Foreign Studies and as an instructor in Asian studies. He also taught on an occasional basis at C.S.U. San Jose. In a final contribution to the academic study of Asia, he taught at the Naval Postgraduate School in Monterey California, where he conveyed a lifetime of experience to many military officers from all the US services. He continued to travel regularly to the Philippines and to other parts of Asia, where he was received by influential political, educational, and cultural leaders.

== Death ==
Claude Buss remained physically and mentally in good health for most of his life until he suffered a stroke at the age of 93. He died in his home in Palo Alto, California on November 17, 1998. Pre-deceased by his wife and younger daughter, he was survived by his older daughter and her husband, four grandchildren, and five great-grandchildren.

== Publications ==
He was the author of the following books:

- War and Diplomacy in Eastern Asia (1941)
- The Far East (1955)
- Southeast Asia and the World Today (1958)
- Arc of Crisis (1961)
- Asia in the Modern World (1964)
