= David Charles Miller Jr. =

American lawyer and diplomat

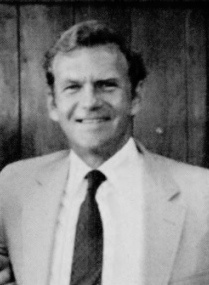

United States Amabassador to Zimbabwe
- In office May 31, 1984 – April 17, 1986
- President: Ronald Reagan

United States Amabassador to Tanzania
- In office November 4, 1981 – February 28, 1984
- President: Ronald Reagan

Personal details
- Born: July 15, 1942 (age 83) Cleveland, Ohio, U.S.
- Party: Republican

David Charles Miller Jr. (born July 15, 1942) is an American lawyer and diplomat who served as the American ambassador to Tanzania from 1981 to 1984, and Zimbabwe from 1984 to 1986. He worked for the United States National Security Council and was a member of the United States African Development Foundation's board of directors.

== Early life and education ==
David Charles Miller Jr. was born in Cleveland, Ohio, on July 15, 1942. He was descended from Huguenots who went to Switzerland and then Peoria, Illinois. His father served in World War II at Wright-Patterson Air Force Base as a designer for aircraft lighting.

During Miller's time in high school he went to Takamatsu, Japan, using a scholarship from the AFS Intercultural Programs and lived there for a few months in 1957. Miller attended Harvard College from 1960 to 1964, from University of Michigan Law School with a Juris Doctor, and received an honorary Doctor of Law from Lewis & Clark College. He was a member of the District of Columbia Bar.

From 1967 to 1968, Miller was in South Vietnam as part of a group sent by the Simulmatics Corporation. He determined that the Vietnam War was unwinnable during his visit and claimed that Edward Lansdale expressed the same view in a meeting the two had. The Tet Offensive occurred during Miller's time in South Vietnam. Miller's work for Westinghouse Electric Corporation brought him to Iran, Egypt, Brazil, the United Kingdom, Japan, and South Korea.

== Career ==
=== Nixon administration ===
Miller served as a White House Fellow in 1968 and 1969, and was director of the White House Fellows from 1970 to 1971. During Richard Nixon's administration, Miller worked as confidential assistant to Attorney General John N. Mitchell for a year and a half, then was moved to the White House, where he worked with legal counsel John Dean. In 2003, Miller recalled one of his early interactions with Dean involved a request that Miller "set up a safe house here in Washington for the use of the president," for what was intended to be "a completely covert White House operation." Miller said, "I knew at that point that I was going to have to leave. I just said to myself: 'This is insane.'"

=== Diplomacy ===
His friend Peter F. Krogh, another White House Fellow, introduced Miller to Chester Crocker. Crocker was appointed as Assistant Secretary of State for African Affairs and asked Miller to become ambassador to Tanzania. On October 26, 1981, Miller was appointed on October 26, 1981, and presented his credentials on November 4, 1981. He served as ambassador until February 28, 1984.

On March 30, 1984, he was appointed as ambassador to Zimbabwe. He presented his credentials on May 31, 1984, and served until April 17, 1986. Miller pushed for the United States to end its aid program for Zimbabwe due to Robert Mugabe's criticism of the United States.

On the United States National Security Council he was a special assistant to the president for national security affairs from 23 January 1989, to 31 December 1990. He was a member of the United States African Development Foundation's board of directors.

Miller wrote chapters for Low-Intensity Conflict: Old Threats in a New World, Gray Area Phenomena: Confronting the New World Disorder, and Managing Contemporary Conflict: Pillars of Success.

== Personal life ==
Miller is married. Miller's family and himself were member of the Republican Party and he was a member of the Ripon Society.

== Works cited ==
=== Books ===
- Weekly Compilation of Presidential Documents. Vol. 27. Office of the Federal Register. 1991.

=== Web ===
- "David C. Miller, Jr" (PDF). United States House of Representatives. Archived (PDF) from the original on March 24, 2025.
- "David Charles Miller Jr. (1942–)". Office of the Historian. Archived from the original on June 28, 2025.
- "Interview with Ambassador David C. Miller Jr" (PDF). Library of Congress. January 6, 2003. Archived (PDF) from the original on July 3, 2022.
