= Geoffrey W. Lewis =

American diplomat

Geoffrey Whitney Lewis (born May 20, 1910, Brookline, Massachusetts, died August 1, 1992, Rockland, Maine) was a career diplomat who served as the United States Ambassador to Mauritania and the Central African Republic.

A Harvard graduate, Lewis went on to study at Trinity College in England before becoming headmaster of the Browne and Nichols School, Cambridge, Massachusetts, in 1937. Lewis was a United States Army colonel in London during World War II.

He started at the State Department in 1946 and worked there until his retirement in 1970 while he was Ambassador to Mauritania.

At the time of his death, which was complications from heart and kidney disease, he was 82 years old and lived in Cushing, Maine.
