= List of The Fletcher School of Law and Diplomacy alumni =

This is a list of notable alumni/ae of The Fletcher School of Law and Diplomacy at Tufts University in Medford, Massachusetts.

== Government, diplomacy, and international organizations ==
- Sofyan Abdul Djalil, MALD91, PhD93, minister of information and communication technology (2004–2007); minister of state-owned enterprises (2007–2009); coordinating minister for economic affairs (2014–2015); minister of national development planning and head of National Planning Agency (2015–2016); minister of land affairs and spatial planning and head of Land Affairs Agency (2016–2022) of the Republic of Indonesia
- Rafeeuddin Ahmed, F56, former UN under-secretary general
- Shafi U Ahmed, F86, former high commissioner of Bangladesh to United Kingdom
- Abul Ahsan, F62, former Bangladeshi ambassador to the United States, and member of the executive board of UNESCO
- Yasushi Akashi, F57, senior Japanese diplomat, former undersecretary-general for Humanitarian Affairs and Emergency Relief coordinator at the United Nations
- Bolaji Akinyemi, F66, former foreign minister of Nigeria
- Mimi Alemayehou, F98, executive advisor and chair of Blackstone Africa Infrastructure L.P., former executive vice president of the Overseas Private Investment Corporation, former United States director of the African Development Bank
- Dato Serbini Ali, Brunei's ambassador to the United States
- Joyce Aluoch, GMAP08, judge to the International Criminal Court
- Kaydor Aukatsang, MALD 98, Tibetan politician and advocate
- Anthony Banbury, F92, United Nations assistant secretary-general for Field Support, former special representative of the secretary-general and head of the United Nations Mission for Ebola Emergency Response
- Barbara Bodine, F71, Distinguished Professor in the Practice of Diplomacy and director of the Institute for the Study of Diplomacy at Georgetown University, former U.S. ambassador to Yemen and Kuwait
- Tinatin Bokuchava, leader of women's wing of United National Movement in Georgia
- Matthew Bryza, F88, former deputy assistant secretary of state for European and Eurasian Affairs, former United States ambassador to Azerbaijan
- Richard Burt, F71, former United States chief negotiator on START I and United States chair of Global Zero
- Harold Caballeros, F06, former secretary of state, Ministerio de Relaciones Exteriores de Guatemala
- Dante Caputo, F67, former president of the United Nations General Assembly
- Tom Casey, F87, former deputy assistant secretary for Public Affairs at the United States Department of State
- Aizaz Ahmad Chaudhry, F, Pakistan ambassador to the United States
- Musa Javed Chohan, F84, former high commissioner of Pakistan to Canada, former ambassador to France and Malaysia
- Humayun Rashid Choudhury, F54, former president of the United Nations General Assembly, former speaker of the Bangladesh National Parliament
- Erin Conaton, F95, former United States under secretary of defense for personnel and readiness and former under secretary of the Air Force
- Charles Crawford, former British ambassador to Poland and Serbia
- Walter L. Cutler, F54, former U.S. ambassador to Congo-Kinshasa (1975–79), Tunisia (1982–84), and Saudi Arabia (1984–89)
- C. Richard D'Amato, F67, former member of the United States China Economic and Security Review Commission, former senior foreign policy and defense advisor to the Democratic Senate leader, Senator Robert C. Byrd
- Nathaniel Davis, former senior advisor to President Lyndon Johnson on Soviet and Eastern European affairs, and Assistant Secretary of State for African Affairs
- Giorgos Dimitrakopoulos, F81, Greek politician and Member of the European Parliament
- Michael Dobbs, former chief of staff of the British Conservative party, political thriller novelist
- William B. Edmondson, F51, former U.S. ambassador to South Africa
- J. Adam Ereli, F89, principal deputy assistant secretary for the Bureau of Educational and Cultural Affairs, former United States ambassador to Bahrain
- Hernán Escudero Martínez, F74, Ecuadorian diplomat, former ambassador to the Republic of Peru, former permanent representative to the United Nations and to the WTO in Geneva and former chairman of the UNHCR Executive Committee
- Evelyn Farkas, F99, U.S. deputy assistant secretary of Defense for Russia/Ukraine/Eurasia for the U.S. Department of Defense
- Pieter Feith, F70, head of mission for the European Union-led Aceh Monitoring Mission (AMM)
- Jeffrey Feltman, F83, United Nations under-secretary general for Political Affairs
- Colette Flesch, F61, member of Luxembourg's Parliament, former deputy prime minister and Minister of Foreign Affairs of Luxembourg, former president of the Council of the EU
- Jean Francois-Poncet, F48, member of French Senate, former French foreign minister
- Luis Gallegos, F83, permanent representative of Ecuador to the United Nations, former ambassador of Ecuador to the United States
- Yusuf Garaad Omar, Somalia's presidential special envoy to the Horn of Africa, Gulf of Aden and the Red Sea; former minister of foreign affairs, former ambassador to the United Nations
- Shukri Ghanem, F73, former prime minister of Libya, former Libyan minister of oil and gas
- Maynard W. Glitman, F56, former United States ambassador to Belgium and chief negotiator of the INF Treaty
- Giorgi Gomiashvili, F99, former deputy foreign minister of Georgia
- Kennedy Graham, MP for the Green Party of Aotearoa New Zealand
- Michael A. Hammer, F87, United States ambassador to Chile
- Yoshiaki Harada, member of the House of Representatives in the Japanese Diet
- Bryce Harland, former permanent representative of New Zealand to the United Nations
- Maria Luisa Hayem, F08, minister of economy of El Salvador since 2019
- Douglas Henderson, United States ambassador to Bolivia (1963–1968)
- John E. Herbst, F80, Office of the Coordinator for Reconstruction and Stabilization, U.S. State Department, former ambassador to Ukraine and Uzbekistan
- Robert Hormats, F66, under secretary of state for Economic, Business, and Agricultural Affairs, and former vice chairman, Goldman Sachs
- Raffi Hovannisian, former foreign minister of Armenia, leader of the Heritage party
- Jonathan Howe, F67, former deputy assistant to the president of the United States for national security affairs, former special representative for Somalia to United Nations Secretary-General Boutros Boutros-Ghali
- Wolfgang Ischinger, F73, former ambassador of Germany to the United States and UK, chairman of the Munich Security Conference
- Abdul Ghafar Ismail, Bruneian diplomat
- Roberta S. Jacobson, F86, United States assistant secretary of state for Western Hemisphere Affairs
- Ismat Jahan, F86, ambassador of Bangladesh to Belgium, Luxembourg and the European Communities, former permanent representative of Bangladesh to the United Nations
- Ignasius Jonan, GMAP05, minister of Transportation, Indonesia
- Marina Kaljurand, F95, member of the European Parliament for Estonia, former minister of Foreign Affairs and former Estonian ambassador to Russia, United States, Mexico, and Israel
- Ahmad Kamal, former ambassador and permanent representative of Pakistan to the United Nations
- Kostas Karamanlis, F82, former prime minister of Greece
- Olga Kefalogianni, F06, Greek minister of Tourism
- Shahryar Khan, former special representative of United Nations Secretary-General Boutros Boutros-Ghali to Rwanda, former foreign minister of Pakistan
- Shah A M S Kibria, former minister of Finance of Bangladesh
- Robert R. King, United States special envoy for Human Rights in North Korea
- Michelle Kwan, F11, good-will ambassador; former figure skater
- Enrique Ricardo Lewandowski, F81, current justice and former president of the Supreme Federal Court of Brazil
- Liu Xiaoming, F83, Chinese ambassador to the United Kingdom
- Juan Fernando López Aguilar, F88, chair of the Committee on Civil Liberties, Justice and Home Affairs in European Parliament, former justice minister of Spain
- Winston Lord, F60, former United States assistant secretary of state for East Asian and Pacific Affairs
- Lui Tuck Yew, F94, minister for Transport in Singapore
- William J. Luti, former special assistant to the president and senior director for Defense Policy and Strategy for the National Security Council
- Sarah-Ann Lynch, U.S. ambassador to Guyana
- Graham Maitland, F06, South African ambassador to Sudan
- Edwin W. Martin, former U.S. ambassador to Burma
- Edward E. Masters, F49, former U.S. ambassador to Indonesia and Bangladesh
- Freddy Matungulu, deputy division chief of the International Monetary Fund, former finance minister of the Democratic Republic of the Congo
- David McKean, F86, U.S. ambassador to Luxembourg, former director of Policy Planning at the US Department of State, former chief of staff of the U.S. Senate Committee on Foreign Relations
- Cynthia McKinney, F80, former U.S. representative from Georgia
- Michael R. Meyer, F75, director of communication and speech-writing for the UN secretary general
- Derek Mitchell, current U.S. ambassador to Burma
- William T. Monroe, F73, former U.S. ambassador to Bahrain
- Daniel Patrick Moynihan, F49, former U.S. senator, former U.S. ambassador to Burma
- Bernd Mützelburg, F74, Germany's special envoy for Afghanistan and Pakistan, former ambassador to India
- Harvey Frans Nelson, Jr., F50, former U.S. ambassador to Swaziland
- Phyllis E. Oakley, F57, former United States assistant secretary of state for Population, Refugees, and Migration (1994–97) and assistant secretary of state for Intelligence and Research (1997–99)
- Vartan Oskanian, F83, former foreign minister of Armenia
- Frank Pallone, F63, U.S. representative from New Jersey
- Farah Pandith, F95, special representative to Muslim Communities for the United States Department of State
- Frank Craig Pandolfe, vice admiral of the U.S. Navy
- Michael E. Parmly, former chief of mission of the United States Interests Section in Havana
- Phạm Bình Minh, F92, deputy prime minister and foreign minister of Vietnam
- Thomas R. Pickering, F54, former U.S. ambassador to the United Nations, under secretary of state, and senior VP, international relations, Boeing Co.; namesake of the prestigious Thomas R. Pickering Foreign Affairs Fellowship administered by the U.S. Department of State
- Igor Pokaz, former ambassador of the Republic of Croatia to the Russian Federation
- Masihur Rahman, F80, former representative of Bangladesh to the World Bank, the Asian Development Bank, and the Islamic Development Bank
- Bill Richardson, F71, former governor of New Mexico, former U.S. secretary of energy and U.S. ambassador to the United Nations
- Iqbal Riza, F57, former chief of staff to the UN secretary-general
- Theodore E. Russell, first U.S. ambassador to Slovakia, former deputy assistant administrator for international activities at the Environmental Protection Agency
- Omar Samad, GMAP06, former ambassador of Afghanistan to Canada
- Juan Manuel Santos, F81, Nobel Peace Prize 2016, president of Colombia, former chief executive of the Colombian Coffee Delegation to the International Coffee Organization (ICO), former minister of foreign trade, minister of finance, and minister of defense of Colombia
- Vigen Sargsyan, MALD 00, minister of defense of Armenia (2016–2018), chief of staff to the Office of the President Serzh Sargsyan (2011–2016)
- Surakiart Sathirathai, F80, former foreign minister and deputy prime minister of Thailand
- Antoinette Sayeh, F85, director of the African Department, International Monetary Fund; former finance minister of Liberia
- Klaus Scharioth, F78, former ambassador of Germany to the United States
- Konrad Seitz, F67, German diplomat and scholar, former ambassador to China, India, and Italy
- Radmila Šekerinska, GMAP07, current defense minister of North Macedonia, former deputy prime minister
- Sir David Serpell, F37, former British MP, British Foreign Office; author of the Serpell Report
- Abdulla Shahid, F91, 76th president of the United Nations General Assembly; member of parliament; former speaker of parliament; former minister of foreign affairs, former chief of staff to the president of the Maldives; former chairman of South Asian Speakers and Parliamentarians Association
- Godfrey Smith, GMAP02, former foreign minister of Belize
- Willy Stevens, Belgian ambassador to Colombia, Central America, Mexico and Belize
- William H. Sullivan, F47, former United States ambassador to Iran (1977–1979), the Philippines (1973–1977), and Laos (1964–1969)
- Mulatu Teshome, F90, president of the Federal Democratic Republic of Ethiopia
- Shashi Tharoor, member of parliament of India, former under-secretary general for communications and public information at United Nations
- Mary Thompson-Jones, deputy chief of mission, United States Embassy to the Czech Republic
- Malcolm Toon, F38, former U.S. ambassador (USSR 1963–1979, Czechoslovakia 1969–1971, Yugoslavia 1971–1975, Israel 1975–1976)
- Thomas Vajda, U.S. ambassador
- Sandra Louise Vogelgesang, former deputy assistant secretary of state, and U.S. ambassador to Nepal
- Mary Burce Warlick, United States consul general of Australia, former U.S. ambassador to Serbia
- Hassan Wirajuda, F84, former foreign minister of Indonesia
- Mulatu Teshome Wirtu, F90, president of Ethiopia since 2013
- Peter Woolcott, F82, ambassador and permanent representative of Australia to the United Nations
- Philip D. Zelikow, F95, former counselor of the U.S. Department of State and executive director of the 9/11 Commission
- Edson Zvobgo, founder of Zimbabwe's ruling party Zanu-PF; later critic of Robert Mugabe

== International finance and energy ==
- Peter Ackerman, F69, managing director of Rockport Capital; former director of international capital markets at Drexel Burnham Lambert
- Shukri Ghanem, F73, former Libyan minister of oil and gas; former prime minister of Libya
- Robert Hormats, F66, under secretary of state for Economic, Business, and Agricultural Affairs, and former vice chairman, Goldman Sachs
- Freddy Matungulu, deputy division chief of the International Monetary Fund; former finance minister of the Democratic Republic of the Congo
- Masatsugu Nagato, CEO of Japan Post Holdings; former CEO of Japan Post Bank; former chairman of Citibank Japan
- Bill Richardson, F71, former governor of New Mexico; former U.S. secretary of energy and U.S. ambassador to the United Nations
- Dev Sanyal, F88, CEO of VARO Energy Group, Switzerland; former group executive committee member, bp plc; and non-executive director, Man Group plc and M&G plc
- Antoinette Sayeh, F85, director of the African Department, International Monetary Fund; former finance minister of Liberia
- Walter B. Wriston, F42, former chairman and CEO of Citigroup

== Non-profits and NGOs ==
- Peter Ackerman, F69, founding chair of the International Center on Nonviolent Conflict
- Zainah Anwar, women's rights activist, former head of the Sisters in Islam
- C. Fred Bergsten, F62, senior fellow and director emeritus, former director of the Peterson Institute for International Economics, former United States assistant secretary for International Affairs, U.S. Department of Treasury
- Craig Cohen, executive vice president of the Center for Strategic and International Studies
- Charles H. Dallara, F75, managing director, Institute of International Finance, former assistant secretary for International Affairs, U.S. Department of Treasury
- Dan Doyle, executive director of the Institute for International Sport
- Marsha Evans, F76, former president of the American Red Cross and Girl Scouts of the USA
- Hilary French, vice president for research at the Worldwatch Institute
- Sakiko Fukuda-Parr, founder of the Journal of Human Development; former director of the Human Development Report Office at the World Bank
- Mark Krikorian, executive director of the Center for Immigration Studies
- Brian Mushana Kwesiga, F25, entrepreneur, engineer, and civic leader; former president and CEO, Ugandan North American Association
- Matthew Levitt, director of the Stein Program on Counterterrorism and Intelligence at the Washington Institute for Near East Policy
- Bette Bao Lord, novelist and writer, chair of the board of trustees of Freedom House
- Patrick Meier, author, inventor of crisis mapping and co-founder of WeRobotics
- Jeremy Rifkin, F69, economist and writer, creator of the Foundation On Economic Trends
- Kaare Sandegren, F53, former secretary of international affairs at the Norwegian Confederation of Trade Unions, former member of the Norwegian Nobel Committee
- Crocker Snow, Jr., director of the Edward R. Murrow Center for Public Diplomacy
- Daniel Sokatch, CEO of the New Israel Fund
- Sue Mi Terry, F98, senior fellow for the Korea Chair at the Center for Strategic and International Studies
- Abiodun Williams, former president of The Hague Institute for Global Justice

== Academia ==
- Hassan Abbas, F02, F08, professor, National Defense University
- Lisa Anderson, provost of the American University in Cairo, former professor at Harvard University and SIPA at Columbia University
- Matthew Auer, F90, dean and Arch Professor, University of Georgia School of Public and International Affairs

Laurence Barton, F81, international crisis management and threat assessment expert; FBI instructor; faculty member at Harvard Business School, Penn State, University of Central Florida

- Arnaud Blin, French historian and political scientist, former researcher at the Institut Diplomacie et Défense, the French Institute for Strategic Analysis and the Ecole de la paix de Grenoble
- Clayton Clemens, professor of Government at The College of William and Mary
- Richard N. Current, former Bancroft Prize-winning historian and University of Wisconsin professor
- Harriet Elam-Thomas, director of the Diplomacy Program at the University of Central Florida, former U.S. ambassador to Senegal
- John E. Endicott, F74, vice chancellor of the Solbridge International School of Business and President of Woosong University
- Oliver Everett, CVO, former Royal Librarian to the Sovereign of the United Kingdom
- David W. Kennedy, F79, international legal scholar and vice president of International Affairs at Brown University
- Peter F. Krogh, F66, dean emeritus and Distinguished Professor of International Affairs, Edmund A. Walsh School of Foreign Service at Georgetown University
- Laurence Lafore, professor of history at Swarthmore College and University of Iowa
- Robert Legvold, F63, F64, F67, professor at Columbia University, former director of the Harriman Institute
- Mahmood Mamdani, F69, professor of Government at Columbia University, director of Columbia's Institute of African Studies, former president of the Council for Development of Social Research in Africa
- Satoshi Morimoto, F80, professor of international politics at Takushoku University, member of the Congressional Forum for a New Japan
- Vali Nasr, F84, dean of the Paul H. Nitze School of Advanced International Studies at Johns Hopkins University, former professor of International Politics at the Fletcher School of Law and Diplomacy
- Joseph W. Polisi, F70, president of The Juilliard School
- Mitchell Reiss, vice-provost of International Affairs at the College of William and Mary, former U.S. special envoy for Northern Ireland, and director of Policy Planning at the United States Department of State
- Alan M. Wachman, F84, professor of International Politics at the Fletcher School of Law and Diplomacy
- Norman Wengert, F39, founder of the doctoral program in Environmental Politics and Policy at Colorado State University; author of the seminal work Natural Resources and the Political Struggle
- Wu Teh Yao, former professor of Political Science and vice-chancellor of the National University of Singapore, took part in the drafting of the Universal Declaration of Human Rights while working at the United Nations

== Writers and journalists ==
- Yusuf Hassan Abdi, former director of IRIN
- Doug Bailey, F62, founder of The Hotline, political consultant
- Stephan Berwick, F95, author, martial artist, and actor known for his scholarly research on traditional Chinese martial arts
- Fred D'Ignazio, F71, technology and education writer
- Lord Michael Dobbs, F75, author of the House of Cards trilogy, former adviser to Margaret Thatcher, Conservative Peer
- David Grann, F93, New York Times best-selling author
- Tim Judah, front line reporter for The Economist and author
- Yitzhak Aharon Korff, publisher of The Jewish Advocate, dayan of Boston's rabbinical court
- Shahid Masood, host of talk shows in Pakistan
- Beto Ortiz, Peruvian journalist, critic of Alberto Fujimori's government
- James S. Robbins, F88, USA Today columnist, senior editorial writer for Foreign Affairs at The Washington Times, winner of the chairman of the Joint Chiefs of Staff Joint Meritorious Civilian Service Award
- Abdulaziz Al-Saqqaf, F79, founder of the Yemen Times, Yemen's first English-language newspaper, winner of the National Press Club's International Award for Freedom of the Press
- Howie Severino, F83, Filipino journalist, writer, producer and host, known for his documentaries on GMA Network
- Najmuddin Shaikh, F62, writer for the Daily Times (Pakistan), former Pakistani diplomat
- Shashi Tharoor, Indian author, former under secretary general at the UN; former union minister of State for External Affairs and Union minister of State for Human Resource Development of India; chairman of Committee on External Affairs of India; member of Indian Parliament
- Nasim Zehra, F89, Pakistani journalist and writer, hosts a primetime current affairs talk show on Channel 24

== Military ==
- Erin Conaton, F95, U.S. under secretary of the Air Force
- Stephen L. Davis, brigadier general, U.S. Air Force
- Joseph F. Dunford, Jr., chairman of the Joint Chiefs of Staff
- Evelyn Farkas, F99, U.S. deputy assistant secretary of defense for Russia/Ukraine/Eurasia for the United States Department of Defense
- Susan Livingstone, F73, former undersecretary of the Navy
- Richard W. Mies, former commander in chief of the United States Strategic Command
- Frank Craig Pandolfe, vice admiral of the U.S. Navy
- James G. Stavridis, F84, dean of the Fletcher School; former commander of U.S. European Command, and NATO's Supreme Allied Commander Europe
- Patrick M. Walsh, F93, U.S. Navy admiral, vice chief of Naval Operations
- Lui Tuck Yew, F94, Singapore's former minister for Transport, minister for Information, Communications and Arts, and chief of Navy

== Private sector ==
- Justin Chinyanta, investment banker
- Jim Manzi, F79, founder and former CEO of Lotus
- Kingsley Moghalu, F92, founder and chief executive officer of Sogato Strategies S.A.
- Neil Smit, F88, president of Comcast Cable; former president and CEO of Charter Communications
- Dimitris Tziotis, F95, president and CEO of Cleverbank, an award-winning strategy consultancy
- David Welch, F77, regional president of Europe/Africa/Middle East/South West Asia for Bechtel and former assistant secretary of state for Near Eastern Affairs
- Walter Wriston, F42, former chairman and CEO of Citicorp
