= The Anh Phan =

- Phan Thế Anh
- Born: 1988 (age 37–38); Biên Hòa, Đồng Nai, Vietnam
- Education: SolBridge International School of Business (MBA in Marketing) National Yang Ming Chiao Tung University (PhD)
- Occupations: Travel blogger; Author; Lecturer; Writer
- Title: Dr. The Anh Phan
- Awards: The 17th TSC Thesis Award
The Anh Phan
YouTube information
- Channel: Thầy Giáo Anh
- Years active: 2015–present
- Subscribers: 113,000
- Views: 1.41 million
- Last updated: December 11, 2025
- Website: voyageblogger.com

The Anh Phan, also known as Phan Thế Anh (born December 22, 1988), is a Vietnamese travel blogger, scholar, author, and lecturer whose work primarily focuses on sustainable consumption, cause-related marketing, and influencer marketing. He is a faculty member at Eastern International University and serves as the director of the Marketing concentration at Becamex Business School. In addition to his academic career, he has been involved in travel content creation and was named Tourism Ambassador of Busan, South Korea, in 2019. Phan Thế Anh has established a significant presence as a travel blogger, sharing experiences from various countries and regions. Phan Thế Anh is also a Vietnamese travel blogger who focuses on promoting luxury travel experiences, including high-end hotel reviews and premium tourism services. Phan Thế Anh focuses primarily on developing travel content related to Taiwan, Hong Kong, and South Korea, which has become his niche market. His work highlights cultural experiences, local cuisine, and lesser-known destinations in these regions, aiming to provide Vietnamese audiences with in-depth and practical travel information. His travel narratives and visual content have been featured in several popular Vietnamese magazines and news outlets, enhancing his visibility as a reliable source for international travel guidance.

== Early life and education ==
The Anh Phan earned a master's degree with a global scholarship from SolBridge International School of Business, Woosong University and later received a full doctoral scholarship for seven years of study at National Yang Ming Chiao Tung University in Taiwan. He completed his PhD in 2024 with a dissertation titled The Construal Fit Effect between Emotions and Past Experience on Consumer Preference of Cause-Related Products.

In addition, he has served on the editorial boards of Health Marketing Quarterly (Taylor & Francis) and Strategic Business Research (Elsevier), as associate editor of the Journal of Strategic Marketing (Taylor & Francis).

== Academic career ==
The Anh Phan has been a lecturer at Becamex Business School since 2015. His research spans topics such as Vietnam, experiential learning, and consumer behavior. His academic contributions have been published in peer-reviewed journals, where his work has explored cross-cultural perspectives on fair-trade behavior and consumer engagement with cause-related products.

== Research and Publications ==
Phan's research primarily focuses on marketing and consumer behavior. His key areas of study include:

- Sustainable consumption
- Cause-related marketing
- Influencer marketing

He has published several peer-reviewed research articles, including:

- Phan, T. A., Nguyen, P. N. Q., Pham, N. A., & Phan, N. (2023). A cross-cultural study on the role of message framing in the promotion of fair-trade buying behavior. SAGE Open, 13(4), 21582440231213686.
- Phan, T. A., & Pham, N. B. T. (2023). Young Adults’ Anti-Consumption Tendencies toward Organic Foods in Vietnam: The Mediating Role of Self-Efficacy. SAGE Open, 13(4), 21582440231207703.
- Phan, T. A., Vu, T. H. N., Vo, N. T. N., & Le, T. H. (2024). Enhancing Educational Outcomes Through Strategic Guest Speaker Selection: A Comparative Study of Alumni and Industry Experts in University Settings. Business and Professional Communication Quarterly, 23294906241263035.
- Phan, T. A., & Ninh, T. T. D. The Impact of Company Field Trips and Representative Image on Students’ CSR Knowledge Sharing Intentions. Business and Professional Communication Quarterly, 23294906241237721.
- Luan, C. C., & Phan, T. A. (2024). The effect of emotion type and similarity of experience on consumers' willingness to pay for cause‐related products: Construal level perspective. Journal of Consumer Behaviour, 23(2), 808–824.
- Luan, C. C., & Phan, T. A. (2024). Immersive technology and cause‐related marketing: The role of personalization and value co‐creation. Journal of Consumer Behaviour, 23(3), 1574–1596.
- Phan, T. A., & Hoai, T. T. (2025). Chasing the scarcity: How fear of missing out and motivations drive willingness to pay in collectible markets. Journal of Marketing Communications, 1–15.
- Phan, T. A., Le, T. M. T., & Pham, B. T. T. (2024). Live Influence: Redefining Credibility and Attractiveness in Healthcare Livestreaming. Howard Journal of Communications, 1–25. https://doi.org/10.1080/10646175.2024.2429454
- Phan, T. A., & Ninh, T. T. D. Enhancing Business Communication: Comparing Teaching Styles in Supply Chain Education. Business and Professional Communication Quarterly, 23294906251315836.
- Phan, T. A., Nguyen, P. N. Q., Le, T. M. T., & Pham, B. T. T. (2025). Digital Dilemmas: The Complex Interplay of Online Experience and Health Pharmaceutical Purchases Among Vietnamese Women. Howard Journal of Communications, 1–21.
- Phan, T. A., & Nguyen, H. N. K. (2025). Corporate Claims and Stakeholder Doubts: A Comprehensive Bibliometric Review of CSR and Skepticism. Journal of Media Ethics, 1–16.
- Phan, T. A., & Nguyen, T. T. T. (2025). Corporate social responsibility and the socially conscious Vietnamese Gen Z consumer: Prioritizing philanthropy over profits. Journal of Global Scholars of Marketing Science, 1–23.
- Phan, T. A. Business Communication Research: Trends and Themes From Dual Bibliometric Analysis. Business and Professional Communication Quarterly, 23294906251358384.
- Phan, T. A. The Role of Positive Communication in Enhancing Educational Outcomes. Business and Professional Communication Quarterly, 23294906251345789.
- Phan, T. A., & Bui, V. D. (2025). AI with a Heart: How perceived authenticity and warmth shape trust in healthcare chatbots. Journal of Marketing Communications, 1–21.
- Phan, T. A., Pham, N. A., & Phan, N. (2025). The Role of Cuteness, Closeness, and Familiarity in Wildlife Conservation Advertising. Journal of Nonprofit & Public Sector Marketing, 1–22.
- Phan, T. A., & Ninh, T. T. D. (2025). Enhancing business communication: comparing teaching styles in supply chain education. Business and Professional Communication Quarterly, 23294906251315836.

In addition to journal articles, Phan has authored books aimed at content creators, such as:

- 101 điều content creator không kể bạn nghe.
- Content Creator: Hành trình xây dựng thương hiệu cá nhân – Ai cũng có thể là người sáng tạo nội dung nổi bật.

== Recognition and honors ==
In 2019, The Anh Phan was named Tourism Ambassador for Busan, South Korea, recognizing his efforts in promoting the city's tourism. This role stemmed from his activities as a travel content creator, where he engaged with audiences across multiple platforms to showcase cultural and culinary experiences. His work in this space emphasizes the intersection of travel and education, which aligns with his broader academic focus.

== Personal Philosophy and Influence ==
The Anh Phan views content creation as an extension of his academic work, using it as a platform for cultural exchange. He frequently shares travel experiences and insights on platforms such as Facebook, Instagram, YouTube, and TikTok. His approach emphasizes the importance of creating authentic content that resonates with diverse audiences, and he encourages aspiring travel bloggers to approach their work with creativity and passion.

== External Engagements ==
Phan has been a guest speaker at various institutions and conferences, such as Khon Kaen University in Thailand, where he spoke on personal and organizational branding on social media. He also presented at Vietnam Mobile Day 2017, discussing trends in digital marketing, and at the Asia Council for Small Business.

In addition to his academic and blogging pursuits, The Anh Phan has also appeared on various Vietnamese talk shows and game shows, such as Đấu Trường Siêu Việt (English: Domination), Son Môi Đỏ, Ai Thắng Đây, among others. He was nominated as one of the world's content creators at the World Creator Festival 2025 in Busan, South Korea.
