= Mützelburg =

Mützelburg is a German surname. Notable people with the surname include:

- Bernd Mützelburg (born 1944), German diplomat
- Rolf Mützelburg (1913–1942), German U-boat commander
