= One Campaign =

Non-profit organisation fighting extreme poverty and preventable disease

ONE Campaign
- Formation: May 16, 2004
- Type: Development advocacy
- Headquarters: Washington, D.C.
- Locations: United States; United Kingdom; France; Germany; Belgium; South Africa; Canada; Nigeria; Senegal
- Official language: English, French, German, Dutch
- CEO and President: Ndidi Okonkwo Nwuneli
- Key people: Bono (co-founder); Bobby Shriver (co-founder), Jamie Drummond (co-founder)
- Website: one.org

ONE Campaign (styled as ONE) is an international, non-partisan, non-profit organization advocating for the investments needed to create economic opportunities and healthier lives in Africa. The campaigning organization uses data, grassroots activism, political engagement, and strategic partnerships to get political leaders to support policies and programs that save lives and improve futures.

ONE was founded in 2004 by Bobby Shriver, Jamie Drummond, and Bono along with a coalition of 11 non-profit humanitarian and advocacy organizations; including DATA, Care, World Vision, Oxfam America, and Bread for the World. Funding was provided by the Bill & Melinda Gates Foundation. In 2007, ONE announced it would be merging with DATA.

== Overview ==
ONE advocates for achievement of the Sustainable Development Goals and for policies benefiting those who live in conditions of extreme poverty around the globe. ONE supports a broad variety of international development issues, including the fight against treatable and preventable diseases like HIV/AIDS, malaria, and tuberculosis; access to clean water and expanded access to energy; lessening corruption and improving transparency standards and government accountability to citizens; making trade fairer; providing basic education for all; and increasing international affairs budgets.

Current members of ONE's board of directors include Tom Freston and Mimi Alemayehou.

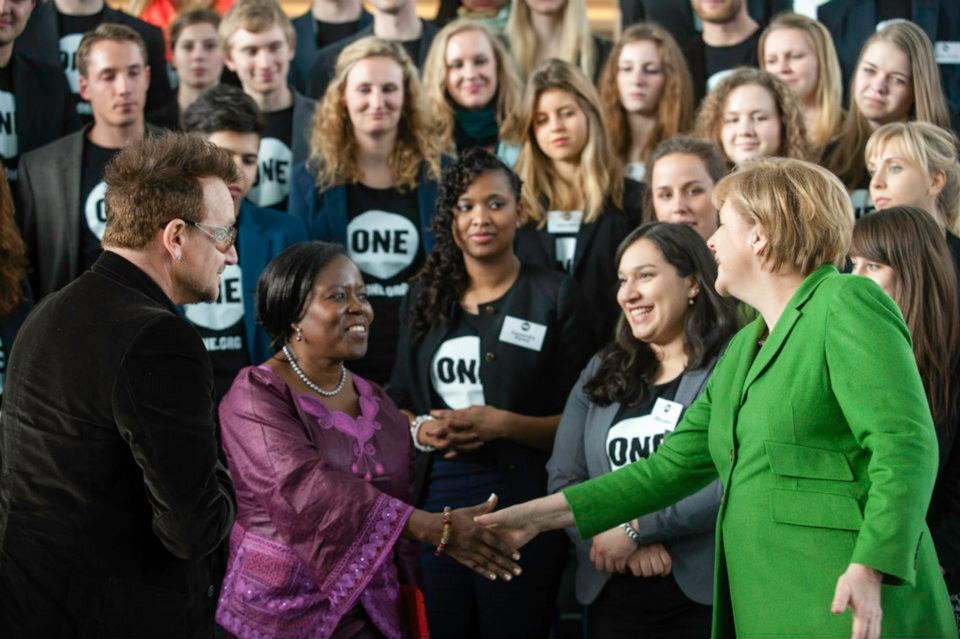
One Campaign

In addition to ONE's long-term relationship with the Bill & Melinda Gates Foundation, the campaign is funded through donations from partner organizations including Apple, Bank of America, Bloomberg L.P., Bloomberg Philanthropies, Cargill, the Caterpillar Foundation, Coca-Cola, Ford Foundation, Google, Merck, Roche, Rockefeller Foundation, Salesforce, Skoll Foundation, and Open Society Foundations.

== History ==
ONE was founded by Irish musician Bono and other activists, along with 11 organizations: Bread for the World, CARE, DATA, International Medical Corps, International Rescue Committee, Mercy Corps, Oxfam America, Plan USA, Save the Children U.S., World Concern, and World Vision.

The name ONE was inspired by the belief that one voice, coming together with many others—the political left and right, business leaders, activists, faith leaders and students—can change the world for the better.

=== 2004–2010 ===
The official ONE launch rally was held on May 16, 2004, at Liberty Mall in Philadelphia, United States. Approximately 2,000 people attended, including Bono, Dikembe Mutombo, Michael W. Smith, Richard Stearns (president of World Vision), and David Beckmann (president of Bread for the World).

In December 2004, ONE announced a $3 million grant from the Bill & Melinda Gates Foundation. Mark McKinnon, an adviser to United States President Bush, and Mike McCurry, an adviser to the presidential campaign of John Kerry, appeared on CNN's Inside Politics with Judy Woodruff in 2004 in support of ONE.

In 2008, ONE merged with DATA. The merged entity was run by CEO David J. Lane until his departure in early 2011 to join the Obama administration. Former editor of Time magazine, CEO Michael Elliott, led ONE from 2011 until early 2016, and was ONE's Senior Strategic Advisor until his passing in July 2016.

During the 2008 U.S. presidential election, the organization launched a campaign called ONE Vote '08. The campaign was co-chaired by former U.S. Senate majority leaders Tom Daschle (D-SD) and Bill Frist (R-TN). Since 2009, ONE has run a series of ONE Vote campaigns around national elections, including ONE VOTE 2010 in the United Kingdom, ONE Vote 2012 in both France, and ONE Vote 2012 and ONE Vote '16 in the United States.

In 2010, the Gates Foundation's Living Proof Project became part of ONE.

=== 2011–2014 ===
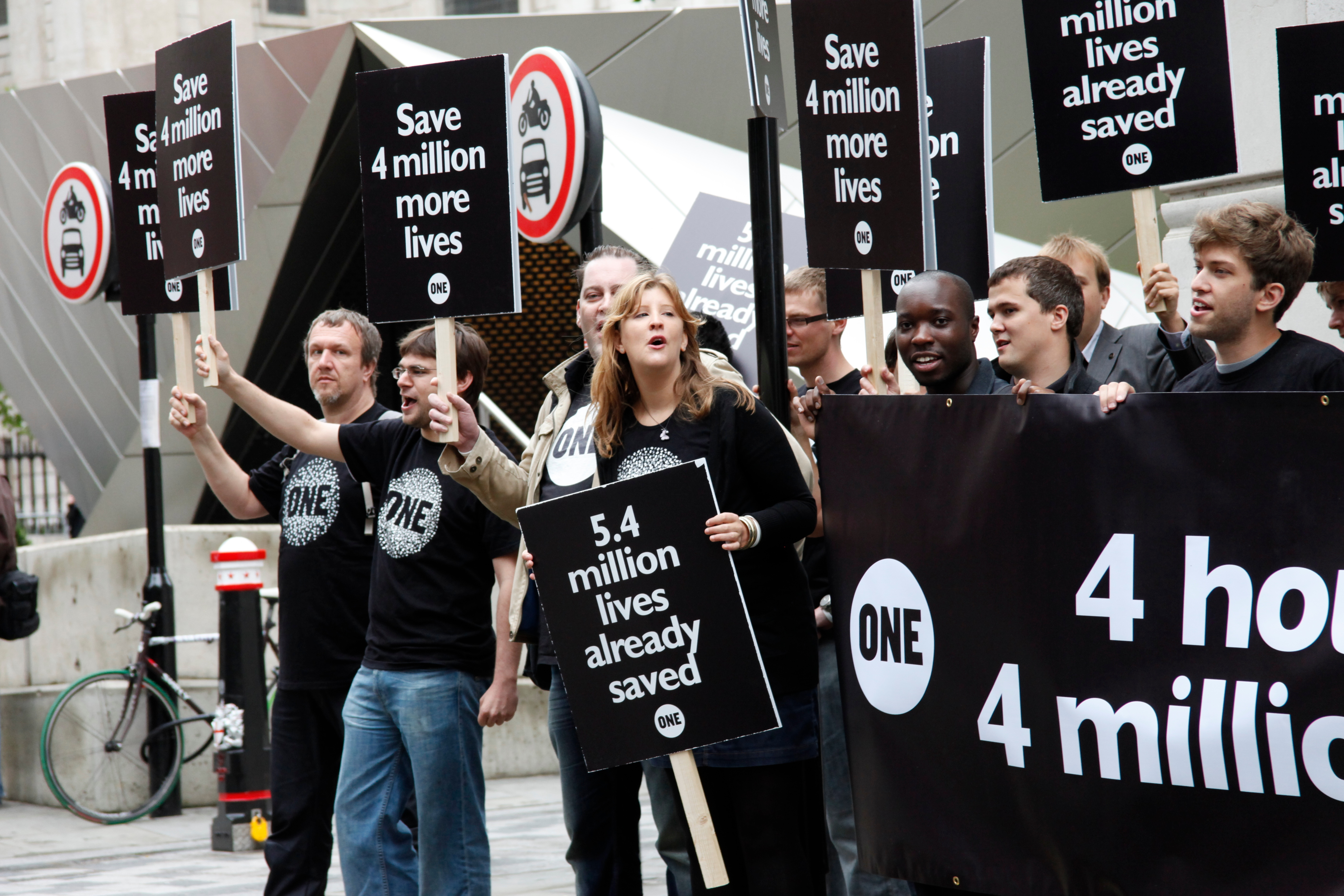
ONE protestors at a GAVI conference in 2011

ONE has a focus on ‘Factivism' (fact-based activism), as referenced in Bono's 2013 TED talk.

In 2014, ONE's "Trillion Dollar Scandal" report was released. It suggested that $1 trillion leaves developing countries each year through various forms of corrupt activity. Since the release of the report, more than 50,000 people have signed a petition asking world leaders to sign up to the "Fair Play Standard"—a set of measures that would help promote transparency and reduce money flowing outwards as a result of corrupt activity.

=== 2015–2020 ===
In 2015, ONE collected signatures for an open letter addressed to Angela Merkel and Nkosazana Dlamini-Zuma, urging them to focus on women as they serve as the head of the G7 in Germany and the AU in South Africa, respectively, in order to set the priorities in development funding before a main UN summit in September 2015 that would establish new development goals for the generation. The following people signed the open letter: Ali Hewson, Angelique Kidjo, Beyoncé, Charlize Theron, Christy Turlington, Danai Gurira, Helene Gayle, Lady Gaga, Lauren Bush, Mabel van Oranje, Dr. Maria Furtwangler, Meryl Streep, Michele Sullivan (president of the Caterpillar Foundation, director of Corporate Social Innovation), Naisula Lesuuda (senator, Kenya), Rita Wilson, Rosamund Pike, Sarah Silverman, Sheryl Sandberg, and Yvonne Chaka Chaka.

In March 2015, ONE launched a report titled "Poverty is Sexist", which details the ways in which women and girls are most seriously affected by poverty. The promotion of this report included the release of the song and accompanying video "Strong Girl" which featured leading female musicians from seven African countries including Kenya's Victoria Kimani, South Africa's Judith Sephuma and Mozambique's Gambela, alongside Nigerian actress Omotola Jalade Ekeinde. It was nominated for "Best African Collaboration" in the All Africa Music Awards.

The "Poverty is Sexist" campaign also encouraged women around the world to pose for a '#Strengthie'—a selfie in the pose of Rosie the Riveter, face of the famous "We Can Do It!" poster—and post it online in support of girls and women. Teenage activist and ONE campaign associate Malala Yousafzai posted a #strengthie from the Malala Campaign Twitter to show her support.

On World AIDS Day, December 1, 2015, ONE and RED hosted a night of music at Carnegie Hall in New York to celebrate the 15 million people on life-saving anti-retroviral drugs compared to 700,000 in 2000, and to encourage the world to keep its focus on eradicating HIV/AIDS and other preventable diseases by 2030 as one of the Sustainable Development Goals. The event, which also marked ONE's 10 year anniversary, was hosted by The Daily Show's Trevor Noah and featured performances from Miley Cyrus, Hozier, Jessie J, Bono and The Edge.

During 2015, ONE worked with partners at Action/2015 and Project Everyone to promote the new Global Goals for Sustainable Development around the world so citizens can hold leaders to account in delivering them by 2030.

On International Women's Day 2016, ONE relaunched their Poverty is Sexist campaign, featuring an updated report including new figures, such as the fact that in 2016 half a billion women still cannot read and that girls account for 74% of all new HIV infections among adolescents across Africa. It also lists the 20 worst countries to be a girl, based on a number of factors including the number of years a girl attends school, the proportion of women who have a paid job relative to men and the likelihood of a woman dying during childbirth. On International Women's Day 2017, ONE released a report that stated 130 million girls are currently out of school. It claims the number of girls missing out on receiving an education amounts to a crisis that must be urgently addressed.

The campaign involved an open letter signed by several high-profile celebrity activists; including Meryl Streep, Oprah Winfrey, Amy Poehler, Tina Fey, Elton John, Colin Farrell, Mary J. Blige and Shonda Rhimes. The letter was addressed to world leaders, asking them to put women and girls at the top of the development agenda in order to eradicate extreme poverty by 2030 as per the Sustainable Development Goals. It also asks for better data on females across the globe, to make sure the world can track the improvements being delivered to them.

In March 2017, Gayle Smith was named president and CEO of the ONE Campaign.

In May 2020, ONE launched #PassTheMic, an innovative social media campaign that saw high-profile talent and influencers hand over their platforms to global health experts and frontline workers to share the facts and highlight the need for a coordinated global response to the pandemic. 42 celebrity activists, including Julia Roberts, Danai Gurira, Millie Bobby Brown, Zachary Quinto, Hugh Jackman, Penelope Cruz, Sarah Jessica Parker, passed their platforms to 43 experts, including Dr. Anthony Fauci, Dr. Ngozi Okonjo-Iweala, David Anderson, Dr. Larry Brilliant. The campaign received widespread media coverage and was a finalist for PRWeek’s Purpose Award and shortlisted for a Cannes Lion Award.

Further, ONE Campaign together with the Nelson Mandela Foundation and MTV Base, launched “Stand Together” a rallying call to all Africans to unite against COVID-19. The song was released on all digital platforms and was met international acclaim, it featured artists from seven African countries, including 2Baba, Ben Pol, Teni, Yemi Alade, Amanda Black, Stanley Enow, Gigi lamayne, Prodigio, Betty G and Ahmed Soultan.

=== 2020–present ===
In 2021, the ONE Campaign continued to work against the spread of vaccine misinformation through the #MythOrVax campaign. In partnership with TikTok, UNICEF, the WHO’s Viral Fact Africa, and the African Union, they launched an online quiz and interactive filter. Featuring some of Africa’s biggest celebrities and health experts, the campaign aimed to counter myths and inaccurate information, address ongoing fears and concerns, and raise awareness about the importance of COVID-19 vaccinations. The organization also launched an animated series, titled Pandemica, in March 2021. Breaking through the complexities of vaccine equity and COVID-19 fatigue, the series called for government and pharmaceutical companies to come together to fight COVID-19. The animated stories were brought to life by a number of their celebrity activists Patrick Adams, Samuel Arnold, Bono, Connie Britton, Penélope Cruz, Meg Donnelly, Danai Gurira, Nick Kroll, Laura Marano, Kumail Nanjiani, David Oyelowo, Phoebe Robinson, Michael Sheen, Wanda Sykes, and Calum Worthy. Pandemica gained recognition for its impact, including at the 2022 Anthem Awards, winning Gold for Health and Best Strategy, as well as Silver for Campaign for Nonprofit.

In 2022, the ONE Campaign launched data.one.org which compiles the latest data and analysis on the economic, political, and social changes impacting Africa. The organization uses the platform to shape debates and influence policy. From food security to debt and gender inequality, data.one.org helps users get smarter on Africa in a volatile world.

In 2023, the ONE Campaign and Google formed a new data partnership, focused on making it easier to find credible data on economic, political, and social issues throughout Africa. ONE Data Commons combines data and research from data.one.org and hundreds of billions of data points on economics, climate, health, demographics and more from Google's Data Commons. Through the power of AI, ONE Data Commons aims to empower anyone, anywhere to access data, understand issues, increase the power of their voices, and collaborate to make change happen. As a part of this partnership, in November 2023, ONE Campaign released an analytical report, the Climate Finance Files, which revealed that $343 billion in climate finance commitments between 2013 and 2021 were either not delivered or had little to do with climate (including money allocated for coal-fired power plants, natural gas facilities, chocolate shops, hotels, and police).

In April 2024, Ndidi Okonkwo Nwuneli was named president and CEO of the ONE Campaign.

== Methods ==
Archbishop Desmond Tutu speaking about ONE in a prerecorded video shown before a U2 performance of "One" during the group's U2 360° Tour in 2009

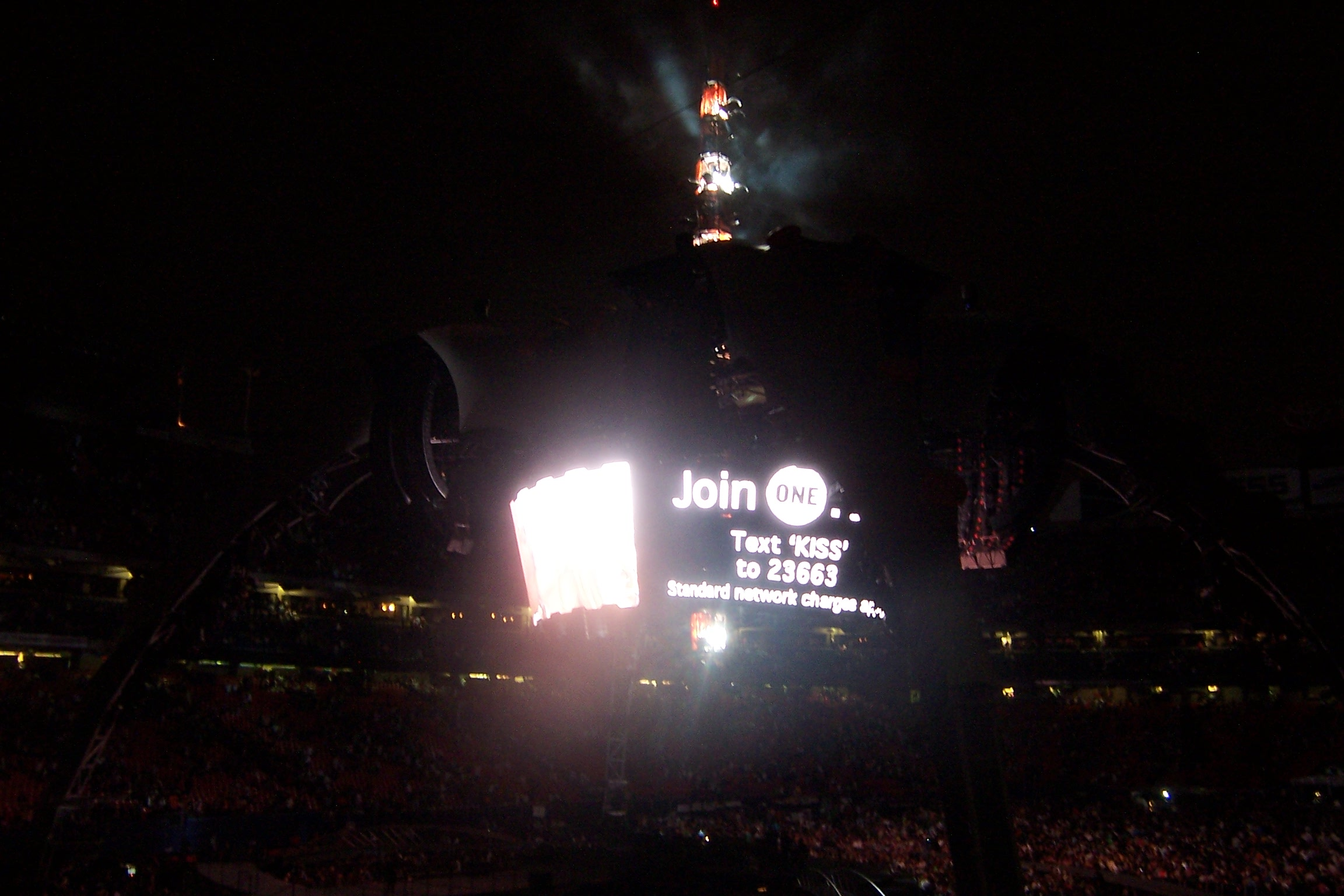
An invitation to join ONE, shown at the end of the same show

ONE uses a number of highly visible methods to reach out to the general public, promote its message, and encourage advocacy actions. ONE does not ask for public donations, stating: "We're not asking for your money. We're asking for your voice."

ONE works with volunteer campaigners in different markets to raise awareness and lobby governments to fight extreme poverty and preventable disease. ONE Youth Ambassadors are selected yearly from Ireland, the UK, France, Germany, the Netherlands, and Italy to support its grassroots mobilization and advocacy goals across Europe. ONE Champions work to advance ONE's goals in Africa through lobby meetings, campaigning, and awareness raising. In the United States and Canada, ONE field organizers coordinate campaigning efforts, lobby members of Congress and Parliament, and host community awareness events. On college campuses across the U.S., ONE Campus chapters are run by students who mobilize their peers to participate in ONE's advocacy campaigns. ONE Campus chapters aim to teach students about extreme poverty and encourages members to campaign for lifesaving investments and US development policies.

== Legislation ==
In the United States, ONE announced its support for the Electrify Africa Act of 2013 (H.R. 2548; 113th Congress), a bill that would direct the President to establish a multiyear strategy to assist countries in sub-Saharan Africa develop an appropriate mix of power solutions to provide sufficient electricity access to people living in rural and urban areas in order to alleviate poverty and drive economic growth. ONE Campaign said that "this legislation is a bold vision for U.S. engagement in the energy sector in Africa."

On February 8, 2016, the Electrify Africa Act was signed into law by President Obama. ONE Campaign members helped achieve this result by hosting events, signing and delivering petitions (360,000 names collected and delivered across all US states) and tweeting their support to politicians. Senator Chris Coons thanked ONE members for their support in helping raise the profile of the bill.

ONE has worked with Publish What You Pay and a coalition of other non-government organisations around the Cardin-Lugar Amendment and the passing of extractives transparency laws in the United States and Europe.

In 2014, over 22,000 UK-based ONE members wrote to their MPs in support of investing 0.7% of gross national income to international aid. In June, Liberal Democrat MP Michael Moore used his Private Member's Bill to enshrine the law, making the UK the first G7 country to meet the UN spending target.

== Controversy ==
ONE has been criticized for its response to a book by African economist Dambisa Moyo, Dead Aid: Why Aid Is Not Working and How There Is a Better Way for Africa, which was published in January 2009. Moyo accused ONE of mischaracterizing her views. She says that she is against only government aid, not "their kind of aid". In June 2009, Moyo told former U.S. presidential Republican speech writer Peter Robinson during a Hoover Institute sponsored Uncommon Knowledge interview that "the harshest thing that has happened [in terms of responses to her 2009 book Dead Aid], Bono's and Bob Geldof's organization, called ONE, who I had tried to have a number of meetings with before the book came out, about what the theses of the book were, launched a very vitriolic attack against me. To the point that they were calling organizations ahead of my meetings and media appointments and sent a letter to African NGOs claiming, basically, painting me as a genocidal maniac trying to kill African babies. In other words, trying to get Africans to be against me. To me, that was not really fostering dialogue."
