= KCMS (disambiguation) =

KCMS may refer to:

- KCMS, a radio station (105.3 FM) licensed to Edmonds, Washington, United States
- King's College Music Society, of King's College, Cambridge
- Kent County Medical Society, Michigan, United States
- Kalamazoo Center for Medical Studies, Kalamazoo, Michigan, United States
