= John Edgar Endicott =

American academic, born 1936

U.S. Air Force Senior Executive Service Georgia Tech Woosong University

Personal details
- Born: August 9, 1936 Cincinnati, Ohio, U.S.
- Died: June 22, 2024 (aged 87)
- Spouse: Mitsuyo Kobayashi
- Children: Charlene Noble and John
- Parent: Charles Lafayette Endicott (father)
- Education: University of Omaha
- Alma mater: Tufts University
- Occupation: military personnel; professor; president; writer; educator
- Known for: Limited Nuclear Weapons-Free Zone in Northeast Asia (LNWFZ-NEA); Japan's Nuclear Option
- Awards: Defense Superior Service Medal. Legion of Merit Medal. Bronze Star. The Meritorious Service Medal. Air Medal with one oak leaf cluster. Department of the Army Civilian Achievement Medal. Outstanding Professor of Year Award, ANAK Society. Honorary Doctorate from the University of Toulouse. Honorary Doctorate in Political Science from Dankook University. Marquis Who's Who Lifetime Achievement Award.

John Edgar Endicott (August 9, 1936 – June 22, 2024) served as vice chancellor of the SolBridge International School of Business and President of Woosong University. Previously, he served as a professor at the Sam Nunn School of International Affairs at Georgia Tech and director of the school's Center for International Strategy, Technology and Policy. Endicott has written or co-written five books on foreign policy and security issues and one volume of memoirs.

== Biography ==
=== Early life and education ===
Endicott was born in Cincinnati, Ohio on August 9, 1936. He attended Carson Elementary School and Western Hills High School for all years of his secondary schooling except the academic year 1950-1951 when he attended Paddington Technical School in London, England. Returning to the U.S., he completed high school in 1954 and was admitted to the Ohio State University where he earned a B.A.(cum laude) in political science—graduating in March 1958, and was elected to the academic honor society, Phi Beta Kappa. Upon graduation he was commissioned a 2nd. Lt. in the U.S. Air Force and entered active service in May of that year. He continued his studies during his career, receiving an M.A. in European History from the University of Omaha in 1968, followed by M.A. degrees in International Relations and Law and Diplomacy in 1973 and a Ph.D. in International Relations in 1974, all from The Fletcher School of Law and Diplomacy, Tufts University, in cooperation with Harvard.

=== Career ===
After 31 years in government service, 28 in the Air Force and three as a senior civilian in the Senior Executive Service as an SES-4, he joined the Faculty of the Georgia Institute of Technology as a full professor in The Sam Nunn School of International Affairs. In 2008 he was awarded the title, professor emeritus after action of the Georgia Tech Faculty. During his military career he served as the Deputy Air Force Representative to the Military Staff Committee of the United Nations, was associate dean of the National War College, and director of the Institute for National Strategic Studies of Washington, D.C. Endicott started at Georgia Tech in 1989, founding the Center for International Strategy, Technology and Policy and was among the first members of the Sam Nunn School of International Affairs, also of Georgia Tech. In 1991 he first proposed a concept that became known as the Limited Nuclear Weapons-Free Zone for Northeast Asia (LNWFZ-NEA). While still not realized, research and dialog continues on this concept through an organization of retired generals, admirals, academics and peace activists. Endicott heads the Interim Secretariat for that body and the 12th plenary meeting was held in Daejeon, South Korea in October 2008. Participants attended from China, Japan, South Korea, Mongolia, Russia and the United States. Observers from Argentina, Finland and France also attended. In October 2010 the 13th Plenary was held in Toulouse, France. In August 2007, Endicott retired from Georgia Tech and became the co-president of Woosong University and vice chancellor of the SolBridge International School of Business, an all-English college, one of the seven colleges of Woosong University. In January 2009, Endicott became the president of Woosong University and continues in that post; in 2017 the Endicott College of International Studies was opened honoring his leadership contributions to Woosong University.

On 8 October 2010, Endicott was awarded an honorary doctorate from the University of Toulouse, Toulouse, France, in a ceremony held at that university which dates to 1229. The doctorate was awarded to mark the many years dedicated to the development of a cooperative security system for Northeast Asia, especially the concept for the Limited Nuclear Weapons-Free Zone for Northeast Asia (LNWFZ-NEA) which was first introduced in 1991. On 21 February 2019, Dankook University of Yongin, South Korea, awarded Endicott an honorary doctorate in political science for "his contributions to the enhancement of world peace through the movement for Limited Nuclear Weapons-Free Zone in Northeast Asia."

=== Marriage and children ===
Endicott was married to the former Mitsuyo Kobayashi; they had two children, Charlene Noble and John and four grand children. They celebrated their 60th wedding anniversary in August 2019.

== Published works ==
Endicott published five books on American and Asian security and foreign policy including Japan's Nuclear Option, and one book of his memoirs of Destined to Serve.

- Japan's Nuclear Option: Political, Technical, and Strategic Factors, Praeger special studies in international politics and government, Frederick A. Praeger Publishers, 1975, ISBN 978-0-275-05320-8, OCLC 1150114206
- Stafford, Roy W. (1977), American Defense Policy (4th ed.), Johns Hopkins University Press, ISBN 978-0-8018-1961-2
- Heaton, William R. (1978), The Politics Of East Asia: China, Japan, Korea, Westview Press, ISBN 978-0-8915-8127-7
- Garrity, Patrick J.; Goetze, Richard B. (1991), Regional Security Issues (Microform), NDU strategic studies course, Washington DC: National Defense University
- Papp, Daniel S.; Johnson, Loch K. (2004), American Foreign Policy: History, Politics, and Policy (1st ed.), Pearson Longman, ISBN 978-0-321-07902-2
- Miller, Jeffrey, ed. (2019-11-30), Destined to Serve: From the Queen City to Daejeon and the Presidency of a Korean University, Amazon, ISBN 978-1713359425

== Awards ==
Endicott holds the military decorations for his 31-year service as follows:

- Defense Superior Service Medal
- Legion of Merit Medal
- Bronze Star
- The Meritorious Service Medal
- Air Medal with one oak leaf cluster
- Department of the Army Civilian Achievement Medal - awarded on 1989.
- Outstanding Professor of Year Award, ANAK Society - awarded on 1997.
- Honorary Doctorate from the University of Toulouse, France - awarded on 8 October 2010.
- Honorary Doctorate in Political Science from Dankook University, Republic of Korea - awarded on 21 February 2019.
- Marquis Who's Who Lifetime Achievement Award, October 2019.
