= Hồng Bàng (disambiguation) =

Hồng Bàng refers to the Hồng Bàng dynasty, ruling Vietnam from 2879 to 258 BC.

Hồng Bàng may also refer to:

- Hồng Bàng District, of Hai Phong, Vietnam.
- Hồng Bàng University, a private university in Ho Chi Minh City, Vietnam.
