= Hong Bang International University =

University in Ho Chi Minh City, Vietnam

- Đại học Quốc tế Hồng Bàng
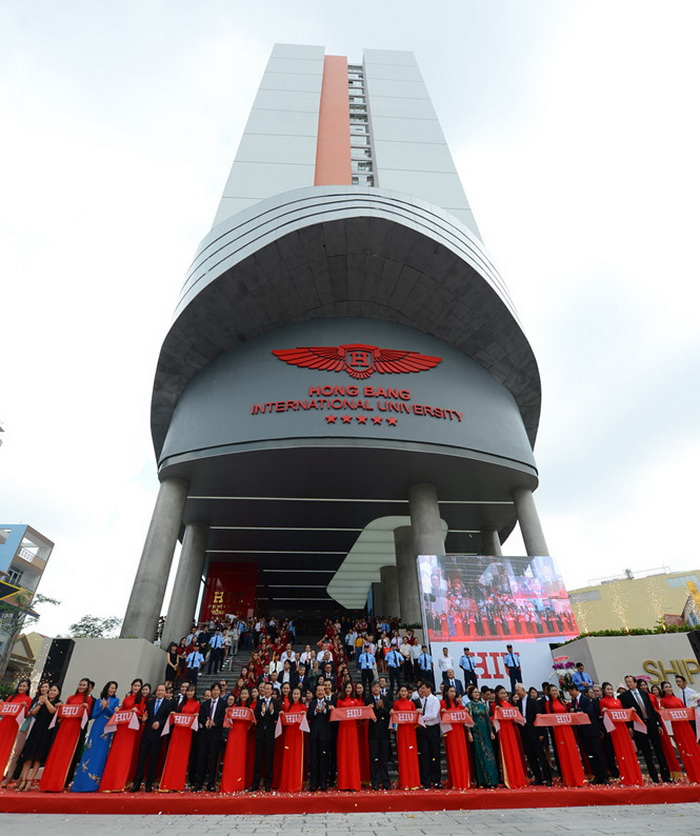
- Type: Private
- Established: July 11, 1997; 29 years ago
- Affiliations: Nguyen Hoang Group
- Chancellor: Phạm Văn Lình
- Location: 215 Điện Biên Phủ, Bình Thạnh district, Ho Chi Minh City, Vietnam
- Website: hiu.vn
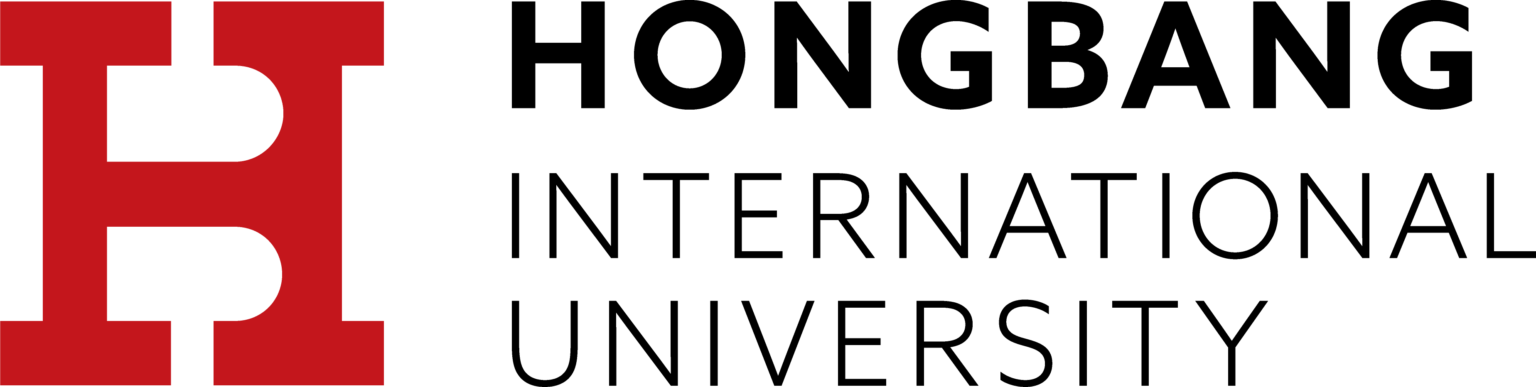

Hong Bang International University (HIU) is a private university in Ho Chi Minh City.

HIU has faculties of law, economics, fine arts, foreign languages. The university has been accredited by three US educational organizations as meeting American education standard.

HIU have 2 facilities

- Main facility (named Ship of Knowledge): 215 Điện Biên Phủ, 15 ward, Bình Thạnh district, Ho Chi Minh city
- Second facility: 120 Hòa Bình, Hòa Thạnh ward, Tân Phú district, Ho Chi Minh city

== History ==
Established in 1997, HIU became a member of NHG Education System in May 2015.

== Notable alumni ==
The Anh Phan, Travel Influencer

== Programs ==
HIU offers degree programs in forty disciplines, enrolling an average of 4,000 undergraduate and post-graduate students from Southern Vietnam. Up to 2017, HIU had more than 66.000 alumni working in Vietnam and APAC. HIU's strong point is its training in medical fields.

HIU has received the Labor Order, third class by the President; Merit by the Prime Minister as well as Merit by Central of the Ho chi Minh City Communist Youth Union.

According to UniRank, HIU is ranked 38th in Vietnam. Recently, following the assessment of The Ministry of Education and Training, the university is on the strongly recommended list because of high-level education, international environment and a high quality campus.

== Admission ==
Vietnamese students come from mainly Ho chi minh City, Tay Ninh, Vinh Long, Can Tho, Long An, and Binh Thuan.
HIU has international students from Cuba, Cambodia, Korea, Mongolia, Japan, and Italy . They join both the undergraduate and graduate levels.

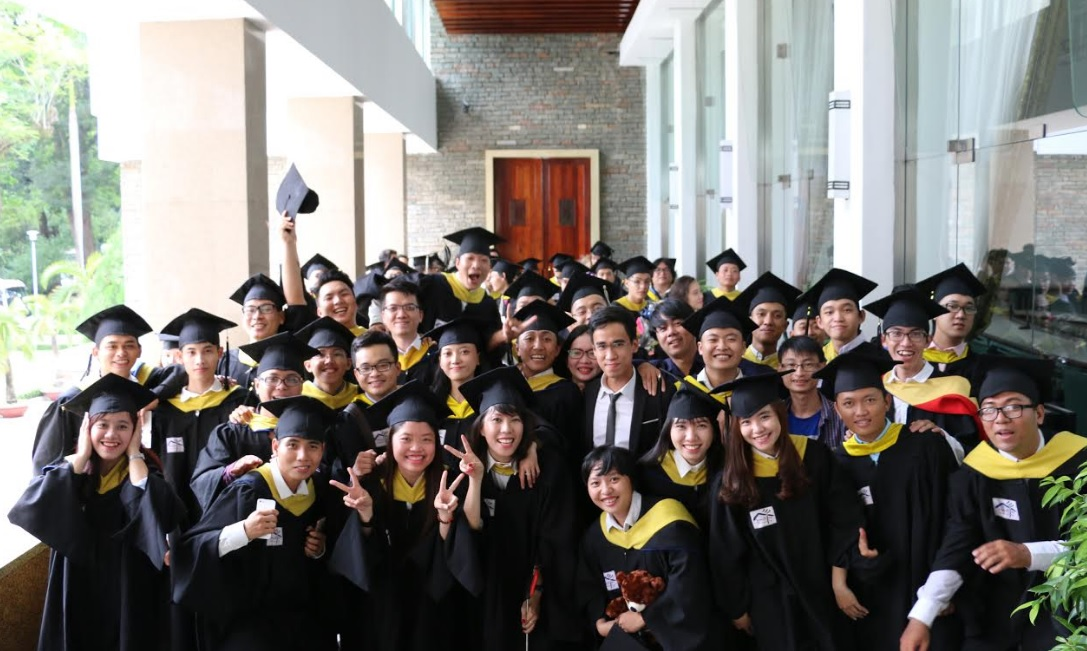
HIU students

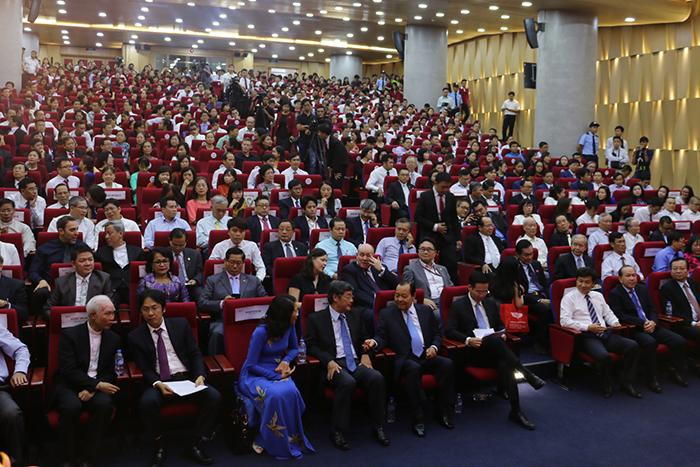
HIU Premium Ball Room

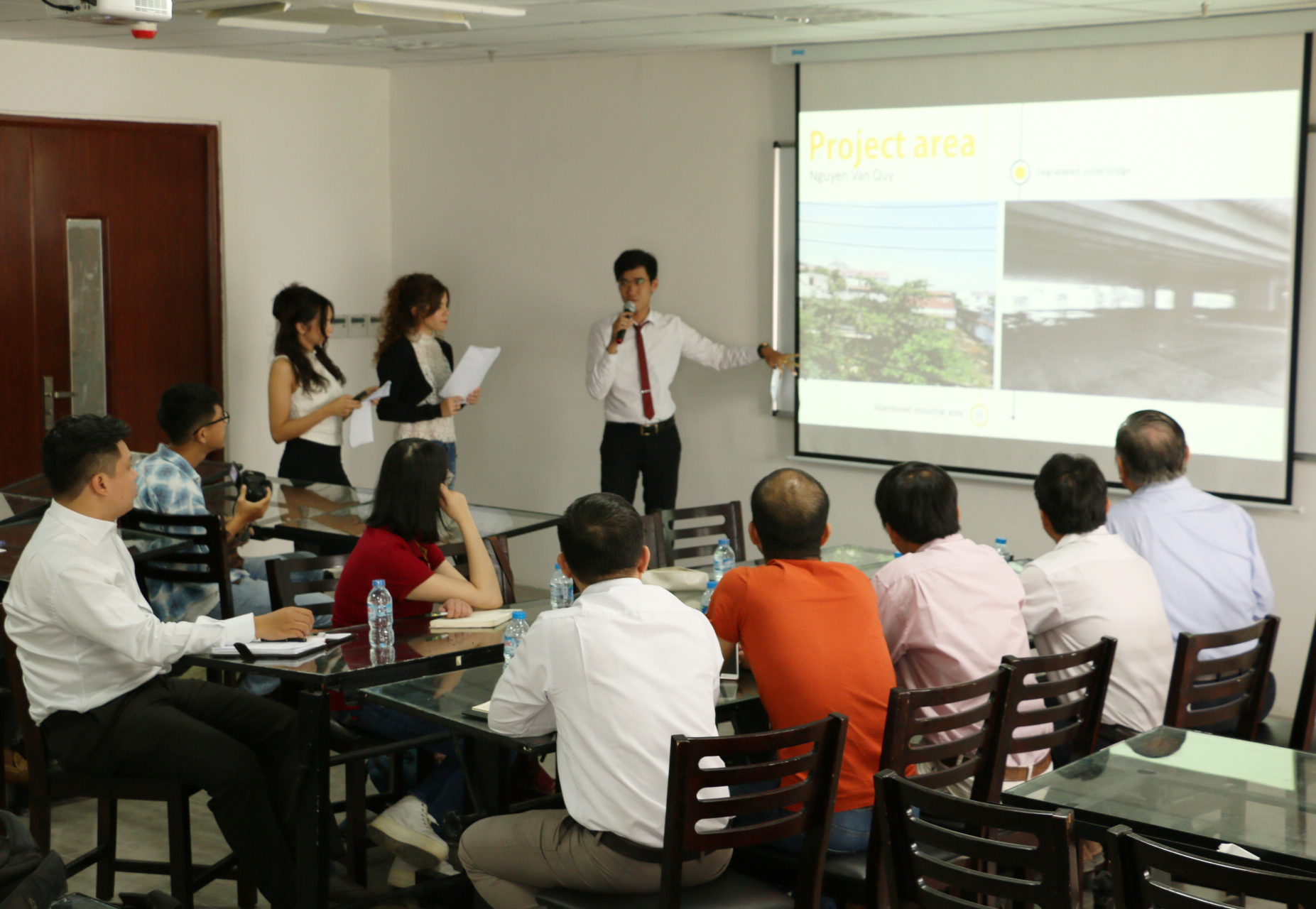
International students study at HIU

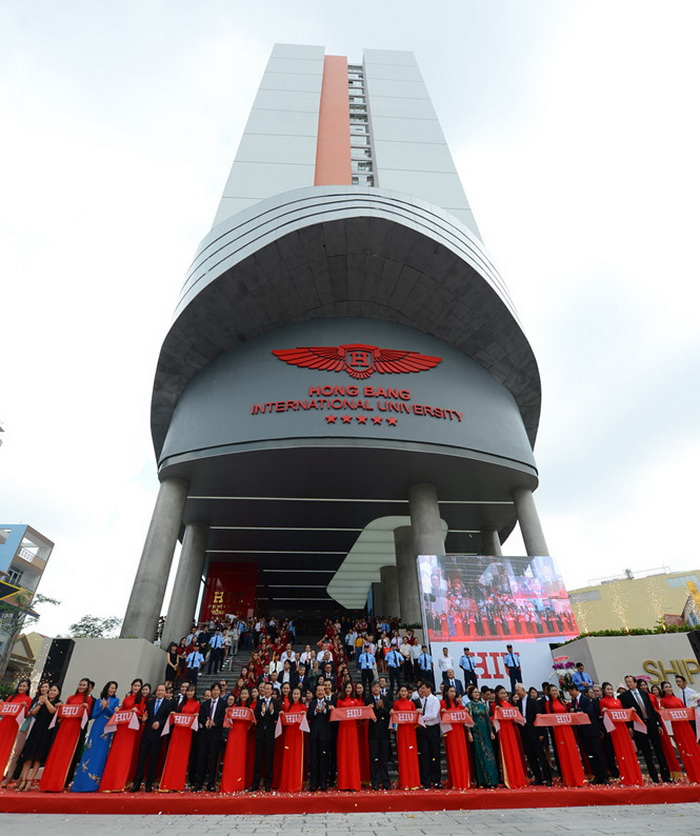
HIU Escalator of Fame

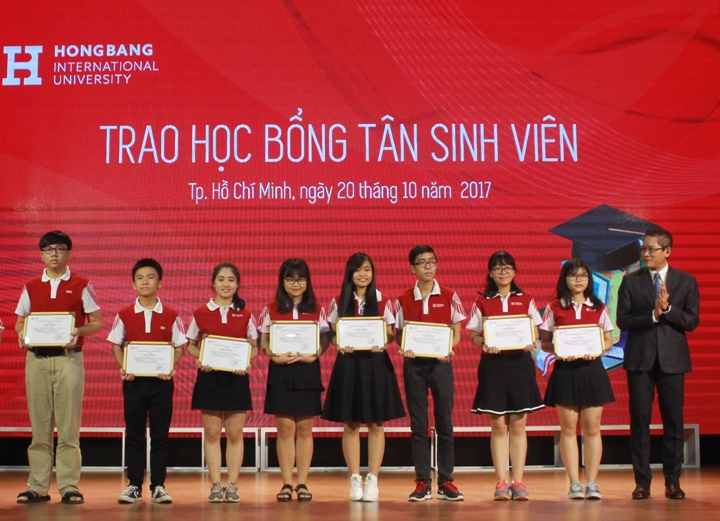
NHG Deputy CEO delivered scholarship to the talents
