= World Concern =

Christian global relief and development organization

- Founded: 1955
- Founder: Dr. Wilbert Saunders and Jim McCoy
- Type: Non-governmental organization
- Location: Seattle, Washington, US
- Region served: 17 countries
- Key people: Kelli Tolf (President)
- Website: worldconcern.org

World Concern is a Christian global relief and development organization operating in Africa, Southeast Asia, and Haiti, with its headquarters located in Seattle, Washington, United States. World Concern serves approximately 6 million people worldwide and has a staff of 877, with 846 of those being international and 31 based at headquarters.

World Concern is part of CRISTA Ministries, a Christian non-profit organization that oversees five ministries, and a charter member of the Evangelical Council for Financial Accountability (ECFA).

World Concern is also a founding member of the ONE Campaign.

== History ==
Dr. Wilbert Saunders and pharmacist Jim McCoy founded an organization called Medicine for Missions in 1955 in Seattle, Washington. The two shared a concern that surplus medications being thrown away could be used to save lives in underdeveloped countries. They founded Medicines for Missions and began supplying medicines to clinics and hospitals overseas.

The organization was renamed World Concern in 1976 after expanding work to include emergency relief in response to famines, hurricanes and earthquakes. Art Beals, a former missionary and pastor, became World Concern's executive director in 1975, and remained in the position until 1984. He was an important figure in driving the early growth of World Concern. David Eller, the agency's past president, oversaw World Concern since 2007. Jacinta Tegman became president in October 2013. The current president of World Concern is Nick Archer.

== Activities ==
World Concern's programs focus on community development in some of the poorest countries in the world. Programs include disaster response, health services, education and vocational training, food security and water, child protection and microcredit.

World Concern has regional offices in Asia (Bangkok, Thailand) and Africa (Nairobi, Kenya), as well as field offices in each operational country, which include Haiti, Bangladesh, Laos, Myanmar, Sri Lanka, Thailand, Vietnam, Chad, Kenya, Somalia, and South Sudan. Each office is staffed by a country director and mostly nationals, with a few expatriates.

Projects are developed based on the specific needs of a country's poorest populations located in underdeveloped areas. In Chad, for example, World Concern works in camps for refugees from the Darfur region of Sudan and internally displaced Chadians. In partnership with organizations such as USAID, World Concern implements a "Cash for Work" program that employs people living in the camp to perform labor, such as building rock bunds to reduce erosion. Workers receive vouchers, which they can convert to cash to purchase food, clothing and other necessities.

World Concern has also responded to major disasters, including the 2010 Haiti earthquake.

Initially providing emergency supplies of food, water, tarps and medical supplies, the agency's work during the first year after the earthquake included employing Haitians to clear rubble, repairing damaged homes, building steel-framed transitional shelters, repairing churches, and giving out business grants. The organization distributed cholera prevention and treatment information and supplies after an outbreak of the disease hit the country in October, 2010.

World Concern's programs seek to implement sustainable ways to lift people out of poverty, with a goal of enabling members of the communities in which they work to support themselves. Examples of this include supporting rural schools and teachers, providing job skills for caregivers of AIDS orphans, establishing financial service associations or village banks, providing small business training and support, improved agricultural techniques, and water and sanitation projects.

== Funding ==
World Concern's work is funded by donations from individuals, foundations and by government grants. Government grants include funding from USAID and OFDA. Donations from individuals for the Haiti earthquake response totaled more than $2 million. Through its parent organization, CRISTA Ministries, World Concern received a rating of four stars by Charity Navigator, with 94% of donations going toward programs.
