= KWPZ =

Contemporary Christian music radio station in Lynden, Washington, United States

- Lynden, Washington; United States
- Broadcast area: Vancouver, British Columbia; Bellingham, Washington
- Frequency: 106.5 MHz (HD Radio)
- Branding: Praise 106-5

Programming
- Format: Christian adult contemporary
- Subchannels: HD3: KCIS simulcast

Ownership
- Owner: Crista Ministries
- Sister stations: KCIS, KCMS

History
- First air date: 1960
- Former call signs: KLYN-FM (1960–1981); KLYN (1981–1996)
- Call sign meaning: Variation of "Washington Praise"

Technical information
- Licensing authority: FCC
- Facility ID: 14506
- Class: C
- ERP: 68,000 watts
- HAAT: 711 meters (2,333 ft)
- Transmitter coordinates: 48°40′46.00″N 122°50′31.00″W

Links
- Public license information: Public file; LMS
- Webcast: Listen Live
- Website: www.praise1065.com

KWPZ (106.5 FM) is a commercial radio station broadcasting a Christian adult contemporary radio format, with an emphasis on praise and worship music. Some Christian talk and teaching shows are also heard and some programming is shared with sister station 105.3 KCMS in Seattle. Licensed to Lynden, Washington, United States, the station serves Northwest Washington and Southern British Columbia including Greater Vancouver, Victoria and the Fraser River Valley. The station is currently owned by Crista Ministries. BBM Canada lists the station in the Vancouver ratings.

KWPZ broadcasts in HD Radio.

== Programming ==
Programs broadcast on KWPZ include:

- Adventures in Odyssey
- Focus on the Family
- Insight for Living
- Back to the Bible
- Grace to You
- Turning Point
- Family Life Today
- Extreme Praise: "Praise for a New Generation"
- A New Beginning
- Paws & Tales
