= Crista Ministries =

Coordinates: 47°46′10″N 122°21′15″W

CRISTA (ChRISTianity in Action) is a family of ministries headquartered since 1948 in the Richmond Highlands neighborhood of Shoreline, Washington, just north of Seattle. Its campus is the former Firland Sanatorium campus. The company focuses in the areas of education, global relief & development, youth camps, senior care, and media.

== History ==
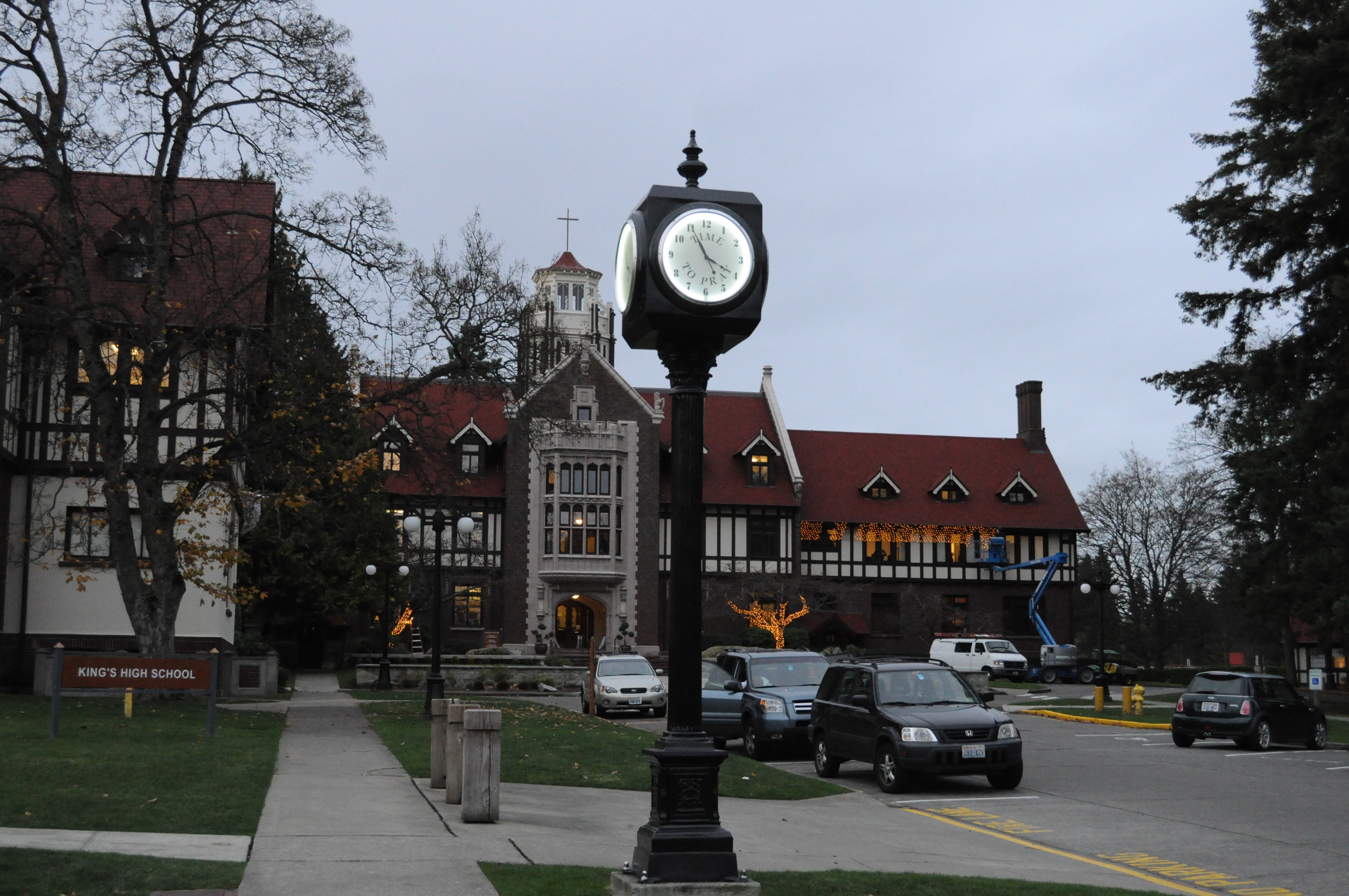
On the CRISTA campus. The clock in the foreground says "Time to Pray". The Mike Martin Administration Building is in the background and part of King's High School at left. Both buildings were designed by Daniel R. Huntington, and built 1913–1914 as part of the Firland Tuberculosis Hospital.

In 1949, Mike and Vivian Martin leased the abandoned Firland Tuberculosis Sanatorium from King County for one dollar per year, and founded a youth home and retirement community of about 80 elderly residents, naming the operation King's Garden. The youth home quickly became a school, graduating its first class in 1951. In the early 1950s, King's Garden expanded both its operations and geography with Miracle Ranch, a summer camp near Gig Harbor, and a radio station, KGDN. The organization later added a second summer camp, Island Lake, and expanded to four total radio stations.

In 1970, Medicine for Missions, an international relief organization, joined the organization and renamed itself World Concern. Christian Veterinary Mission joined King's Garden in 1978.

King's Garden became CRISTA in 1979 (an identity inspired by the concept of putting Christianity in action) and the school became King's Schools. In 1993, Seattle Street School, now Seattle Urban Academy, joined CRISTA Ministries. SUA closed in 2020.

In 2019, the new leader of CRISTA, Jacinta Tegman, implemented what was seen as an anti-gay mandate that required employees to disavow same-sex relationships, both at work and in their personal lives; several teachers quit as a result.

== Ministries ==
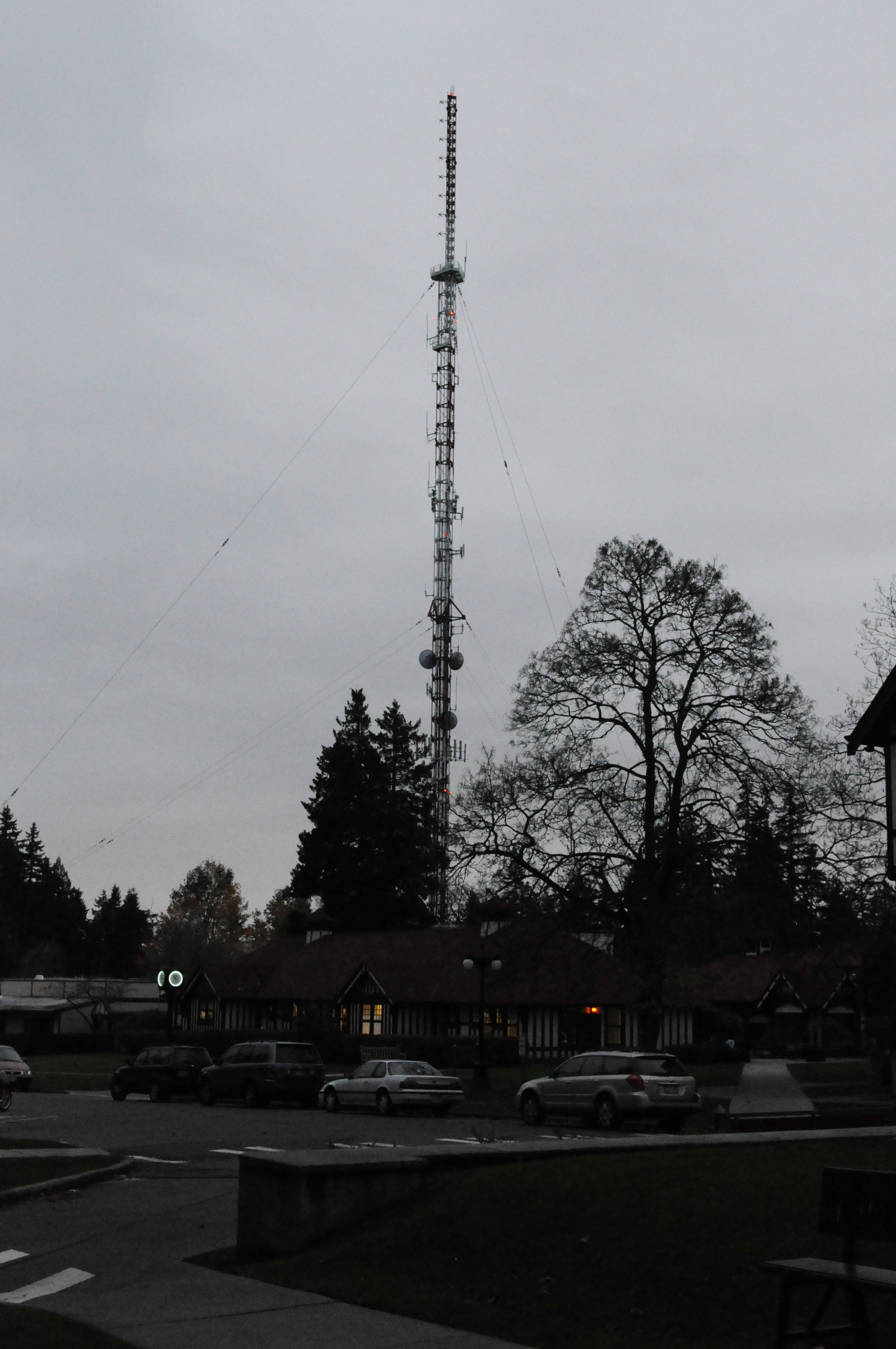

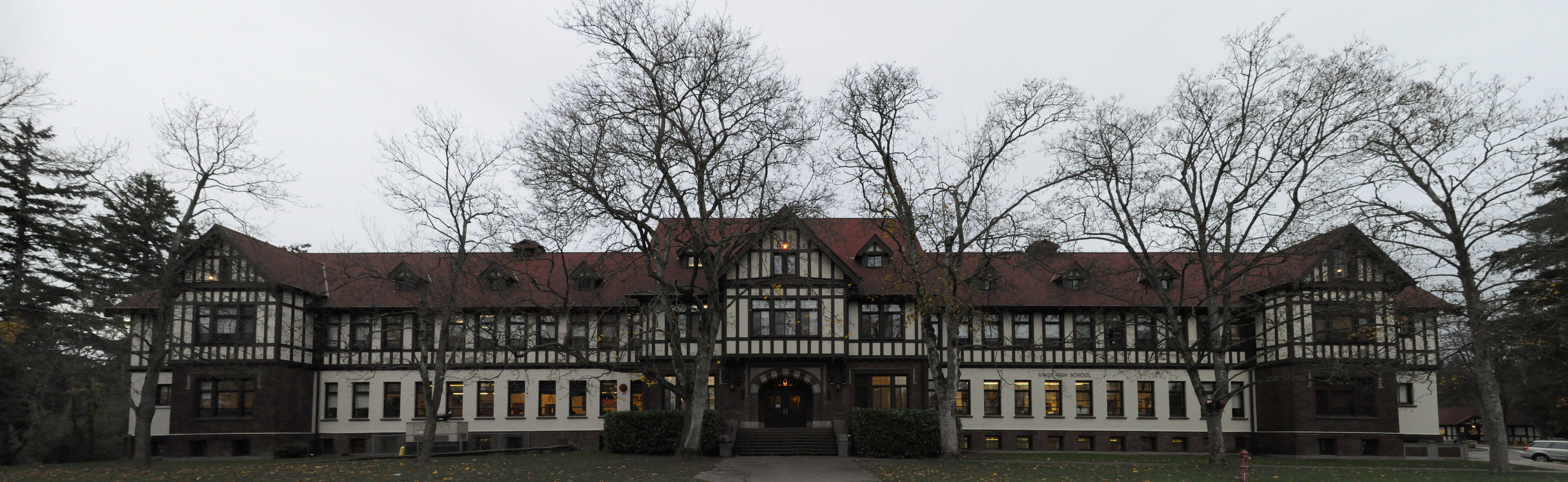
King's High School

CRISTA Ministries is a Christian ministry that focuses on evangelism through Christian education, media, senior care, and poverty alleviation. The organization is led by CEO Jacinta Tegman.

- CRISTA Senior Living
- King's Schools
  - King's Schools has been a part of the CRISTA family since 1949.
- CRISTA Media
  - CRISTA Media houses three Christian radio stations:
    - SPIRIT 105.3 FM KCMS, Seattle, Washington – Christian Contemporary Music
    - KCIS 630 AM, Seattle, Washington – Christian Talk
    - PRAISE 106.5 FM KWPZ, Lynden, Washington – Christian Contemporary Music
- World Concern is an international relief organization providing clean water, food, education and disaster assistance. Most of World Concern's staff overseas are natives of the country in which they are working. Most recently, World Concern had a strong presence in Haiti following the 2009 earthquake.
- CRISTA Camps operates one camp on the west side of Puget Sound. Miracle Ranch, located near Gig Harbor, is a western-themed camp with a horsemanship program.
