= KCIS =

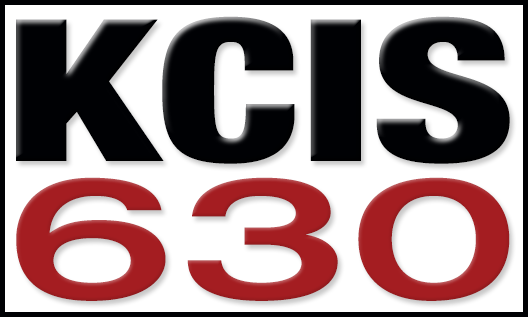
- Edmonds, Washington; United States
- Broadcast area: Seattle metropolitan area
- Frequency: 630 kHz
- Branding: KCIS 630

Programming
- Format: Christian radio

Ownership
- Owner: CRISTA Ministries
- Sister stations: KCMS, KWPZ

History
- First air date: 1954
- Former call signs: KGDN (1954–1985)
- Call sign meaning: "Christian Inspiration Station"

Technical information
- Licensing authority: FCC
- Facility ID: 14504
- Class: B
- Power: 5,000 watts (day); 2,500 watts (night)
- Transmitter coordinates: 47°46′6″N 122°21′7″W (day); 47°51′0″N 122°9′38″W (night)
- Repeaters: (105.3-2) KCMS-HD2 (Edmonds); 106.5 KWPZ-HD3 (Lynden)

Links
- Public license information: Public file; LMS
- Webcast: Listen live
- Website: kcisradio.com

KCIS (630 AM) is a radio station licensed to Edmonds, Washington, United States, and serving the Seattle metropolitan area. The station is owned by Crista Ministries and airs a Christian format. KCIS's daytime transmitter is co-located with the studios and offices, on Freemont Avenue North at Kings Garden Drive in Seattle, while the nighttime tower array is off Kaltenborn Road in Snohomish.

== History ==
In 1954, the station signed on as KGDN. It was originally a 1,000 watt daytimer station operating from King's Garden, the former name of Crista Ministries. The call sign referred to King's Garden.

In 1960, KGDN added an FM station at 105.3 MHz. At first it was simulcast with KGDN but later switched to separate religious programming and Christian music. Its first call sign was KGFM, later KBIQ and today KCMS, still co-owned with KCIS. In the 1970s, the power was boosted to 5,000 watts, but still as a daytime-only station.

In 1985, it switched to the current call letters KCIS. The station received Federal Communications Commission (FCC) permission for 24-hour broadcasting, with nighttime power at 2,500 watts, using a directional antenna from a site in Snohomish.
