= King's Schools =

Coordinates: 47°46′07″N 122°21′11″W

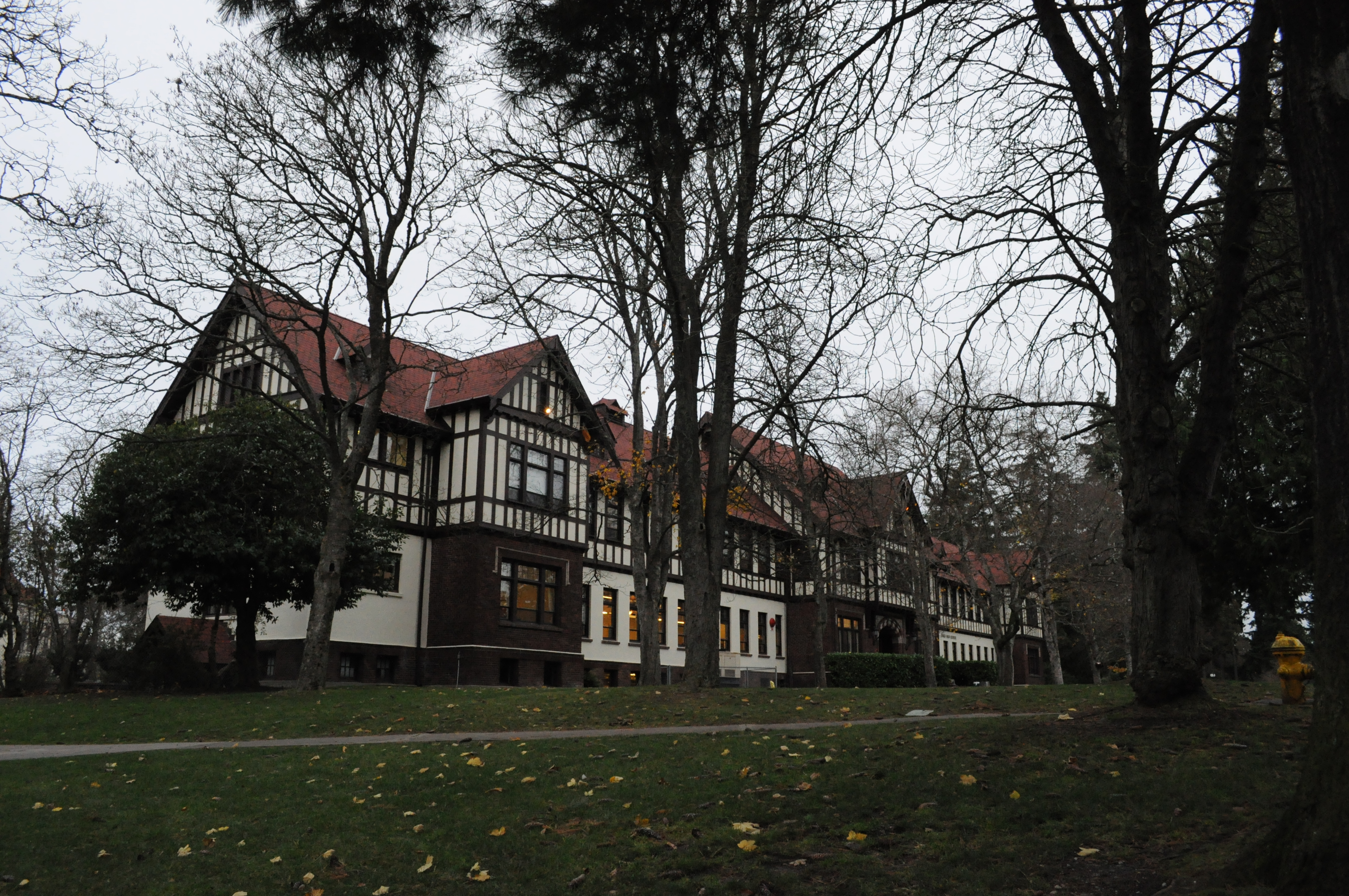
- Shoreline, WA; United States

Information
- Type: Private Christian
- Motto: Inspiring hearts and equipping minds to serve God for His glory.
- Religious affiliation: Christian
- Established: 1950
- Colors: Red and white
- Mascot: Knight
- Accreditation: Northwest Association of Accredited Schools
- Website: kingsschools.org

King's Schools is a private Christian school, serving preschool through 12th grade, located in Shoreline, Washington, United States. It is the largest single-campus Christian school in the state, and is part of the CRISTA family of ministries.

== History ==
King's was founded in 1950 by Mike and Vivian Martin.

== Academics and athletics ==
98% of King's High School graduates pursue higher education following graduation. The high school offers 11 concurrent college credit courses through a partnership with Northwest University.

In 2009, King's students took 97 AP examinations.

== Athletics ==
King's competes at the 1A classification level as part of the Washington Interscholastic Activities Association. King's has won 54 state championships and 39 academic state championships in basketball, cross country, golf, soccer, track & field and volleyball. Most recently, the Knights have won the 2023 girls' track state championship.

In 2005, Sports Illustrated named King's the top high school athletic program in Washington State.

The girls' cross country team has won seven state championships (2001-2003, 2006-2009).

Two-time LPGA tour winner Jimin Kang led the King's girls' golf team to the 1999 state title.

The school's cheer team won the 2024 USA Spirit Nationals competition.

== Controversy over anti-LGBTQ stance ==
In September 2019, it was revealed by the Seattle Times that King's Schools (and their parent organization Crista Ministries) had hardened their stance on acceptance of homosexuality at the school.

Some teachers believe this policy required them to disavow same-sex relationships, both on the job and in their personal lives. It further required that they teach that homosexuality is "a result of the failure to worship God," a belief that has little to no biblical support. Once notified of this policy, some teachers left the school. However, non-disclosure agreements prevented many of them from speaking about the issue and the impact on the school. Megan Troutman, an English teacher who left as a result of the new policy, noted that she "cannot, in good faith or conscience, teach in a place that creates policies that negatively impact an entire section of the student population... I could not be complicit in a policy that could harm or ostracize any student."

As a result of these actions, some families left the school because they did not support or did not want to fund an organization they perceived to be discriminatory. It was expected that many more teachers and families would follow suit, raising questions about the direction that doctrinal direction that King's School would take, with many concerned over extreme right-wing influences. Comments on social media and other platforms indicated an increasing divide between groups supporting King's anti-LGBTQ stance and those opposing it. Much of the blame for the new policy was attributed to Jacinta Tegman, the new CEO of Crista Ministries. Tegman was formerly the executive director of Sound the Alarm, which sought to use political action to repeal gay marriage as well as legal protections for LGBTQ citizens. Tegman's effort, Referendum 65, ultimately failed as she was unable to obtain enough signatures to place it on the ballot.

== Alumni ==
- Jimin Kang, LPGA golfer
- Corey Kispert (class of 2017), current basketball player for the Washington Wizards.
- Lars Helleren, professional soccer player for the Tacoma Defiance.
