= Business and Professional Communication Quarterly =

- Discipline: Management, communication
- Language: English
- Edited by: Melinda Knight

Publication details
- Former names: Business Communication Quarterly, Bulletin of the Association for Business Communication, ABCA Bulletin
- History: 1969-present
- Publisher: SAGE Publishing in association with the Association for Business Communication (United States)
- Frequency: Quarterly

Standard abbreviations
- ISO 4: Bus. Prof. Commun. Q.

Indexing
- ISSN: 2329-4906 (print); 2329-4922 (web)
- LCCN: 2013200406
- OCLC no.: 900655234

Links
- Journal homepage; Online access; Online archive

Business and Professional Communication Quarterly is a quarterly peer-reviewed academic journal covering communication management. The editor-in-chief is Melinda Knight (Montclair State University). It was established in 1969 as Business Communication Quarterly, obtaining its current title in 2014, and is published by SAGE Publishing in association with the Association for Business Communication.

== Abstracting and indexing ==
The journal is abstracted and indexed in:

- ERIC
- EBSCO databases
- Emerging Sources Citation Index
- ProQuest databases
- Scopus
