= Mimi Alemayehou =

Businesswoman

- Born: 1969 (age 56–57); Ethiopia
- Education: West Texas A&M University (BA); Fletcher School of Law and Diplomacy (Tufts University) (MA)
- Occupation: Development finance executive
- Known for: Executive Vice President, Overseas Private Investment Corporation (OPIC); U.S. Executive Director, African Development Bank
- Awards: Distinguished Honor Award

Mimi Alemayehou (born 1969) is a development finance executive who has served as Executive Vice President of the U.S. Overseas Private Investment Corporation (OPIC) and as United States Executive Director of the African Development Bank.

She is the recipient of a Distinguished Honor Award.

== Early life and education ==
Mimi Alemayehou is a naturalized U.S. citizen; she was born in Ethiopia and spent her childhood in Kenya before immigrating to the United States.

Alemayehou earned her bachelor's degree from West Texas A&M University and holds a master's degree in International Business and International Law and Development from the Fletcher School of Law and Diplomacy at Tufts University.

== Career ==
From March 2010 to April 2014, Alemayehou served as Executive Vice President of the Overseas Private Investment Corporation (OPIC).

In June 2010, President Barack Obama nominated Alemayehou to the board of directors of the African Development Foundation.

While at OPIC, Alemayehou oversaw a portfolio of approximately $16 billion invested in over 100 countries. During this time, the agency partnered with President Obama's Power Africa Initiative, a blueprint for improving access to electricity in underdeveloped regions of Africa. In March 2014, Alemayehou testified on behalf of OPIC at the United States Senate Committee on Foreign Relations hearing on the Power Africa Initiative.

Prior to her position at OPIC, Alemayehou served as the United States Executive Director at the African Development Bank (AfDB), where she executed board decisions on behalf of the U.S. government. She received a Distinguished Honor Award from then-U.S. Secretary of Treasury Henry Paulson for her service in this role. Prior to the AfDB, she was founder and Managing Partner of Trade Links, LLC, a development consulting firm that worked with clients on emerging markets issues and on promoting African exports under the African Growth and Opportunity Act.

Previously, Alemayehou was with the International Executive Service Corps where she managed a multi-country trade project in Africa. She also served as a Director of International Regulatory Affairs at WorldSpace Corporation, a satellite telecommunications company focused on emerging markets.

In December 2013, Forbes Magazine featured Alemayehou on its list of "The 20 Young Power Women in Africa 2013."

In August 2023, she was featured on Forbes' "50 Over 50" list under the Investment category.

== Other Activity ==
In 2015, Alemayehou signed an open letter which the ONE Campaign had been collecting signatures for; the letter was addressed to Angela Merkel and Nkosazana Dlamini-Zuma, urging them to focus on women as they serve as the head of the G7 in Germany and the AU in South Africa respectively, which will start to set the priorities in development funding before a main UN summit in September 2015 that will establish new development goals for the generation.
