= Justin Chinyanta =

African investment banker

Justin Chinyanta is a prominent African investment banker from Zambia. He is the chairman and chief executive officer of Loita Holdings Corporation Africa ("the Loita Group"), the parent company of pan-African investment banking corporation Loita Capital Partners International, pan-African financial ICT firm Fintech International, and Loita Transaction Services, the pan African switching and electronic funds solutions company.

Chinyanta is reputedly one of Zambia's wealthiest men, with investments in Banking, IT, Insurance and Property.

== Early life ==
Born in Zambia in 1959, Chinyanta was born into a family of seven. Chinyanta has a master's degree from The Fletcher School of Law and Diplomacy at Tufts University in Medford, Massachusetts and a Bachelor of Laws degree from the University of Zambia

== Career ==
=== Citibank ===
Chinyanta was admitted practitioner to the Zambian bar. Upon completing his law degree, he was hired by Citibank Zambia and placed into the company's apprentice program. Chinyanta spent his formative years studying banking on the Citibank Junior Program in Greece.

Upon his return to Zambia, Chinyanta quickly rose through the ranks at Citibank with his knack for closing deals and arranging financial products. In his late 20s, he was selected for an upper management position at Citibank Zambia. He eventually became VP (Vice President) of Citi's Zambia division and then the Africa Office, based in Nairobi, Kenya.

=== Loita Capital ===
Chinyanta and his co-founders (all from Citibank) quickly went to work closing a series of deals around Africa. Being an African, allowed Chinyanta and his team to navigate the market in a way that many foreign banks struggled to do. This meant that they had a strategic advantage in navigating the politically tenuous African market.

Chinyanta has led the development of the debt and capital markets throughout Africa. In a time when foreign banks were not interested in the potential of Africa as an emerging market, Chinyanta's company single-handedly arranged and facilitated some of the first bond issuances and capital market initiatives in the continent. To date, Loita Capital has arranged over $3Billion of deals throughout the continent, making Loita one of the most notable private finance houses operating in the continent.

Loita currently owns an extensive portfolio of companies, from credit providers such as AAR credit in Kenya; to banks such as Ecobank Malawi; to technology firms such as Fintech Kenya, Uganda, and Malawi and switching companies such as Kenswitch(Kenya), Zimswitch (Zimbabwe) and Zamlink (Zambia) as well as EFT Solutions (Ghana, Mauritius, and Zimbabwe).

== Achievements ==
- In 2008, Chinyanta was invited by Harvard University to become a Fellow of Harvard, at the Weatherhead Center for International Affairs. He spent a year in residence, assisting the university along with many other prominent business and academic leaders from around the world.
- Chinyanta is a member of the Duke of Edinburgh's Commonwealth Leaders Program. This is a panel of leaders from around the world who are annually selected by the Duke to assist in tackling global challenges.
- He was one of the pioneering members of the Colin Powell and Madelaine Albright led Initiative for Global Development's Frontier 100 Leaders;
- Chinyanta is the executive vice president of the Africa Business Roundtable, Southern Africa
- He sits on the editorial board of Africa Investor magazine.
- During the tenure of President Levy Mwanawasa of Zambia, he was an honorary member of the President's Investment and Business Council
- Chinyanta is a board member of AAR Credit Company in Kenya and Uganda; Ecobank Malawi and other numerous financial institutions
