= Action/2015 =

Global coalition

action/2015 was a global coalition of more than 2200 organisations and networks from over 150 countries, united by the belief that 2015 was a critical year for progress in the fight against climate change, poverty and inequality.

Throughout the year, the coalition engaged and mobilised the public at critical decision-making points to call on leaders to commit to strong goals and agreements at two crucial UN summits in 2015 — the UN General Assembly and the UN Climate Change Conference. Millions of activists gathered through action/2015 to pressure world leaders to tackle poverty, inequality and climate change.

31 million campaign actions were taken in 157 countries through action/2015.

== Key moments of the campaign ==
The action/2015 coalition came together during key moments through the year:

- action/2015 launch
- International Women's Day
- Earth Day
- May Mobilisations
- G7
- Financing For Development
- International Youth Day
- UN General Assembly
- UN Climate Change Conference

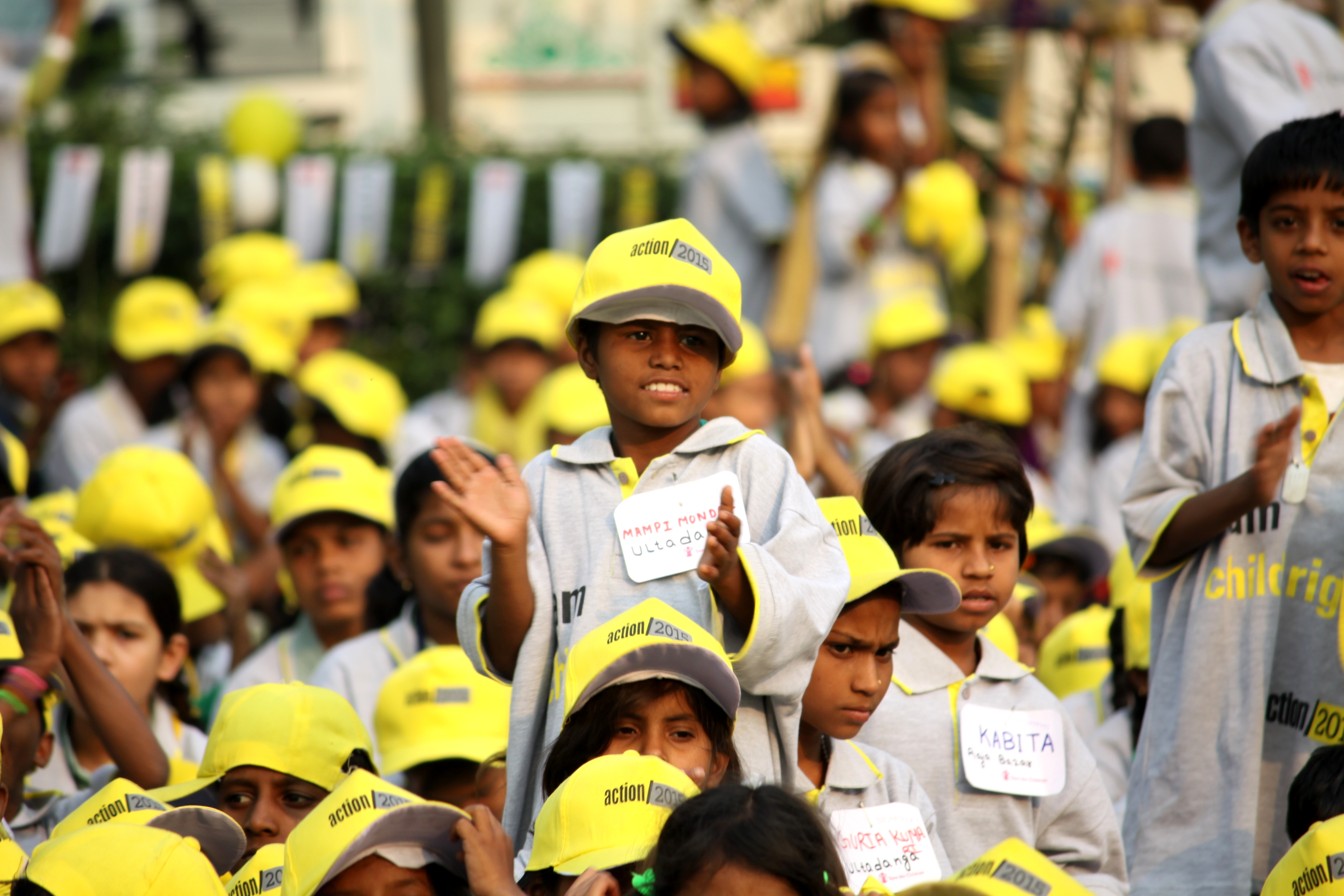
Children take part in an action/2015 launch event on 15 January 2015

=== action/2015 launch ===
The campaign launched on 15 January 2015 in 60 countries around the world. 32 high-profile figures including Malala Yousafzai, Desmond Tutu, Shakira, Bill Gates, and Matt Damon joined the call to action, adding their name to an open letter addressed to world leaders.

Around the world, people took to the streets in demonstrations to demand their leaders take action – including Liberia, Mauritius, Belgium, El Salvador, and Barbados.

=== International Women's Day ===
On International Women's Day, 8 March 2015, campaigners around the world, including those in Egypt and Bangladesh, gathered to call on world leaders to use the upcoming UN summits on climate change and sustainable development to deliver ambitious actions to fulfil the rights of women and girls around the world.

=== Earth Day ===
On 18 April, ahead of the meeting of Finance Ministers in Washington, D.C. for the annual spring meeting of the World Bank, action/2015 joined the Global Citizen 2015 Earth Day event where a quarter million global citizens gathered on the National Mall in Washington, DC, with over 2 million more people watching the event online.

=== May Mobilisations ===
In May, over 22 million people took to the streets in over 150 countries during 14 days of thematic action.

Some key highlights of the month-long activity included World Vision’s Global Week of Action which generated 20.4 million actions and featured more than 30,000 events in Bangladesh; Mali texting 5 million people in partnership with Orange; the Poverty is Sexist and #strengthie campaigns, which attracted support from celebrities including Malala Yousafzai, Beyoncé and Shonda Rhimes; and HelpAge International’s All Ages Action Day supported by Desmond Tutu.

=== G7 ===
On 7 and 8 June 2015, world leaders from the G7 nations met in Germany to the world's pressing issues. action/2015 joined the free "United Against Poverty" concert in Königsplatz, featuring inspirational speakers, musicians, activists and celebrities including Usher, Afrojack, and Ellen Johnson Sirleaf to ask G7 leaders for their involvement in the fight against poverty, inequality, and climate change.

=== Financing For Development ===
In July 2015, action/2015 campaigners from 90 countries around the world called on their governments to tackle tax injustice, prioritise the poorest, and keep their promises on aid commitments and public spending to coincide with the Financing For Development meeting in Addis Adaba, Ethiopia.

=== International Youth Day ===
On 12 August 2015, action/2015 coordinated one of the largest global youth mobilisations in history for International Youth Day. Under the banner "#YouthPower: it's down to us", action/2015 youth campaigners in over 80 countries conducted over 100 mobilisation events in which over 115,000 people worldwide took to the streets, attended workshops, and met with government officials.

=== action/1D ===
Ahead of the international summits, One Direction added their voice to the action/2015 campaign, calling on their fans to make their voices heard on issues, such as poverty and inequality, by submitting videos and photos to their website. More than 80,000 people from 172 countries responded to the call to action.

One Direction's involvement in the campaign generated significant interest, with over 2.5 billion Twitter impressions of the #action1D hashtag and support from Hillary Clinton.

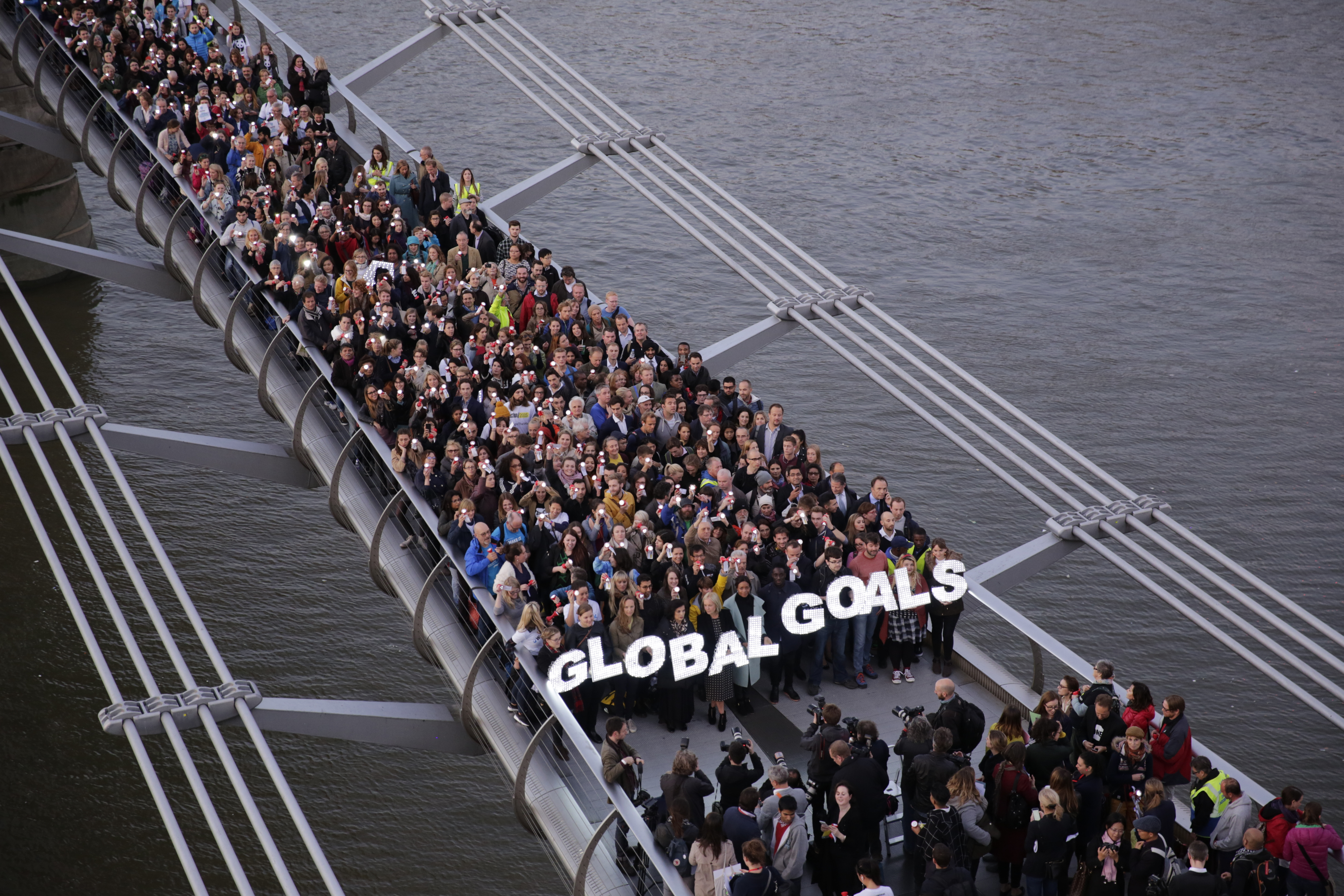
Thousands of action/2015 campaigners on Millennium Bridge, London in September 2015

=== UN General Assembly ===
On 24 September 2015, the evening before the Global Goals were adopted at the United Nations General Assembly, the action/2015 movement took to the streets in 105 countries.

These events, which included locations, such as Millennium Bridge in London, Purana Qila in New Delhi, Largo da Batata square in São Paulo, and outside the United Nations building in New York City, saw over 250,000 people in attendance.

action/2015 set the narrative around the Sustainable Development Goals, highlighting how poverty, inequality and climate change are interlinked issues.

On 25 September 2015, in his address to the UN Sustainable Development Summit, Secretary General of Amnesty International Salil Shetty referenced the action/2015 mobilisation, saying, "Thousands of people marched last night for the Sustainable Development Goals to light the way. They called for authentic leadership from you, leadership with integrity, leadership from the heart. I know that you can live up to their hopes."

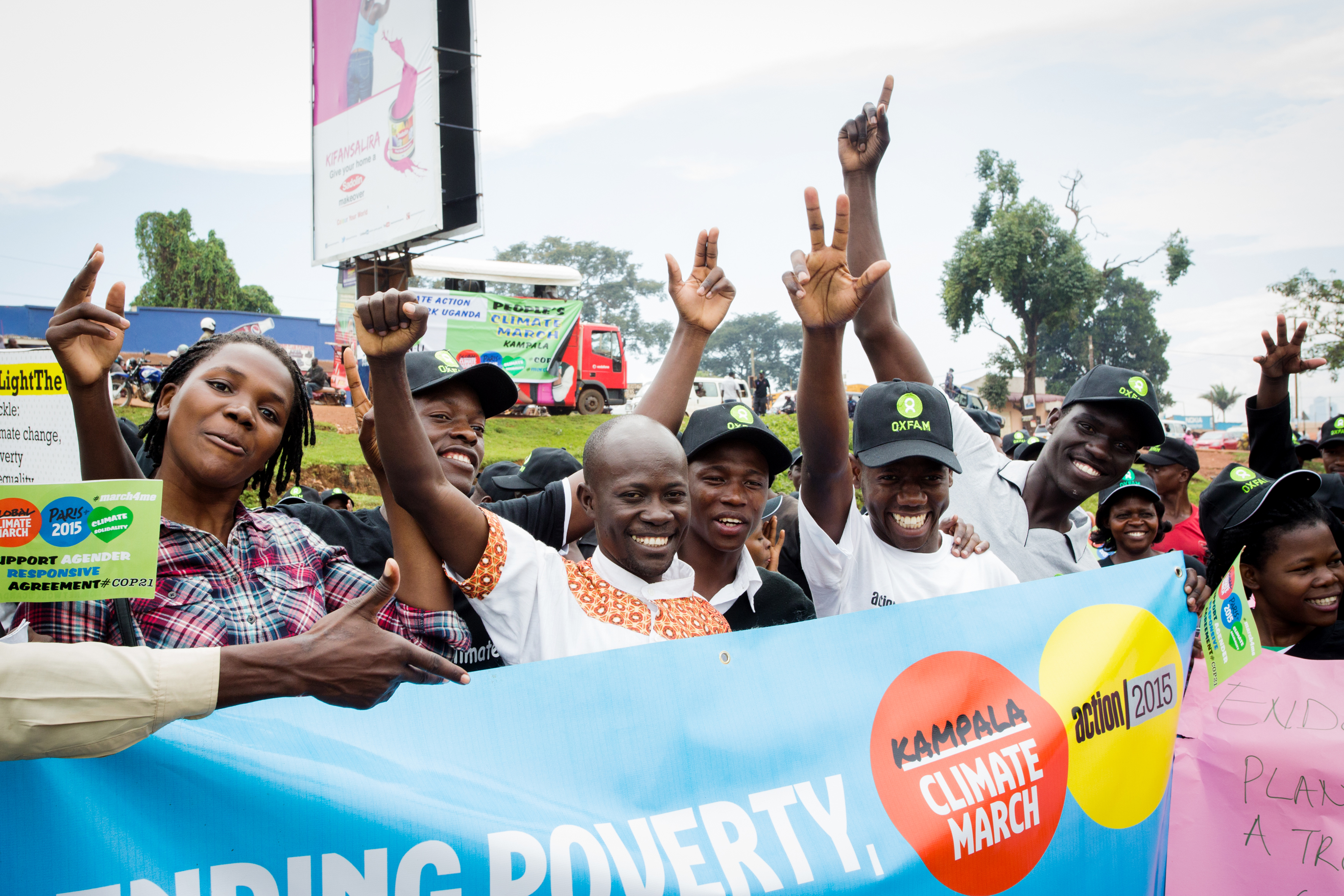
action/2015 campaigners participate in a Global Climate March in Kampala, Uganda

=== UN Climate Change Conference ===
On 28 and 29 November 2015, as governments of over 190 countries prepared to deliver a historic new global climate agreement at COP21 in Paris, the action/2015 movement joined with thousands of people around the world for the Global Climate March. 785,000 people marched at over 2,300 events in 175 countries, making the march the biggest climate mobilisation in history at the time.

This included over 60,000 people in Melbourne, 100,000 in India, over 50,000 in London, 2,500 in Chile, and over 20,000 in Malawi.

In Uganda, action/2015 was a key organiser of the Climate March in Kampala, echoing the call for climate action from Pope Francis, who was in the country as part of his first trip to Africa.
