= KCMS =

Contemporary Christian music radio station in Edmonds, Washington

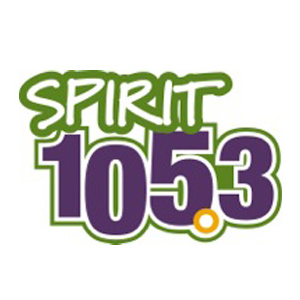
- Edmonds, Washington; United States
- Broadcast area: Seattle metropolitan area
- Frequency: 105.3 MHz (HD Radio)
- Branding: Spirit 105-3

Programming
- Format: Christian adult contemporary
- Subchannels: HD2: KCIS simulcast

Ownership
- Owner: CRISTA Ministries
- Sister stations: KCIS, KWPZ

History
- First air date: 1960 (as KGFM)
- Former call signs: KGFM (1960–1970); KBIQ (1970–1984)
- Call sign meaning: "King's Christian Music Station"

Technical information
- Licensing authority: FCC
- Facility ID: 14505
- Class: C1
- ERP: 54,000 watts
- HAAT: 385 meters (1,263 ft)
- Transmitter coordinates: 47.544°N 122.108°W

Links
- Public license information: Public file; LMS
- Webcast: Listen Live
- Website: spirit1053.com

KCMS (105.3 FM, "Spirit 105-3") is a radio station licensed to Edmonds, Washington, serving the Seattle market and broadcasting a Christian adult contemporary music format.

The station broadcasts at 105.3 MHz from Seattle (with a transmitter on Cougar Mountain in Issaquah), and includes a translator broadcasting on 92.1 MHz (K221BG) in Aberdeen, Washington. It is owned and operated by Crista Ministries. Studios are located in the Seattle suburb of Shoreline.

KCMS broadcasts in HD Radio.

- KCMS (HD) is a simulcast of "Spirit 105-3" on HD 1.
- KCIS 630 AM is simulcast in HD on HD 2.

The station is ranked 18th in the Seattle-Tacoma Arbitron PPM ratings data for August 2018 with 2.5 percent of the market share.

== History ==
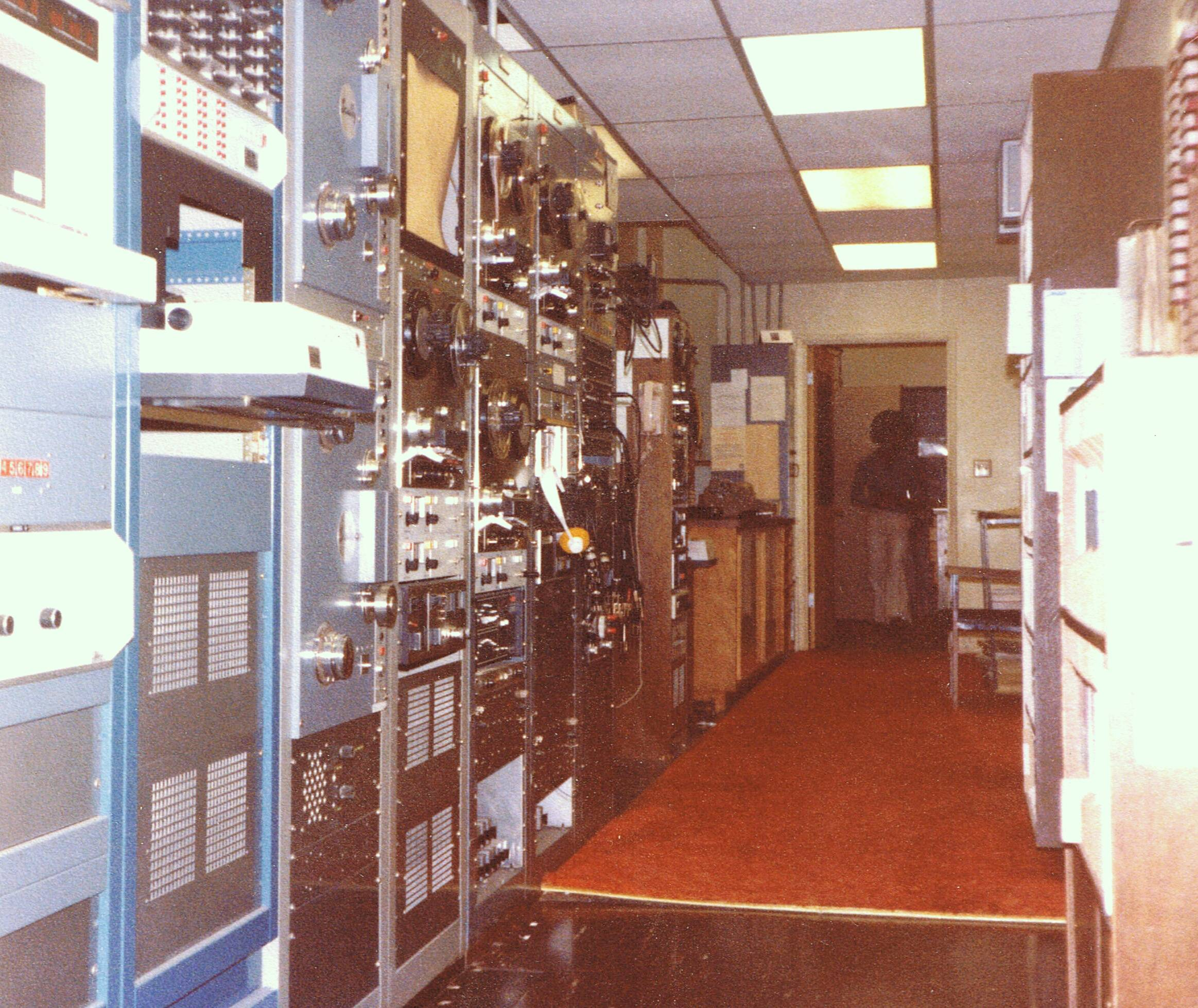

Prior to 1984, KCMS was known as KBIQ; the original calls were KGFM. KBIQ was used from about 1970 to 1984. That callsign now belongs to a Contemporary Christian music station in Colorado Springs, Colorado. The prior usage of the KCMS callsign was for a non-religious station broadcasting at 103.1 MHz from Indio, California. In that context, the "CMS" was promoted as meaning "Classical Music Station."

In the late 1960s into the early 1970s, KBIQ was one of the most powerful FM stations on the west coast of the United States. The station transmitted with an effective radiated power of 240,000 watts from the tower site of KGDN at King's Garden (now Crista) in north Seattle (19303 Fremont Ave North).

The station signal could be heard from Vancouver, British Columbia to Vancouver, Washington. The stereo on hour logo music was edited from Mission Impossible — Operation Charm and had a 747 going from left to right channels. John Pricer was the station voiceover. "From Vancouver to Vancouver, this is the all northwest sound of stereo 105, KBIQ in Edmonds" was their top-of-the-hour ID, along with slight variants.

KBIQ stood for "known by its quality," and played easy listening music and sprinkled with some Christian instrumental music and short local newscasts. The station was automated using IGM equipment and home recorded 14" reels, but had regular live news announcers. The station also supplied music to K-Happy (KHPE), a Christian formatted FM station in Albany, Oregon.

The station had a good following and decent ratings, until about 1973, when Bonneville's owned and operated KIRO-FM (later branded as KSEA, now KKWF) went to the Bonneville beautiful music format.

Other Seattle stations doing easy or modified versions of the format included KLSN-FM (now KJAQ) (from the late 1960s to early 1970s), KIXI-FM (now KJEB), KBBX, then KEZX (now KPNW-FM) (mid 1960s to 1979), KEUT (now KSWD) (mid-1970s), and low powered station KBRD (now KHTP).

The current Christian radio format debuted in 1996, first branded as 105.3 FM KCMS, then in 2002 as Spirit 105.3. The station now calls themselves Spirit 105–3.

== Jingles ==
KCMS in its current CCM format had three jingle companies produce jingles for it. GMI Media in Seattle was the first, doing three jingle packages.

The station's current jingles are produced by Reelworld of Seattle, which started on April 1, 2024. It's a re-sing of Sunny 2016 with the station's Heritage logo that was previously done by TM Studios from 2006 to 2024.
