= SAGE Open =

- Discipline: Humanities, social science, behavioural sciences
- Language: English

Publication details
- History: 2011-present
- Publisher: SAGE Publications
- Frequency: Upon acceptance
- Open access: Yes
- License: CC-BY
- Impact factor: 2.032 (SSCI), 1.900 (Scopus CiteScore) (2021)

Standard abbreviations
- ISO 4: SAGE Open

Indexing
- ISSN: 2158-2440
- LCCN: 2010202574
- OCLC no.: 827827284

Links
- Journal homepage; Online access; Online archive

Sage Open is an open access, peer-reviewed, academic mega journal. It is the "first broad spectrum open access title aimed specifically at the behavioral and social sciences communities".

It was established in May 2011 and is published by SAGE Publications. The charge to authors (APC) was initially free, then US$99, but from mid 2015 this went to $395. By 2019 it was $480, followed by an increase to $800 later that year following the journal's acceptance into Web of Science. As of 1 January 2023, the APC is $1,500.

== Abstracting and indexing ==
The journal is abstracted and indexed in Scopus, the Social Science Citation Index with an impact factor of 2.032, DOAJ and ERIC.
