= Journal of Consumer Behaviour =

- Subject: Consumer behaviour
- Language: English
- Edited by: Steven D'Alessandro; Varsha Jain

Publication details
- History: 2001–present
- Publisher: John Wiley & Sons
- Impact factor: 5.2 (2025)

Standard abbreviations
- ISO 4: J. Consum. Behav.

Indexing
- ISSN: 1472-0817 (print); 1479-1838 (web)
- LCCN: 2005206515
- OCLC no.: 797198459

Links
- Journal homepage; Online access; Online archive

The Journal of Consumer Behaviour is a bimonthly peer-reviewed academic journal dedicated to the study of consumer behaviour. It was established in 2001 and is published by John Wiley & Sons.

== Editorial board ==
The Editors-in-Chief is Professor Steven D'Alessandro (Edith Cowan University) and Professor Varsha Jain (ESSCA University).

== Rankings ==
According to the Australian Business Deans Council, the journal in 2026 is an A-Level.

According to the Journal Citation Reports, the journal has a 2026 impact factor of 7.0, ranking it 46 out of 325 journals in the category "Business".
