= Neil Smit =

American businessman

- Born: Kornelis Smit, Jr. 1960 (age 65–66)
- Education: Duke University
- Alma mater: Fletcher School of Law and Diplomacy
- Occupations: Vice Chairman, Comcast Corporation

Neil Smit (born 1960) is an American businessman and former CEO of Comcast Cable, an American corporation providing cable, entertainment, and communications products and services.

== Collegiate education and military service ==
Smit earned a Bachelor of Science in oceanography & geology from Duke University and then achieved a Masters of Science Degree from Tufts University's Fletcher School of Law and Diplomacy in international business. Smit served in the United States Navy, serving for five years as a member on the SEALs team and was honorably discharged from the United States Navy at the commissioned officer rank of lieutenant commander. Smit is married and he and his wife have two sons, though he keeps his personal life very private.

== Career and other business activities ==
Smit was CEO of Comcast Corporation Cable until 2017. In a statement, Smit cited "injuries" he sustained from his previous career as reasons why he's changing positions. But also approaching 60, he said he's looking forward to spending more time with his family. His reported annual compensation was $19,856,203, which placed him among the top 200 highest paid CEOs in America. After that, Smit joined Comcast in March 2010 from Charter Communications where he was chief executive officer and director since 2005. Prior to joining Charter, he was the president of Time Warner's America Online Access Business, where he oversaw Internet access services, including America Online (AOL), CompuServe and Netscape ISPs. He also worked at AOL as executive vice president, member services, and chief operating officer of MapQuest. Neil also was a regional president with Nabisco and had a number of management positions at Pillsbury.

Smit was the chairman of CableLabs, the research and development consortium for the cable industry, and as chairman of the board of directors of the National Cable & Telecommunications Association (NCTA). He also is on the board of directors for C-SPAN.

He is on the boards of Qualcomm, Quant Network and Ocean Exploration Trust.

== Community relations ==
Smit has remained engaged with the veteran community and has led Comcast's commitment to hire at least 10,000 veterans from 2015 to 2017.
