= SolBridge International School of Business =

Solbridge International School of Business
- Type: Private business school
- Established: 2007
- Affiliations: Woosong University
- Dean: Joshua K. Park
- Faculty: 34 (2018)
- Students: 1600 (2019)
- Location: Dong-gu, Daejeon, South Korea; 36°20′18″N 127°25′56″E
- Campus: Urban
- Colors: Blue
- Website: www.solbridge.ac.kr
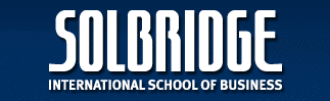

SolBridge International School of Business is a private non profit AACSB accredited business school in Daejeon, South Korea, established by Woosong University in March 2007.

== About SolBridge ==
The founder of SolBridge, Sung-kyung Kim, designed SolBridge as a multinational, multicultural, business school. The school was built around a four-year undergraduate program and has since developed a portfolio of graduate programs (MBA and specialized master's degrees).

Joshua Park, who serves as its dean since August 2021, is a graduate of Harvard Law School with extensive experience in negotiation, debate, and mediation which are all reflected in the books he has authored and research publications.

SolBridge is the first business school in Korea with an international faculty and student body. International students come from 70 countries and represent 80% of the student population.

At SolBridge, all courses are taught in English and students have to study Korean, Chinese and Japanese languages.

SolBridge graduates now work in nations around the world.

SolBridge is accredited by the AACSB board of executives. It is the youngest business school in AACSB's history to receive this accreditation, just 7 years after its establishment.

Partnerships exist with 260 schools and universities around the world, giving students opportunities to study in Asia, Europe, Australia and in the Americas.

SolBridge features an ultramodern high-rise campus located a few hundred meters from the Daejeon Station, a central node in the country's high-speed rail network.

== Notable alumni and faculty ==
- The Anh Phan, travel influencer, book author and Internet personality
