= Bernd Mützelburg =

German diplomat

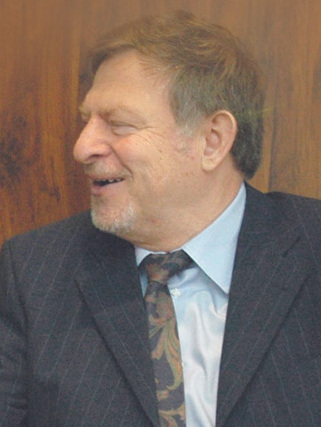
Bernd Mützelburg

Bernd Mützelburg (born 17 January 1944 in Mainz) is a German diplomat. Since February 16, 2009 he has been working as a special envoy to Afghanistan and Pakistan.

He studied law at University of Mainz and Marburg and later completed his M.A. at Fletcher School for Law and Diplomacy in Medford, Massachusetts.

From March 2006 to February 2009, he worked as an ambassador to India.

He now acts as a partner at the Lobby Firm Diploconsult, which includes of various former ambassadors engaging in diplomatic strategy advisory.
