= Woosong University =

University in Daejeon, South Korea

- Established: 1954 (Opening of Woosong University on March 8, 1995)
- President: Go-Hwan Jin
- Students: 5,349
- Undergraduates: 5,164
- Postgraduates: 135
- Location: #17-2, Jayang-dong, Dong-ku, Daejeon, Korea. 300-718, Daejeon, Daejeon, South Korea; 36.338°N 127.446°E
- Campus: Urban 79,660 m^{2} (Daejeon Campus)
- Mascot: The Hawk
- Website: http://english.wsu.ac.kr/

- Woosong University
- Hangul: 우송대학교
- Hanja: 又松大學校
- RR: Usong daehakgyo
- MR: Usong taehakkyo

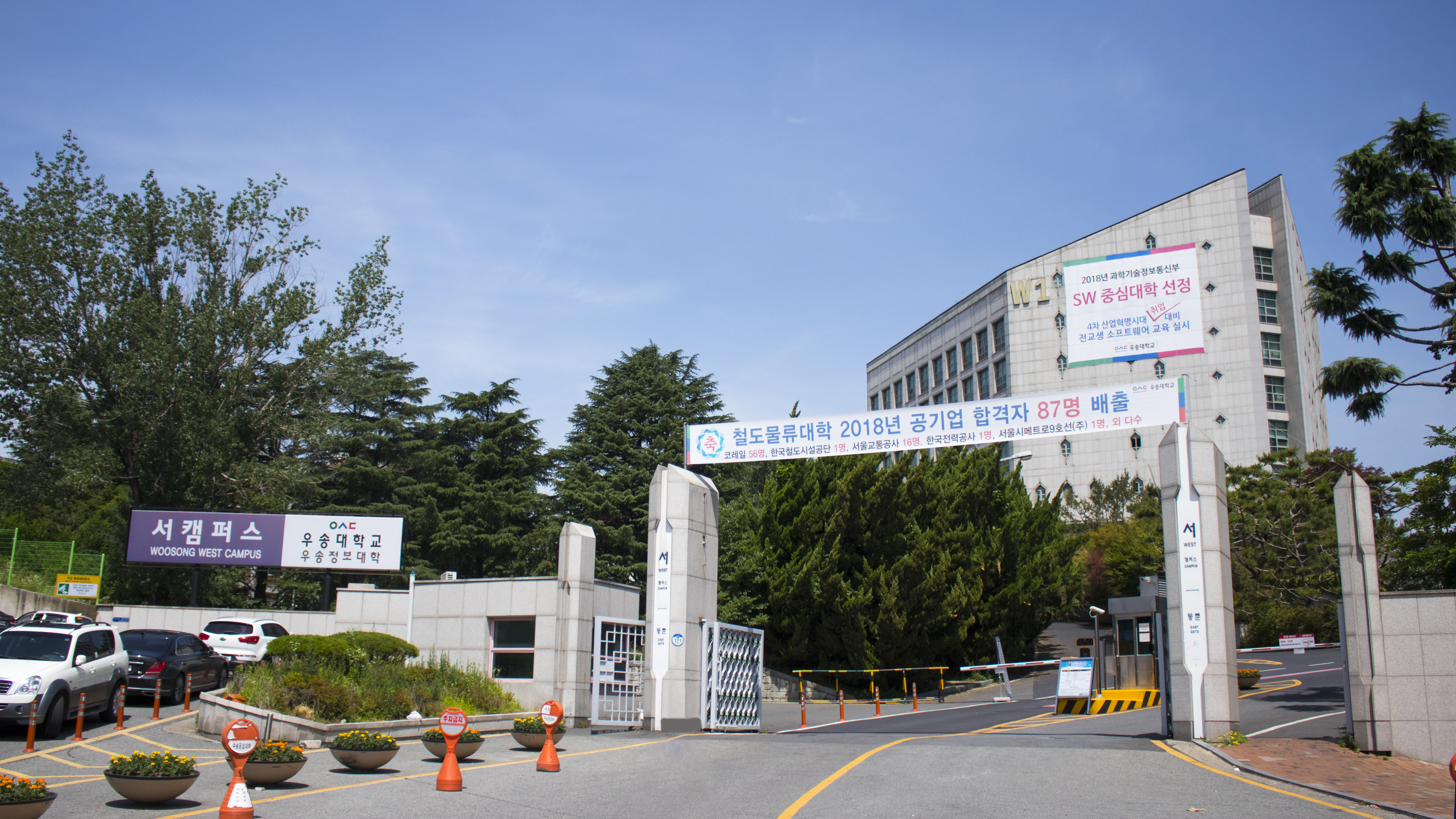
A view of Woosong University

Woosong University (Korean: 우송대학교) is a 4-year university located in Daejeon, South Korea providing a specialized curriculum based on foreign-language and IT education for every major field of study.

== History ==
- 1954: Woosong Educational Foundation established
- 1995: Opening of Woosong University (8 Departments, 950 students enlisted)
- 1996: Graduate School of Industrial Information established
- 2007: Sobridge International School of Business established
- 2009: Establishment of Nursing Science Department
- 2011: Sol Hospital, a simulated hospital, opened.
- 2014: Sol International School (SIS) opened
- 2016: Endicott College established

== Symbols ==
Logo: It was used in 1996 as a municipal university.. This is the expression of the practical academy of the mailer with the foundation of the academic, scientific thinking, and practicality, and aims to nurture the necessary manpower that is recognized in society.

Symbolic animals: Falcon is used to symbolize solitude and passion.

Symbol Tree: It is a pine tree. It contains the willingness of students to devote themselves to their studies, just like a pine tree that does not shake in the wind. It is also a symbol of the school corporation, and is used in the name of Sol Bridge, Soldorado, and Solfain.

CHARACTER: I was writing a character who personified Falcon, but since 2008, I have been using characters that personified the airplane. This is in line with the internationalization strategy program WORLD STUDENT PLAN.

== Undergraduate Schools ==
- Undergraduate School of Design and Information

=== Techno Media Convergence Division ===
The Techno Media Convergence division at Woosong University focuses on interdisciplinary education combining media, design, and digital technologies.

Within the division, the Media Design and Video major is offered. The program covers areas such as visual communication, digital content design, and video production, and reflects an interdisciplinary approach that integrates design with software and digital technologies.

The curriculum includes coursework in media production, design theory, and digital content planning, and may be associated with certification-related training in visual design and digital media fields.

- Undergraduate School of Health and Welfare
- Undergraduate School of International Studies
- Undergraduate School of Railroad Transportation
- Undergraduate School of Tourism and Culinary Management
- Undergraduate School of Business SolBridge (B.B.A.)
- Undergraduate School of Sol International School (Culinary Art, Railroad Integrated Systems, Medical Services Management, Hotel Management, Media and Communication Art, Restaurant and Food Service Entrepreneurship)

== Graduate Schools ==
- Graduate School of Industrial Information
- Department of Computer Design
- Graduate School of TESOL-MALL
- Graduate School of Health and Welfare
- Graduate School of Management
- SolBridge International School of Business

== Campus ==
The main campus is located in Jayang-dong, Dong-ku, Daejeon.

== The History of University ==
Woosong University belongs to the Woosong Education Foundation which has a history of work in education, teaching and training. Founded by the late Kim Jung-Woo.

Woosong University is a specialized university, located in Daejeon, South Korea providing specialized curricula based on practice and theory. It currently runs three international schools: SolBridge International School of Business, Sol International School and Endicott College of International Studies. Education in the International schools is conducted solely in English. Since the establishment of the university in 1995, Woosong University has signed more than 100 Memorandums of Understanding (MOU) with universities and schools in more than 30 countries. Among the programs that have been developed are student and faculty exchange programs, joint research, dual degree, Study Abroad, and other programs.

== International Education System ==
- Sol International School (SIS)

Sol International School (SIS) was created in 2014, as a result of Woosong University's "Global Initiative". SIS offers six English-instructed specialized international programs in the fields of Culinary Arts (SICA), Hotel Management (SIHOM), Medical Services Management (SIMED), Railroad Integrated Systems (SIRA), Restaurant & Food Service Entrepreneurship (SIRES) and Media & Communications Arts (SIMA), for the completion of four-year bachelor's degrees in each program. Two-year associate degrees are also offered in Hotel Management and Culinary Arts.

Students are admitted based on past academic achievements and English language performance score. Newly admitted full-time students are awarded with up to 70% scholarship covering tuition and enrollment fees based on cumulative GPA and English test score (if applicable).

- Endicott College

Endicott College of International Studies was established in 2016.

== See also ==
- List of colleges and universities in South Korea
- Education in South Korea
- SolBridge International School of Business
- Endicott College
