= Daniel Parker =

Daniel, Dan, or Danny Parker may refer to:

- Daniel Parker (instrument maker) (ca. 1700-1730), English violin maker
- Daniel Parker (silversmith) (1726–1785), American silversmith
- Daniel Parker (Baptist) (1781–1844), leader in the Primitive Baptist Church in the Southern United States
- Daniel Pinckney Parker (1781–1850), merchant, shipbuilder and businessman in Boston, Massachusetts
- Daniel Parker (general) (1782–1846), officer in the United States Army
- Daniel McNeill Parker (1822–1907), Canadian physician and politician
- Daniel Parker (priest) (died 1945), Archdeacon of Winnipeg
- Daniel Parker (artist) (born 1959), American wildlife sculptor and painter
- Daniel Parker (footballer) (born 1974), Australian rules footballer
- Danny Parker (songwriter) (born 1988), American songwriter
- Dan Parker, chairman of the Indiana Democratic Party
- Dan Parker, member of the band A Change of Pace
- Dan Parker (sportswriter) (1893–1967), American sportswriter
- Daniel Parker (make-up artist), English make-up artist
- Daniel Parker (government official) (1925–1992), American business owner and administrator of the United States Agency for International Development
- Danny Parker, character in Striking Vipers
