= Gayle Smith =

US Politician

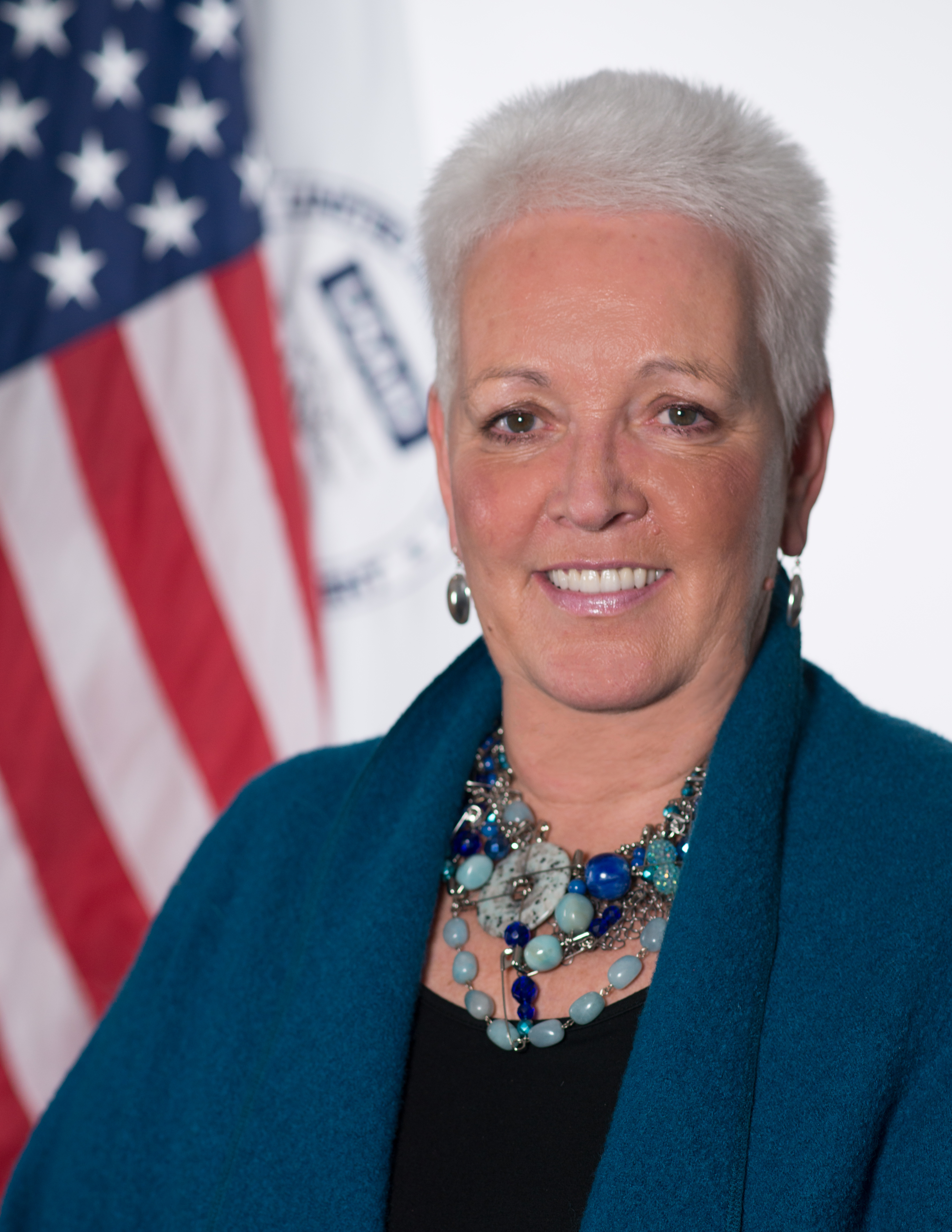

President and CEO of the ONE Campaign
- In office March 28, 2017 – January 1, 2024
- Preceded by: Michael J. Elliott
- Succeeded by: John Spears (acting)

17th Administrator of the United States Agency for International Development
- In office December 2, 2015 – January 20, 2017
- President: Barack Obama
- Preceded by: Alfonso Lenhardt (acting)
- Succeeded by: Wade Warren (acting)

Personal details
- Born: Gayle Elizabeth Smith; February 23, 1956 (age 70)
- Party: Democratic
- Education: University of Colorado, Boulder (BA)

Gayle Elizabeth Smith (born February 23, 1956) is the former CEO of the One Campaign. Smith was formerly Coordinator for Global COVID Response and Health Security at the U.S. Department of State. and was the former Administrator of the United States Agency for International Development (USAID).

== Early life and education ==
Smith is from Bexley, Ohio, a suburb of Columbus, Ohio.

In 1974, Smith graduated from Bexley High School. In 1978, she received a B.A. from the University of Colorado Boulder in English.

== Career ==
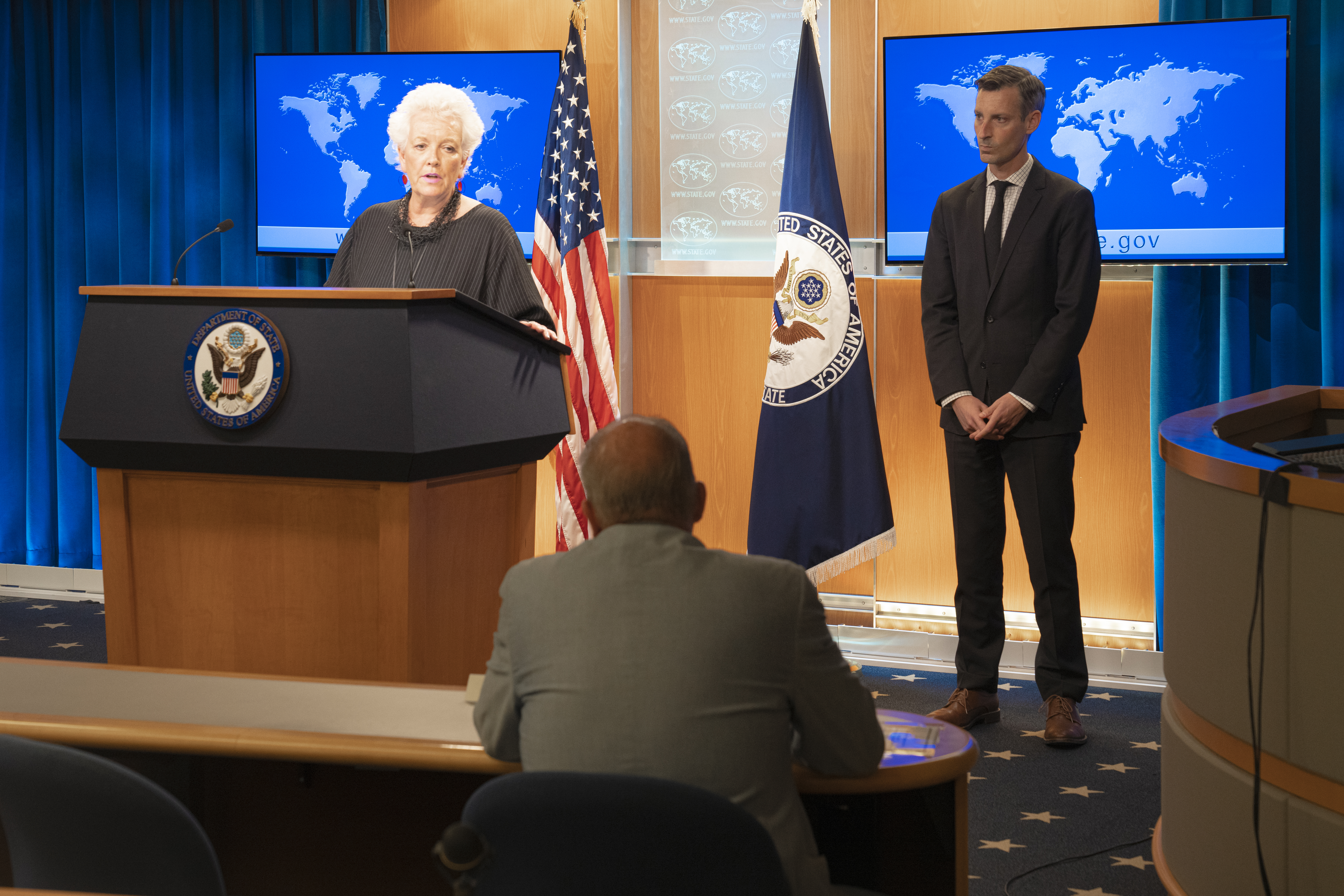
Smith, as State Department Coordinator for Global COVID-19 Response and Health Security, speaks to the press alongside State Department spokesperson Ned Price in 2021

After college, Smith worked as a journalist for over 20 years, where she was based in Africa and wrote for publications like BBC News and the Financial Times.

From 1994 to 1998, Smith served as Senior Advisor to the Administrator and Chief of Staff for U.S. Agency for International Development (USAID).

From 1998 to 2001, she was Special Assistant to President Bill Clinton and Senior Director for African Affairs at the U.S. National Security Council.

In 2001, Smith became a Senior Fellow at the Center for American Progress. As part of this position, she worked on the Sustainable Security Project and co-founded the Enough Project, working as Co-Chair, as well as the Modernizing Foreign Assistance Network. The ENOUGH Project was created to end genocide and crimes against humanity.

From 2005 to 2007, Smith was the Chairman of the Working Group Chair on Global Poverty for the Clinton Global Initiative.

In 2009, Smith joined the U.S. National Security Council, where she was Special Assistant to President Obama and Senior Director for Development and Democracy, where her focus was on global development and humanitarian assistance.

On April 30, 2015, President Obama announced his nomination of Smith to be the new administrator for the U.S. Agency for International Development (USAID), to succeed Dr. Rajiv Shah, who resigned the post in February 2015. Despite some opposition to her appointment, and a delayed Senate confirmation, Smith was confirmed on November 30, 2015.

As Administrator of the United States Agency for International Development (USAID), Smith's focus was on development and international affairs.

Smith has worked as a consultant to various non-governmental agencies like the Cooperation Canada (formerly the Canadian Council for International Cooperation), Dutch Interchurch Aid, Norwegian Church Relief, UNICEF, the World Bank, among others.

On March 28, 2017, Smith joined the Bono's ONE Campaign, succeeding Michael J. Elliott.

On March 5, 2021, it was announced that Smith would be the coordinator of the global COVID response and health security at the U.S. Department of State, where she focused on COVID financing, capacity, and global efforts to distribute COVID vaccines equitably. As part of this program, Smith worked on the 2021 COVAX Investment Opportunity, an approach to funding the World Health Organization's COVAX Facility, which provides vaccinations to low- and middle-income countries. She returned to ONE on December 6, 2021.

== Selected membership ==
- Acumen Fund, Acumen Fund Advisory Council
- Africa-America Institute, Board Member
- Center for a New American Security, Advisory Board Member
- ASSET Campaign, Founding Board Member
- Council on Foreign Relations, Board Member
- DATA/ONE Campaign, Advisory Board Member
- Global Fairness Initiative, Advisory Board Member
- National Security Network, Board Member
- Oxfam America, Board Member
- USA for Africa, Board Member

== Selected awards ==
- 1989: World Affairs Council, World Journalism Award
- 1991: World Hunger Year Award
- 1999: U.S. National Security Council, Samuel Nelson Drew Award for Distinguished Contribution in Pursuit of Global Peace

== Selected works and publications ==
- Sinai, Nick; Smith, Gayle (6 December 2013). "The United States Releases its Second Open Government National Action Plan". Whitehouse.gov.
- Smith, Gayle (6 November 2014). "Hailing the Contributions of the Private and Non-Profit Sectors to the Ebola Fight". Whitehouse.gov.
- Smith, Gayle E. (11 October 2017). "This year, The Day of the Girl is marked by a state of emergency". CNN.
- Smith, Gayle E. (21 August 2018). "Lessons from Mandela: Making humility count again". The East African.
- Smith, Gayle E. (28 March 2019). "Cyclone-lashed southern Africa needs more support for recovery". Axios.
- Smith, Gayle E. (16 July 2019). "The U.S. Helped Defeat Ebola in 2014. Now, We're Watching a Crisis Become a Catastrophe". Time.
- Finucane, Anne; Smith, Gayle E. (1 December 2020). "Commentary: Don't let the COVID crisis reverse our progress in fighting AIDS". Fortune.
- Smith, Gayle (22 December 2020). "To End a Global Pandemic, We Need Global Solutions: In My View". Development Co-operation Report 2020: Learning from Crises, Building Resilience. Development Co-operation Report. Paris: OECD Publishing: 47–49. doi:10.1787/20747721. ISBN 978-92-64-48131-2.
- Smith, Gayle E. (4 March 2021). "Development Depends on More Than Aid". Foreign Affairs.

Political offices
Preceded by Alfonso Lenhardt; Acting	Administrator of the United States Agency for International Development; 2015–2017	Succeeded by Wade Warren; Acting
