= The Bully, the Bullied, and the Bystander =

2003 nonfiction book by Barbara Coloroso

- Author: Barbara Coloroso
- Publisher: HarperCollins
- Publication date: August 18, 2003
- ISBN: 9780006394204

The Bully, the Bullied, and the Bystander (full title: The Bully, the Bullied, and the Bystander: From Preschool to High School—How Parents and Teachers Can Help Break the Cycle of Violence) is a 2003 nonfiction book by Barbara Coloroso. The book covers the issue of school bullying and the roles played by those involved, including the victims and bystanders.

== Synopsis ==
The book examines the phenomena of bullying, particularly amongst students, including taunting, tormenting, and aggressive behavior by stronger students against weaker students. It describes the key players as well as the problems and possible solutions in dealing with them. It also discusses the roles of parents, students, and teachers in such situations as well as what they can and should do. The author lived in Littleton Colorado when the Columbine High School massacre happened and she discussed how bullying contributed to this shooting and perhaps other School shootings and how bullying prevention programs may make them less likely if not prevent all of them.

Before writing this book she wrote a previous book, "Kids Are Worth It!" which provides child rearing advice that helps prevent bullying later in life, including advising to avoid corporal punishment, which often correlates with more child abuse and teaches children to use violence, including bullying those smaller than the child. After writing this book she wrote "Extraordinary Evil: A Short Walk to Genocide" which discusses how bullying can can be a contributing factor to other more serious crimes including Wars or Genocide.

== 2010 edition ==
A 2010 edition of the book included updated & modernized information.
