= Barbara Coloroso =

American writer

- Born: 1948 (age 77–78)
- Occupations: Author, public speaker, consultant
- Known for: Child rearing and bullying prevention

Barbara Coloroso (born 1948) is a former Franciscan nun who became a secular best-selling author, public speaker, and consultant advising on child rearing tactics, preventing bullying, and escalating violence that may partly result from bullying or abusive child rearing tactics. She appeared on major TV networks, Cable News networks and other media outlets, including newspapers and magazines.

== Published work ==
=== Kids Are Worth It ===
This was Coloroso's first best-selling book, published in 1994 and followed by a revised edition in 2002. In the book, she describes three parenting styles: the strict and controlling "Brick-wall" parent, the inconsistent "Jellyfish" parent, and the "Backbone" parent, which combines flexibility with firmness when necessary. Coloroso recommends the "Backbone" approach which includes giving children some freedom when minor decisions are concerned, while also setting firmer boundaries when more serious issues arise, such as when dangerous activities are concerned, or regarding drinking at an early age.

=== The Bully, the Bullied, and the Bystander ===
The Bully, the Bullied, and the Bystander (full title: The Bully, the Bullied, and the Bystander: From Preschool to High School—How Parents and Teachers Can Help Break the Cycle of Violence) is a best selling 2003 nonfiction book. The book covers the issue of school bullying and the roles played by those involved, including the victims and bystanders.

=== Extraordinary Evil: A Short Walk to Genocide ===
Extraordinary Evil: A Short Walk to Genocide 2007 describes how she believes that bullying desensitizes people and may lead to escalating violence later in life including War and Genocide, focusing mainly on the Rwandan Genocide. She cites the history of genocide as described by Samantha Power in A Problem from Hell which recommended a modest number of crack troops could have prevented the genocide and cites General Roméo Dallaire's assessment that 5,000 troops would have been required to make a decisive and sweeping difference, which may have prevented the genocide in the short term. Barbara Coloroso focuses more on one of the long term contributing causes of violence which desensitizes people to growing amount of violence and advises to prevent bullying before it escalates and teach better child rearing tactics which will make people much less likely to resort to violence later in life. It's also important to provide educational and economic opportunities so people aren't forced into desperate situations.

=== Other books ===
- Winning At Parenting Without Beating Your Kids 1989
- Parenting With Wit and Wisdom in Times of Chaos and Loss 1999
- Parenting Through Crisis: Helping Kids in Times of Loss, Grief, and Change 2000 Best Seller
- Just Because It's Not Wrong Doesn't Make It Right 2006 Best Seller
