= Linda Polman =

Dutch journalist and author

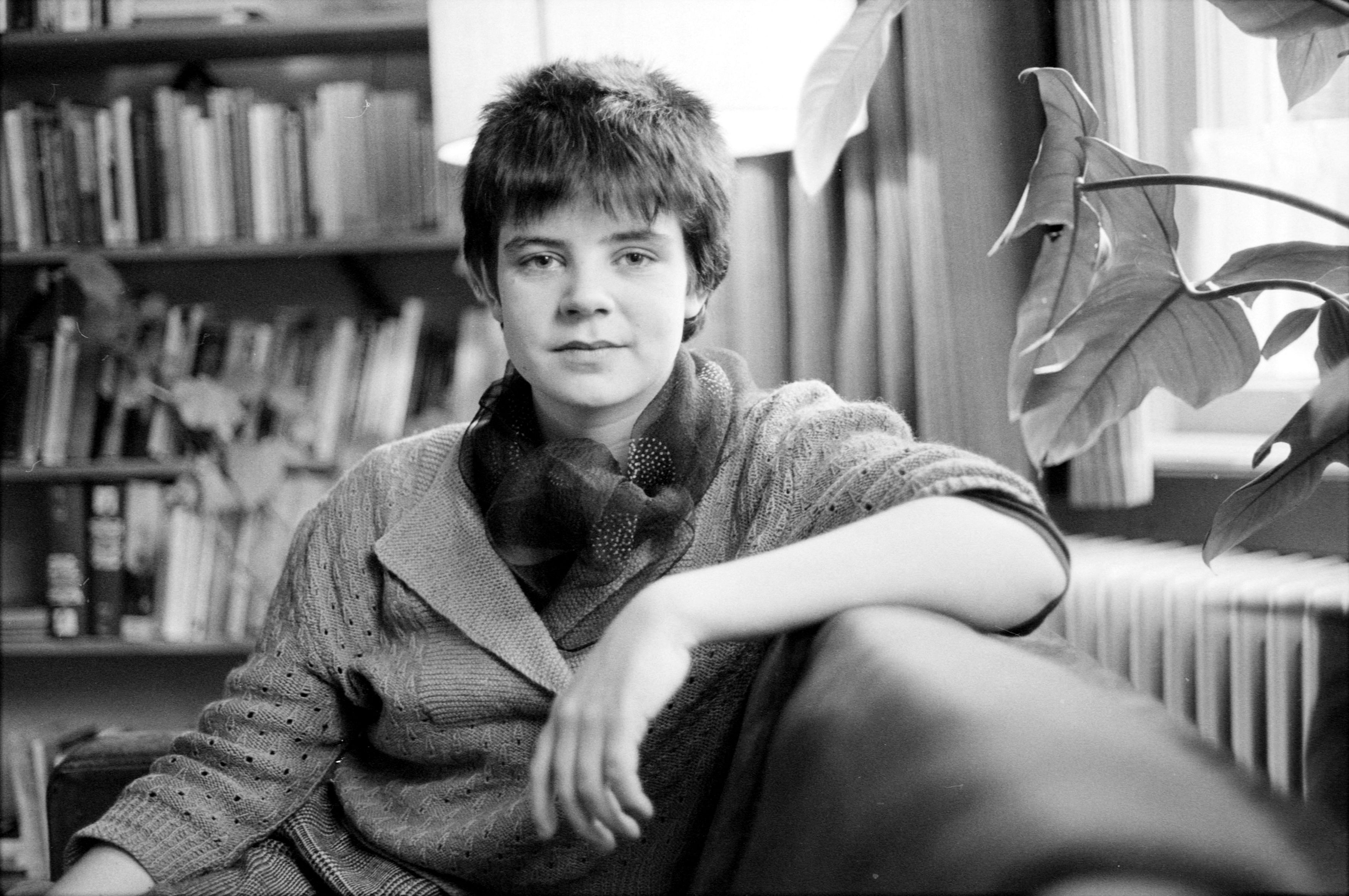
Linda Polman, 1983

Linda Polman (born 1958 in Amstelveen) is a Dutch freelance journalist and author of three books on humanitarian aid and intervention: We Did Nothing, War Games, and The Crisis Caravan.

== Author ==
=== We Did Nothing ===
Polman's book We Did Nothing: Why the Truth Doesn't Always Come Out When the UN Goes in was first published in 1997 in Dutch and later published in English.

Martin Woollacott reviewed the book along with the book A Problem from Hell by Samantha Power, for The Guardian. He concluded: "We have yet to work out properly how the post-twin towers interventions relate to those that went before. But there is obvious irony in the fact that while previously, as these books illustrate so clearly, determination was often lacking to deal with crises that most people agreed were serious, there was no shortage of it when the Bush administration moved to deal with a crisis on which there was no global consensus at all." The book was also reviewed by Hugh O'Shaugnessy in The Observer alongside Never Learn to Type: A Woman at the United Nations.

=== War Games ===
Polman's book War Games: The Story of Aid and War in Modern Times argued that humanitarian aid intervention often ended up fueling wars and making them worse. Her book cited the example of the Rwandan genocide, where humanitarian groups facilitated the flow of aid to Hutu militia who were involved with the killing, rather than the Tutsi who were genocide victims. Her work was discussed in The Guardian. The Humanitarian Policy Group at the Overseas Development Institute issued a written response to the book.

=== The Crisis Caravan ===
Polman's book The Crisis Caravan: What's Wrong with Humanitarian Aid? was reviewed in The Economist, Foreign Affairs, and the Huffington Post.

== Media appearances ==
Linda Polman has appeared on The Daily Show to discuss her book, The Crisis Caravan.
