= Henry A. Kissinger Prize =

- Awarded for: Exceptional contributions to transatlantic relations
- Location: Berlin, Germany
- Presented by: American Academy in Berlin
- First award: 2007
- Website: www.americanacademy.de/events/henry-a-kissinger-prize/

The Henry A. Kissinger Prize is awarded by the American Academy in Berlin for exceptional contributions to transatlantic relations. It was established in 2007 and named after U.S. politician Henry Kissinger (1923–2023), one of the American Academy's founding chairmen.

== Recipients ==
- 2007 Helmut Schmidt
- 2008 George H. W. Bush
- 2009 Richard von Weizsäcker
- 2010 Michael Bloomberg
- 2011 Helmut Kohl
- 2012 George P. Shultz
- 2013 Ewald-Heinrich von Kleist
- 2014 James A. Baker
- 2015 Giorgio Napolitano and Hans-Dietrich Genscher
- 2016 Samantha Power
- 2017 Wolfgang Schäuble
- 2018 John McCain
- 2020 Angela Merkel
- 2021 James Mattis
- 2022 Frank-Walter Steinmeier
- 2023 Jens Stoltenberg
- 2025 Kaja Kallas, Evika Siliņa and Ingrida Šimonytė
