= Administrator of the United States Agency for International Development =

Head of the United States Agency for International Development

- Seal of USAID

- Flag of USAID
- Member of: National Security Council Deputies Committee
- Nominator: President of the United States
- Formation: 1961
- Website: www.usaid.gov

The administrator of the United States Agency for International Development is the head of the United States federal government's Agency for International Development (USAID).

The administrator is officially nominated by the president of the United States and confirmed by the United States Senate. A 2017 reorganization of the US National Security Council placed the USAID administrator as a permanent member on the Deputies Committee.

== List of administrators ==
Denotes acting capacity.

No.	Name	Start	End	Duration	President(s)
1	Fowler Hamilton	October 3, 1961	December 7, 1962	1 year, 65 days	John F. Kennedy (1961–1963)
2	David Bell	December 21, 1962	July 31, 1966	3 years, 222 days	John F. Kennedy (1961–1963)
2	David Bell	December 21, 1962	July 31, 1966	3 years, 222 days	Lyndon B. Johnson (1963–1969)
3	William Gaud	August 3, 1966	January 10, 1969	2 years, 180 days	Lyndon B. Johnson (1963–1969)
4	John Hannah	April 2, 1969	October 7, 1973	4 years, 188 days	Richard Nixon (1969–1974)
5	Daniel Parker	October 31, 1973	January 19, 1977	3 years, 80 days	Richard Nixon (1969–1974)
5	Daniel Parker	October 31, 1973	January 19, 1977	3 years, 80 days	Gerald Ford (1974–1977)
6	Jack Gilligan	March 30, 1977	March 31, 1979	2 years, 1 day	Jimmy Carter (1977–1981)
7	Douglas Bennet	August 3, 1979	January 20, 1981	1 year, 170 days	Jimmy Carter (1977–1981)
8	Peter McPherson	February 27, 1981	August 7, 1987	6 years, 161 days	Ronald Reagan (1981–1989)
9	Alan Woods	December 1, 1987	June 29, 1989	1 year, 210 days	Ronald Reagan (1981–1989)
9	Alan Woods	December 1, 1987	June 29, 1989	1 year, 210 days	George H. W. Bush (1989–1993)
10	Ronald Roskens	March 22, 1990	December 1, 1992	2 years, 254 days	George H. W. Bush (1989–1993)
11	Brian Atwood	May 10, 1993	June 30, 1999	6 years, 51 days	Bill Clinton (1993–2001)
12	Brady Anderson	August 2, 1999	January 20, 2001	1 year, 171 days	Bill Clinton (1993–2001)
13	Andrew Natsios	May 1, 2001	January 14, 2006	4 years, 258 days	George W. Bush (2001–2009)
14	Randy Tobias	March 31, 2006	April 27, 2007	1 year, 27 days	George W. Bush (2001–2009)
15	Henrietta Fore	November 14, 2007	January 20, 2009	1 year, 67 days	George W. Bush (2001–2009)
–	Alonzo Fulgham; Acting	January 20, 2009	January 7, 2010	352 days	Barack Obama (2009–2017)
16	Raj Shah	January 7, 2010	February 19, 2015	5 years, 12 days	Barack Obama (2009–2017)
–	Alfonso Lenhardt; Acting	February 19, 2015	December 2, 2015	286 days	Barack Obama (2009–2017)
17	Gayle Smith	December 2, 2015	January 20, 2017	1 year, 49 days	Barack Obama (2009–2017)
–	Wade Warren; Acting	January 20, 2017	August 7, 2017	199 days	Donald Trump (2017–2021)
18	Mark Green	August 7, 2017	April 10, 2020	2 years, 247 days	Donald Trump (2017–2021)
–	John Barsa; Acting	April 13, 2020	January 20, 2021	282 days	Donald Trump (2017–2021)
–	Gloria Steele; Acting	January 20, 2021	May 2, 2021	102 days	Joe Biden (2021–2025)
19	Samantha Power	May 3, 2021	January 20, 2025	3 years, 262 days	Joe Biden (2021–2025)
–	Jason Gray; Acting	January 20, 2025	February 3, 2025	14 days	Donald Trump (2025–present)
–	Marco Rubio; Acting	February 3, 2025	August 29, 2025	207 days	Donald Trump (2025–present)
–	Russ Vought; Acting	August 29, 2025	November 24, 2025	87 days	Donald Trump (2025–present)
–	Eric Ueland; Acting	November 24, 2025	October 3, 2026	313 days	Donald Trump (2025–present)
–	Bill Woolf; Acting	October 3, 2026	Incumbent	42 days	Donald Trump (2025–present)

== See also ==
- United States Secretary of State
- Under Secretary of State for Foreign Assistance, Humanitarian Affairs, and Religious Freedom
