= Jason Gray (government official) =

American government official

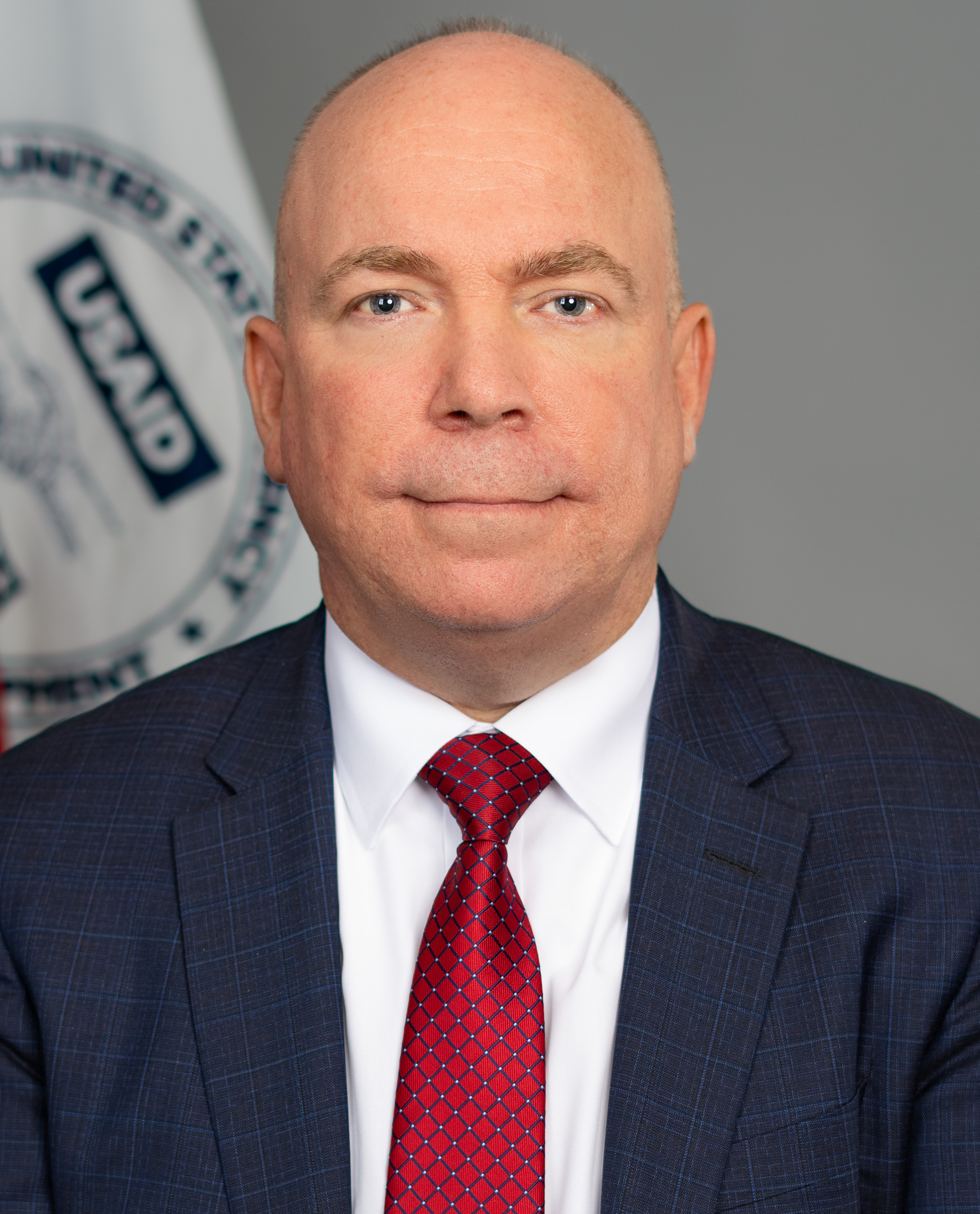

Administrator of the United States Agency for International Development
- Acting
- In office January 20, 2025 – February 3, 2025
- President: Donald Trump
- Preceded by: Samantha Power
- Succeeded by: Marco Rubio (acting)

Personal details
- Education: Colorado Technical University (MBA)

Jason Gray is an American government official who served as acting administrator of the United States Agency for International Development (USAID) from January 20 until February 3, 2025, and its chief information officer (CIO) since 2022. He was previously the CIO of the U.S. Department of Education from 2016 to 2022.

== Education ==
Gray earned a M.B.A. from Colorado Technical University. He also completed the Key Executive Leadership Certificate at American University. He holds professional certifications, including the Project Management Professional (PMP) and Certified Information Systems Security Professional (CISSP).

== Career ==
Gray's career began at Lockheed Martin, where he worked as a systems engineer and analyst before transitioning into a management role. He worked at Lockheed Martin for more than a decade.

Following his time at Lockheed Martin, Gray held roles in the healthcare sector. He served as chief information officer (CIO) of the Miami VA Healthcare System and as chief technology officer of the National Naval Medical Center. Gray was CIO at the Defense Manpower Data Center.

Gray later served as associate CIO at the U.S. Department of Transportation (DOT). At DOT, he managed an information technology (IT) portfolio valued at $3.5 billion and provided leadership on IT policy, information governance, compliance, and departmental policy.

In June 2016, Gray became the CIO of the U.S. Department of Education (ED). In this role, he oversaw $844 million in annual IT investments and managed an annual Office of the CIO operating budget of $121 million. During his tenure, the department moved from on-premises data centers to the cloud and collaborated with the Technology Modernization Fund Board to secure $20 million for the adoption of zero trust architecture. He managed IT operations supporting the department's loan portfolio, which exceeded $1 trillion. He remained in this role until his departure in August 2022.

On August 15, 2022, Gray became the CIO of the U.S. Agency for International Development (USAID). In that position, he served as the authorizing official for all USAID IT systems, the senior accountable official for supply chain risk management, and the co-chair of the IT steering subcommittee.

On January 20, 2025, Gray was named the acting administrator of USAID by the Donald Trump administration, without his prior knowledge. On January 27, the Department of Government Efficiency (DOGE) and Pete Marocco demanded that Gray put on leave 57 employees. Gray complied, though Marocco's belief that these employees had violated Trump's Executive Order 14169 appeared to misunderstand USAID's payment system and lacked evidence. On January 30, 2025, Marocco, backed by Elon Musk, requested that Gray shut off email and cellphone access for USAID personnel worldwide, including in conflict zones. Gray refused, arguing that it could get employees killed, for example during the evacuations from the Democratic Republic of the Congo. He was replaced the next day by Marco Rubio.

Political offices
Preceded by Samantha Power	Administrator of the United States Agency for International Development; Acting; 2025	Succeeded by Marco Rubio; Acting
