= Robert Sidey Shaw =

President of Michigan State University (1871–1953)

Robert Sidey Shaw (July 24, 1871 – February 7, 1953) was president of the Michigan State College of Agriculture and Applied Science (now Michigan State University) from 1928 to 1941. Dormitory Shaw Hall in the center of campus south of the Red Cedar River is named in his honor. His daughter, Sarah May Shaw, married John A. Hannah, who would succeed Shaw as president of the Michigan State College of Agriculture and Applied Science.

Academic offices
Preceded by Kenyon L. Butterfield	President of Michigan State College of Agriculture and Applied Science; 1928–1941	Succeeded by John A. Hannah
