= William Pickle =

Recipient of the Purple Heart medal (born 1950)

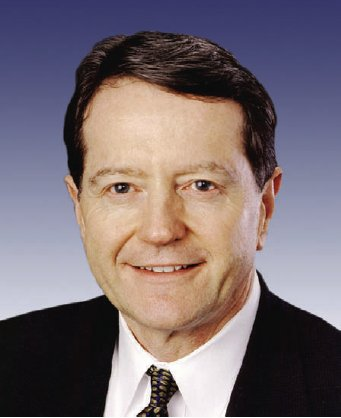

37th Sergeant at Arms and Doorkeeper of the United States Senate
- In office March 17, 2003 – January 4, 2007
- Leader: Bill Frist
- Preceded by: Alfonso Lenhardt
- Succeeded by: Terrance Gainer

Personal details
- Born: William Henry Pickle; February 14, 1950 (age 76) Roanoke, Virginia, U.S.
- Education: American University; Metro State College

Military service
- Allegiance: United States of America
- Branch/service: United States Army
- Years of service: 1968–1969
- Rank: Sergeant
- Unit: 1st Cavalry Division
- Battles/wars: Vietnam War
- Awards: Bronze Star Medal; Purple Heart; Air Medal (7)

William Henry Pickle (born February 14, 1950) was the 37th United States Senate Sergeant at Arms. He was sworn in on March 17, 2003, after a lifetime of public service, especially relating to the security of the institutions of the United States, and served until Terrance Gainer assumed the post in January, 2007.

Pickle served with the 1st Cavalry Division in the Vietnam War from 1968 to 1969 as an infantry sergeant and Medevac helicopter door gunner. Among his commendations are a Bronze Star, seven Air Medals, a Purple Heart, Army Commendation Medal, and the Combat Infantryman Badge.

Pickle attended American University and Metro State College in Denver, Colorado, and holds a degree in political science. He is married and has two children.

The bulk of Pickle's service, though, was with the U.S. Secret Service, where he moved up through the ranks over 26 years. Pickle was Deputy Assistant Director for Human Resources and Training, and Special Agent in Charge of the Vice Presidential Protective Division.

As Deputy Assistant Director for Human Resources and Training, Pickle dealt with human resources, training and personnel issues related to the agency. He was responsible for all Secret Service Training, including Protective Detail Training, firearms training, and physical training.

In his role as Special Agent in Charge of the Vice Presidential Protective Division, one of the largest divisions of the Secret Service, Pickle was responsible for all aspects of protection of Vice President Al Gore and his family. In this role, Pickle maintained daily contact with Gore and senior White House staff, and coordinated all aspects of security for Gore's 2000 Presidential campaign.

In 2002, Pickle was one of only two finalists President George W. Bush considered to hold the position of Director of the Secret Service.

Immediately prior to coming to the Senate, Pickle served as the Transportation Security Administration's first Federal Security Director with oversight for the federalization of Denver International Airport. In this position, he created a new organization of 2000 employees. Prior to this, he served as Deputy Inspector General for the United States Department of Labor, managing a communications, inspections and evaluations program.

Political offices
Preceded by Alfonso Lenhardt	37th Sergeant at Arms of the United States Senate; 2003 - 2007	Succeeded by Terrance Gainer
