= Alfonso Lenhardt =

American diplomat (born 1943)

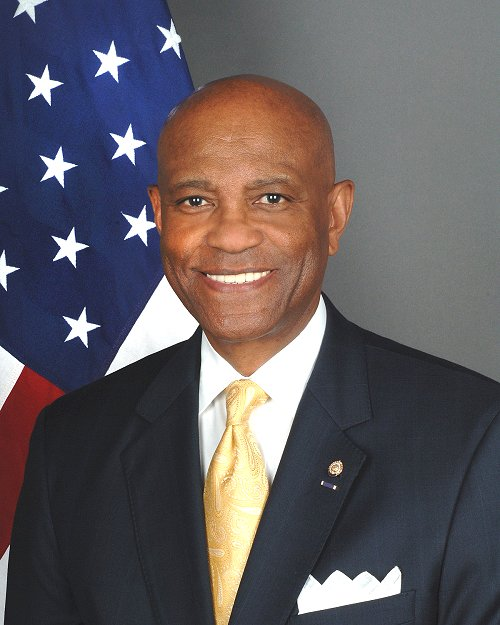
- Lenhardt in 2009

Administrator of the United States Agency for International Development
- Acting
- In office February 19, 2015 – December 2, 2015
- President: Barack Obama
- Preceded by: Rajiv Shah
- Succeeded by: Gayle Smith

United States Ambassador to Tanzania
- In office November 12, 2009 – October 9, 2013
- President: Barack Obama
- Preceded by: Mark Green
- Succeeded by: Mark B. Childress

36th Sergeant at Arms of the United States Senate
- In office September 4, 2001 – March 16, 2003
- Leader: Tom Daschle; Bill Frist
- Preceded by: James Ziglar
- Succeeded by: William Pickle

Personal details
- Born: October 29, 1943 (age 83) New York City, New York, U.S.
- Education: University of Nebraska (BS); Central Michigan University (MA); Wichita State University (MS)

Military service
- Allegiance: United States
- Branch/service: United States Army
- Years of service: 1965–1997
- Rank: Major General
- Battles/wars: Vietnam War
- Awards: Legion of Merit; Purple Heart; Bronze Star Medal

Alfonso E. Lenhardt (born October 29, 1943) is a retired United States Army major general who represented the United States as ambassador to Tanzania from 2009 to 2013. He was also accredited as the U.S. representative to the East African Community (EAC) in 2010. He left his post in October 2013. From 2001 to 2003, he served as Sergeant at Arms of the United States Senate. From 1965 to 1997, he had a distinguished military career in the U.S. Army, with multiple assignments to various parts of the world, retiring as a highly decorated Major General.

Born in New York City, Lenhardt earned a B.S. degree in Criminal Justice from the University of Nebraska. Lenhardt later received an M.A. degree in Public Administration from Central Michigan University and an M.S. degree in the Administration of Justice from Wichita State University.

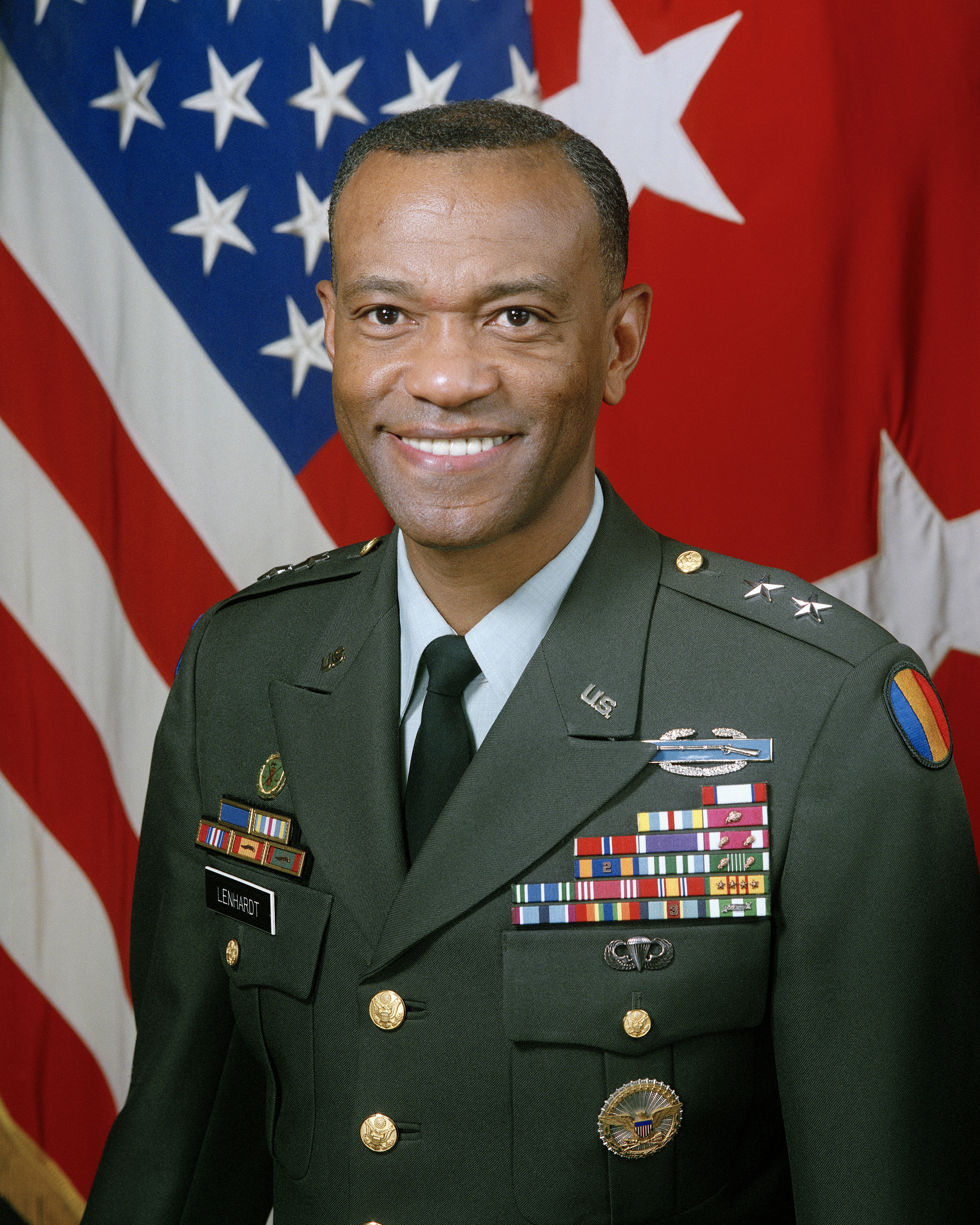
Maj. Gen. Lenhardt in 1994

Commissioned as an infantry officer in October 1966, Lenhardt commanded a platoon in Vietnam, earning a Bronze Star Medal, a Purple Heart and two Air Medals. After returning to the United States, he continued his career commanding and training military police detachments. Approved for promotion to major general in August 1993, he retired from active duty in August 1997. Among his other military honors were the Distinguished Service Medal, Defense Superior Service Medal, two awards of the Legion of Merit and three awards of the Meritorious Service Medal.

On September 18, 2014, Lenhardt was confirmed to be the Deputy Administrator of the Agency for International Development. Following the departure of USAID Administrator Rajiv Shah in February 2015, Lenhardt assumed the role of acting administrator. Gayle Smith, President Barack Obama's nominee to be Shah's permanent successor, was confirmed by the Senate on November 30, 2015, and assumed the role of administrator on December 2, 2015.

Cumulatively, Lenhardt served over 40 years in various government positions throughout his career. Beginning with his service as a young U.S. Army draftee in 1965, he had increasingly higher levels of responsibility and distinction in service to the Nation.

== Personal ==
In the 2024 United States presidential election, Lenhardt endorsed Kamala Harris.

== See also ==
- United States Ambassador to Tanzania
- Embassy of United States, Tanzania

Government offices
Preceded by James Ziglar	Sergeant at Arms of the United States Senate; 2001–2003	Succeeded by William Pickle
Diplomatic posts
Preceded by Mark Green	United States Ambassador to Tanzania; 2009–2013	Succeeded by Mark Childress
Political offices
Preceded by Rajiv Shah	Administrator of the United States Agency for International Development; Acting; 2015	Succeeded by Gayle Smith
