= Alonzo Fulgham =

American government official for USAID

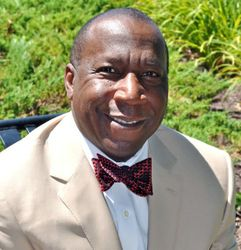

Acting Administrator of the United States Agency for International Development
- In office January 20, 2009 – January 7, 2010
- President: Barack Obama
- Preceded by: Henrietta H. Fore
- Succeeded by: Raj Shah

Personal details
- Education: Fisk University (BA); National Defense University (MA)

Alonzo Fulgham is an American international development executive, former federal official, and business leader. He served as Acting Administrator of the United States Agency for International Development in 2009 and has held senior leadership roles in government, international development, and the private sector.

Fulgham spent more than two decades at the U.S. Agency for International Development, where he held senior leadership positions including Mission Director in Afghanistan, Chief Operating Officer, and Acting Administrator.

Since leaving USAID, Fulgham has held senior private-sector roles at International Relief and Development, CH2M HILL, Galileo Energy Partners, VIATEQ Corporation, and Palladium, with work spanning international development, infrastructure, energy, cybersecurity, and public-private partnerships.

Fulgham has served in board and advisory roles for organizations including Palladium International, the American Academy of Diplomacy, CRDF Global, The Spy Museum, the Council on Foreign Relations, the Export-Import Bank of the United States Advisory Board, and the Carnegie Mellon University Center for International Relations and Politics. His prior board and advisory service has included the U.S. Millennium Challenge Corporation, the U.S. Overseas Private Investment Corporation, Pacific Architects and Engineers, Shared Interest, Meridian International, GRM International, Futures Group, Malaria No More, the William Davidson Institute, and the German Marshall Fund’s Transatlantic Aid Effectiveness Experts Group.

== Early life and education ==
Alonzo Fulgham was raised in the Dorchester neighborhood of Boston and graduated from Hyde Park High School in Boston. He was a stand-out varsity athlete and graduated in 1976. After high school he attended Fisk University in Nashville, Tennessee, where he received his Bachelor of Arts in business and economics and in 2001 obtained a Master of Arts from the National Defense University in Washington, DC.

== Career ==
Alonzo Fulgham began his career with the United States Agency for International Development (USAID) in 1986 and progressed through leadership roles for over two decades, culminating in his appointment as Acting Administrator by President Barack Obama in January 2009.

As Acting Administrator, Fulgham oversaw a USAID portfolio exceeding $20 billion across 88 countries and directed a workforce of more than 7,000 professionals.

Previously, as USAID's first Chief Operating Officer, Fulgham led agency modernization initiatives, strategic planning, civilian-military policy coordination, program and management reforms, and humanitarian assistance objectives.

Earlier, as USAID Mission Director in Afghanistan, Fulgham directed a $1.2 billion development and humanitarian assistance portfolio supporting infrastructure, emergency response, agriculture, reconstruction, education, health, democracy and governance, economic growth, and ex-combatant reintegration programs during a period of significant instability.^{[2]}

After concluding his service at USAID in 2010, Fulgham was named Vice President at International Relief and Development, where he worked on operations, business development, and strategic growth initiatives.

In July 2012, Fulgham was named Senior Vice President for Strategy and Sustainable International Development at CH2M HILL. In that role, he supported the firm’s international business interests in energy, infrastructure, water, environment, climate science, public health, and security, with a focus on emerging markets in the Asia-Pacific and African regions. He served in this capacity until late 2015 and later consulted for the organization.^{[2]}

In 2016, Fulgham became President of Galileo Energy Partners, BV, an integrated development and investment company focused on the energy and mining sectors in Africa. As president, he led efforts to consolidate the company’s holdings, strengthen strategic partnerships, and expand market opportunities in Africa and the Asia-Pacific region.^{[2]}

After three and a half years with Galileo, Fulgham departed in late 2019 to resume full-time consulting with the private consultancy he founded in 2012, TJM International Consultants (TJM), which operates within the field of international development, policy, planning and operations.

In March 2020, Fulgham joined VIATEQ Corporation as Executive Vice President for Defense and Homeland. After a 2-year period of serving as Managing Partner at Palladium, Fulgham resumed his current position as Executive Vice President at VIATEQ Corporation.

== Strategic Advisory Roles / Board Leadership ==
Fulgham currently serves on the Board of Directors for Palladium International, American Academy for Diplomacy, CRDF Global, The Spy Museum, The Council on Foreign Relations, The Export- Import Bank of the United States Advisory Board and the International Advisory Council of the Carnegie Mellon University Center for International Relations and Politics.

His prior board and advisory service has included the U.S. Millennium Challenge Corporation, the U.S. Overseas Private Investment Corporation, Pacific Architects and Engineers, Shared Interest, Meridian International, GRM International, Futures Group, Malaria No More, the William Davidson Institute, and the German Marshall Fund’s Transatlantic Aid Effectiveness Experts Group.^{[2]}

== Awards and Recognition ==
Fulgham received the Thursday Luncheon Group’s 2022 Pioneer Award. The group, founded in 1973, works to increase African American participation in the formulation, articulation, and implementation of United States foreign policy.

Fulgham established records as the first African American to hold several positions, including: the first African American Acting Administrator of USAID, the first African American to run the largest USAID program in the world (during his tenure as USAID Mission Director in Afghanistan), and the first African American Vice Chairman of the American Academy for Diplomacy.

Political offices
Preceded by Henrietta H. Fore	Administrator of the United States Agency for International Development; Acting; 2009–2010	Succeeded by Raj Shah
