= John A. Hannah =

American academic administrator

John Hannah
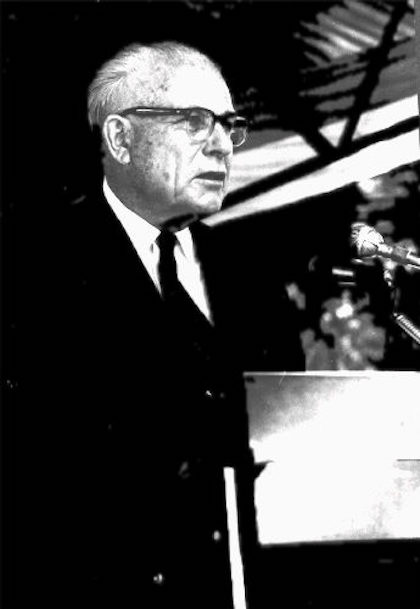
- Hannah at a USAID ceremony in 1969

4th Administrator of the United States Agency for International Development
- In office April 2, 1969 – October 7, 1973
- President: Richard Nixon
- Preceded by: William Gaud
- Succeeded by: Daniel Parker

Chair of the United States Commission on Civil Rights
- In office 1958–1969
- President: Dwight D. Eisenhower; John F. Kennedy; Lyndon B. Johnson; Richard Nixon
- Preceded by: Position established
- Succeeded by: Theodore Hesburgh

Assistant Secretary of Defense for Manpower and Personnel
- In office February 11, 1953 – July 31, 1954
- President: Dwight D. Eisenhower
- Preceded by: Anna Rosenberg
- Succeeded by: Carter L. Burgess

12th President of Michigan State University
- In office 1941–1969
- Preceded by: Robert Shaw
- Succeeded by: Walter Adams

Personal details
- Born: John Alfred Hannah; October 9, 1902 Grand Rapids, Michigan, U.S.
- Died: February 23, 1991 (aged 88) Kalamazoo, Michigan, U.S.
- Relatives: Robert Shaw (father-in-law)
- Education: Grand Rapids Community College (attended); Michigan State University (BS); University of Michigan (attended)
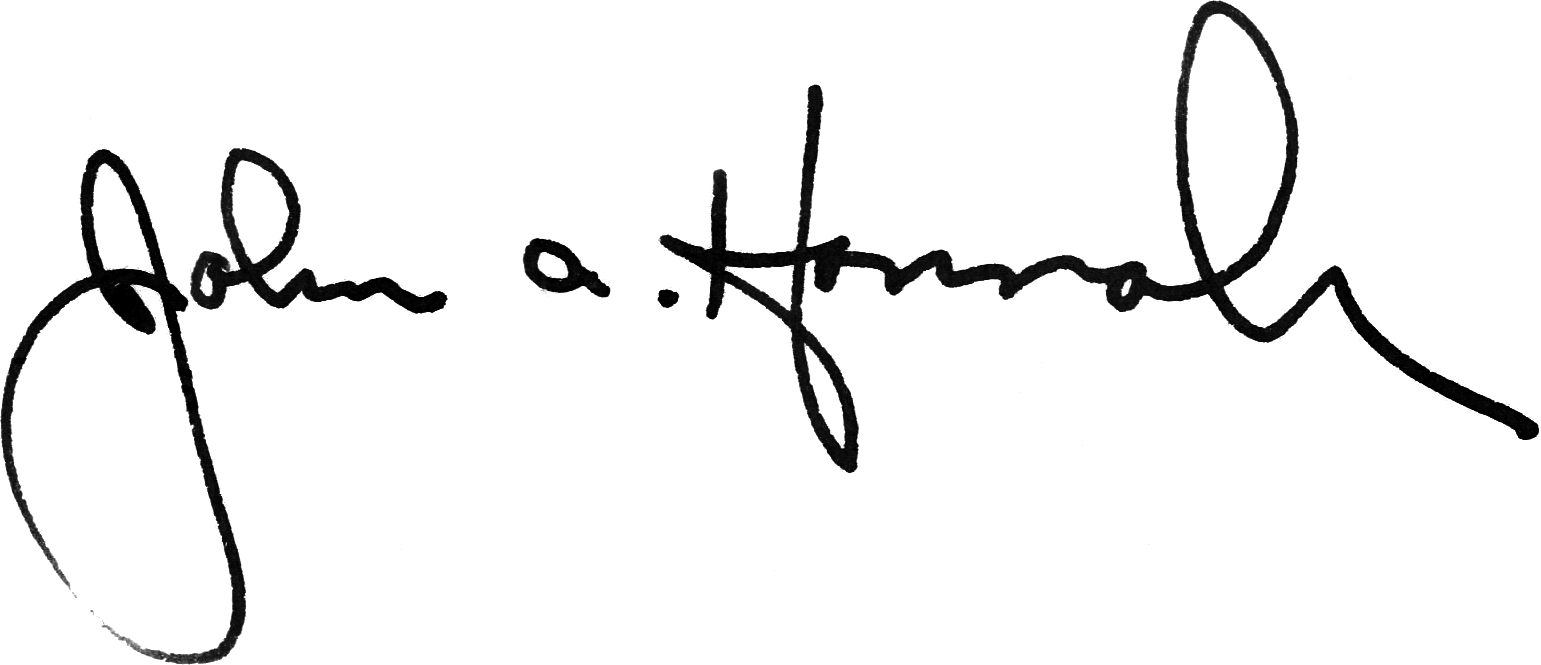
- Signature

John Alfred Hannah (October 9, 1902 – February 23, 1991) was president of Michigan State College (later Michigan State University) for 28 years (1941–1969), making him the longest serving of MSU's presidents. He is credited with transforming the school from a regional undergraduate college into a large national research institution. After his resignation from the university, Hannah became head of the United States Agency for International Development (USAID).

== Biography ==
A native of Grand Rapids, Hannah was most noted for expanding Michigan State from a respected regional undergraduate-oriented institution into a comprehensive national research university, and for helping to get Michigan State into the Big Ten Conference. He was also the first chairman of the United States Commission on Civil Rights. He attended Grand Rapids Community College, received his bachelor's in poultry science from Michigan State University, and studied at the University of Michigan Law School.

Hannah became president of Michigan State College in 1941. He thus began the largest expansion in the school's history, with the help of the 1945 G.I. Bill, which helped World War II veterans get an education. During this time the university grew by leaps and bounds to accommodate an ever-growing influx of students. One of Hannah's strategies was to build a new residence hall, enroll enough students to fill it, and use the income to start construction on a new dormitory. Under Hannah's plan, enrollment increased from 15,000 in 1950 to 38,000 in 1965.

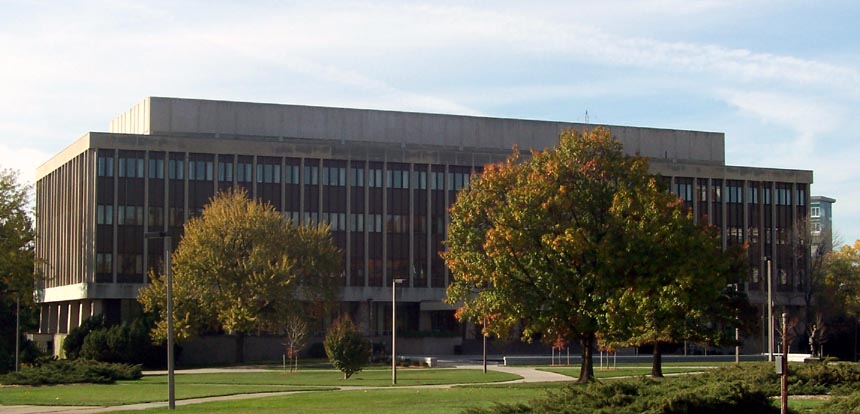
The Hannah Administration Building is named after Hannah.

While he worked on increasing the size of M.S.C.'s student body, Hannah also expanded the institution from a college of regional reputation into a nationally recognized research university. When the University of Chicago eliminated its athletics and resigned from what is now the Big Ten Conference in 1946, Hannah lobbied hard to take its place. The Big Ten finally admitted M.S.C. in 1950. Five years later, on the College's centennial year of 1955, the State of Michigan made it a university. In 1957 he continued M.S.U.'s expansion co-founding Michigan State University–Oakland (now Oakland University) with Matilda Dodge Wilson. The Hannah Hall of Science on Oakland University's campus is named for him. Michigan State University continued to expand throughout the 1960s, completing its newest dormitory in 1967. None have been built since.

By 1969, Vietnam-era protests had completely reshaped the university. Much of the controversy surrounded Hannah and the University's involvement in Vietnam with the Michigan State University Group (MSUG). Hannah was accused of being responsible for allowing the CIA to involve itself in MSUG. Hannah resigned to become the head of USAID.

== Legacy ==
The John A. Hannah Distinguished Professorship at Michigan State University was established in 1966.

As part of its sesquicentennial celebration, MSU erected a 7-foot bronze statue of Hannah in front of his namesake administration building on September 17, 2004, sculpted by California artist Bruce Wolfe.

Additionally, the football team retired the number 46 in honor of 46 years of service to the university.

Academic offices
Preceded by Robert Shaw	President of Michigan State University; 1941–1969	Succeeded by Walter Adams
Political offices
Preceded by Anna Rosenberg	Assistant Secretary of Defense for Manpower and Personnel; 1953–1954	Succeeded by Carter L. Burgess
New office	Chair of the United States Commission on Civil Rights; 1958–1969	Succeeded by Theodore Hesburgh
Preceded by William Gaud	Administrator of the United States Agency for International Development; 1969–1973	Succeeded by Daniel Parker
