= Daniel Parker (government official) =

American businessman (1925–1992)

Daniel Safford Parker

Administrator of the United States Agency for International Development
- In office October 31, 1973 – January 19, 1977
- Nominated by: Gerald Ford
- Preceded by: John A. Hannah
- Succeeded by: John J. Gilligan

Personal details
- Born: June 8, 1925 Chicago, Illinois, U.S.
- Died: January 28, 1992 (aged 66) Charleston, South Carolina, U.S.
- Party: Republican
- Education: Milton College (BS); Harvard Business School (MBA); American University (JD)

Daniel Parker (June 8, 1925 – January 28, 1992) was an American business owner. He served as the administrator of the United States Agency for International Development between 1973 and 1977. Prior to the USAID, he was an executive at the Parker Pen Company. He grew up in Janesville, Wisconsin.
