= Rajiv Shah =

American government official

Raj Shah
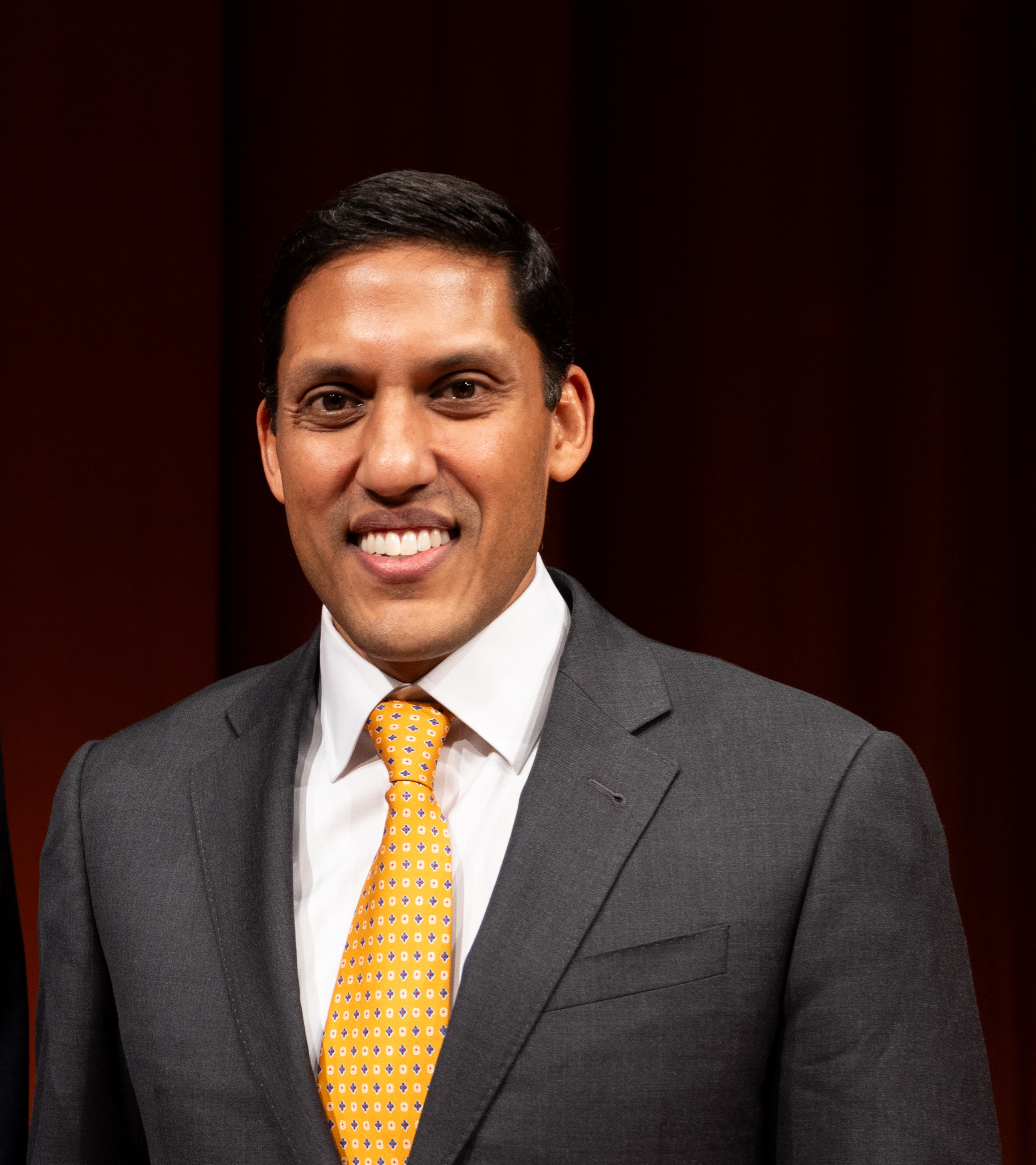
- Shah in 2024

13th President of the Rockefeller Foundation
- Incumbent
- Assumed office March 1, 2017
- Preceded by: Judith Rodin

16th Administrator of the United States Agency for International Development
- In office January 7, 2010 – February 19, 2015
- President: Barack Obama
- Preceded by: Alonzo Fulgham (acting)
- Succeeded by: Alfonso Lenhardt (acting)

Personal details
- Born: March 9, 1973 (age 53) Detroit, Michigan, U.S.
- Party: Democratic
- Spouse: Shivam Mallick
- Education: University of Michigan, Ann Arbor (BS); University of Pennsylvania (MS, MD)

Rajiv J. "Raj" Shah (born March 9, 1973) is an American physician. He is the president of the Rockefeller Foundation and a former government official and health economist who served as the sixteenth administrator of the United States Agency for International Development (USAID) from 2010 to 2015. Shah is the author of the book Big Bets: How Large-Scale Change Really Occurs, which was released by Simon Element on October 10, 2023.

== Early life and career ==
Shah was born to Indian Gujarati immigrant parents who settled in Ann Arbor, Michigan in the late 1960s. Shah is an adherent of the Hindu faith. He grew up in the Detroit area and attended Wylie E. Groves High School. He graduated from the University of Michigan with a B.S. in economics. He went on to University of Pennsylvania, where he earned an M.S. in health economics from the Wharton School of Business and an M.D. from the Perelman School of Medicine. Shah also studied abroad during his bachelor's at the London School of Economics, where he earned a general course certificate in economics. During the 2000 Gore-Lieberman Presidential Campaign, Shah was a health policy advisor and research associate. He also served as a member of Governor Ed Rendell's (D-PA) transition committee on health.

== The Gates Foundation ==
Shah joined the Bill & Melinda Gates Foundation in 2001, serving in a range of leadership roles including Director of Agricultural Development, Director of Strategic Opportunities, Deputy Director of Policy and Finance and Chief Economist.

Shah was also responsible for developing the International Finance Facility for Immunization, which raised more than $5 billion for the Global Alliance for Vaccines and Immunization (GAVI). IFFI has been recognized as an example of the power of innovative financing for global development.

== Obama administration ==
=== United States Department of Agriculture (USDA) ===
Shah was nominated by President Obama to serve as Chief Scientist and Undersecretary of Agriculture for Research, Education and Economics on April 17, 2009. He was confirmed unanimously by the United States Senate on May 12, 2009.

=== United States Agency for International Development (USAID) ===
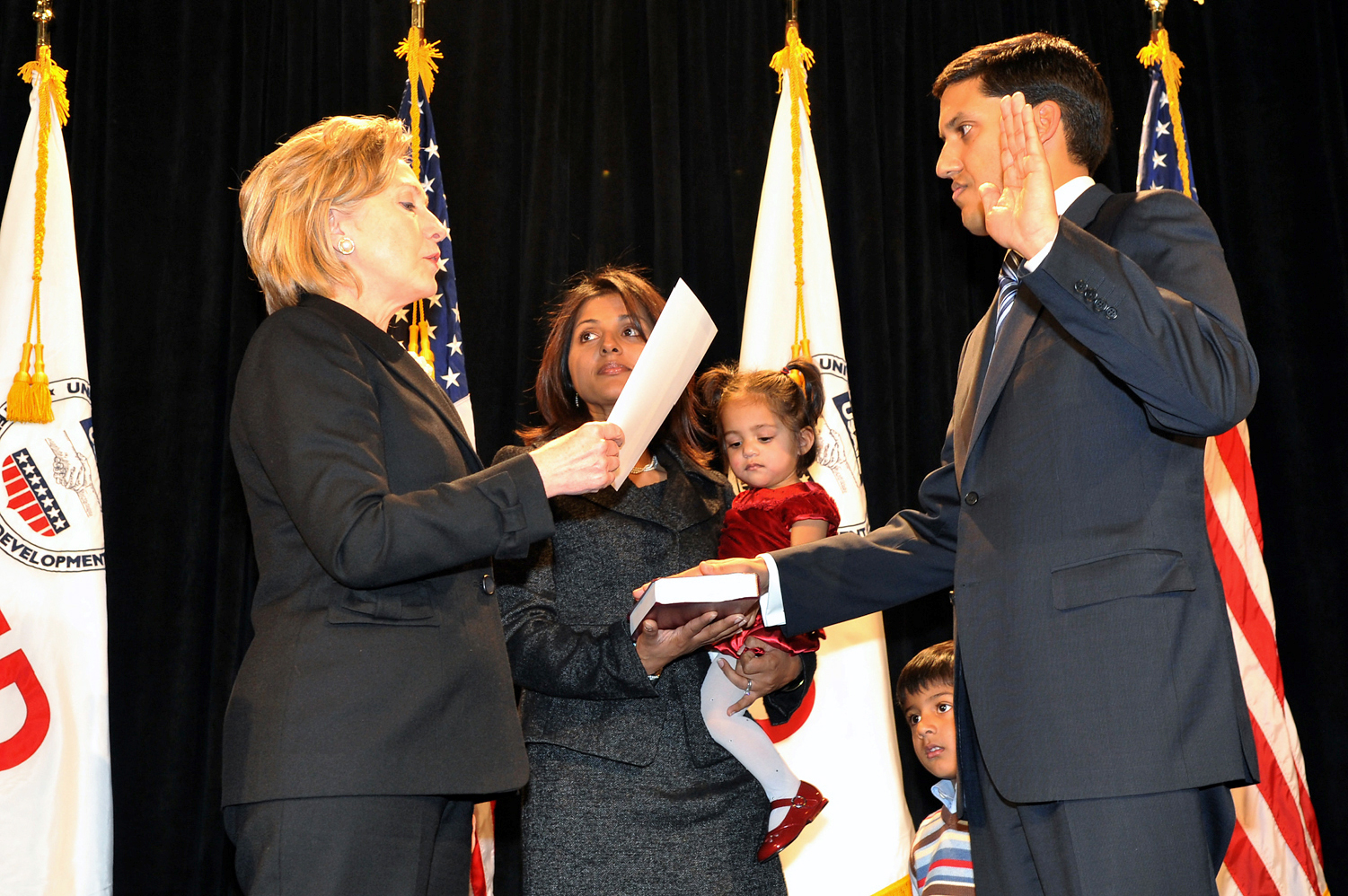
Shah takes the oath of office as Administrator of USAID, 2010

Shah was nominated to serve as the sixteenth administrator of USAID on November 10, 2009 and confirmed by the United States Senate unanimously on Christmas Eve, December 24, 2009. He was sworn into office by Secretary of State Hillary Rodham Clinton on January 7, 2010.

== Later career ==
After Shah resigned from USAID on January 30, 2015, he was appointed Distinguished Fellow in Residence at Georgetown University, Edmund A. Walsh School of Foreign Service, developing and teaching a graduate seminar on Rethinking Global Development and National Security policy with an emphasis on fragile states, data and innovation. He also founded and serves as Managing Partner for Latitude Capital, a global emerging markets power and infrastructure private equity firm.

=== United Nations High-Level Panel on the Global Response to Health Crises ===
In 2015, Shah was one of six global leaders appointed by United Nations Secretary General Ban Ki-moon to review the world's capacity to prepare for and respond to global pandemic threats. The panel presented their findings and recommendations to the Secretary General, UN General Assembly, and the G8 and G20 groups of leaders.

=== Moneyball for Government ===
Shah co-authored a bipartisan chapter in the second edition of the book Moneyball for Government with Michael Gerson, former assistant to the president for policy and strategic planning under President George W. Bush. The chapter, titled "Foreign Assistance and the Revolution of Rigor," calls for data and evidence to drive U.S. foreign aid and provides a roadmap for improving and sustaining foreign assistance programs.

== The Rockefeller Foundation ==
On January 5, 2017, the board of trustees announced the unanimous selection of Shah to serve as the thirteenth president of the Rockefeller Foundation. He assumed office on March 1, 2017, succeeding Dr. Judith Rodin, who had served as president for nearly twelve years. Shah is the first-ever Indian-American to serve as president of the foundation. The mission of the Foundation is to improve the lives of humanity around the world.

== Book ==
Shah authored the book Big Bets: How Large-Scale Change Really Occurs, which was released by Simon Element on October 10, 2023. The book focuses on his career and his perspective on effective organizational change.

== Awards and recognition ==
Shah has been the recipient of numerous awards including the Secretary of State's Distinguished Service Award (2013); the Pravasi Bharatiya Samman Award, the highest official honor for non-resident Indian, awarded by the President of India (2011); the U.S. Global Leadership Council Tribute Award (2014); and the Gene White Lifetime Achievement Award for Child Nutrition (2014).

Shah has been awarded numerous honorary degrees including American University, Doctor of International Affairs (2012), Tuskegee University, Doctor of Science (2012), and Colby College, Doctor of Laws (2011).

- 2020 Thomas Jefferson Foundation Medalist in Citizen Leadership
- 2023 Time Climate 100 List

== Board and affiliations ==
Shah currently sits on numerous boards including the Rockefeller Foundation, International Rescue Committee, Chicago Council on Global Affairs, Results for America, Trilateral Commission, the Atlantic Council and the National Geographic Society. He is also a member on the Council of Foreign Relations. On January 4, 2017 he was elected President of the Rockefeller Foundation, the first Indian-American to hold that post. Shah is a member of the Defense Policy Board Advisory Committee.

== Personal life ==
Shah is married to Shivam Mallick Shah. They have three children and currently reside in Washington, D.C.

Political offices
Preceded by Alonzo Fulgham; Acting	Administrator of the United States Agency for International Development; 2010–2015	Succeeded by Alfonso Lenhardt; Acting
