= Daniel Parker (priest) =

The Ven Daniel Thomas Parker was Archdeacon of Winnipeg from 1932 until his death on 6 May 1945.

Parker was born in Lakefield, Quebec, educated at McGill University and ordained in 1904. He was a curate at Holy Trinity, Winnipeg until 1909. He then held incumbencies at St John, Elgin, Manitoba; and Portage la Prairie.
