= A Problem from Hell =

Book by Samantha Power

- Author: Samantha Power
- Subject: Genocide, U.S. foreign policy
- Genre: Nonfiction
- Publisher: Basic Books
- Publication date: February 20, 2002
- Publication place: United States
- Media type: Hardcover
- Pages: 640
- ISBN: 978-0465061501
- Followed by: Chasing the Flame: Sergio Vieira de Mello and the Fight to Save the World

"A Problem from Hell": America and the Age of Genocide (2002) is a book by the Irish-American journalist Samantha Power, at that time Professor of Human Rights Practice at Harvard's John F. Kennedy School of Government, which explores the United States's understanding of, response to, and inaction on genocides in the 20th century, from the Armenian genocide to the "ethnic cleansings" of the Kosovo War. It won the J. Anthony Lukas Book Prize and the Pulitzer Prize for General Nonfiction in 2003.

Power observes that American policymakers have been consistently reluctant to condemn mass atrocities as genocide or to take responsibility for leading an international military intervention. She argues that without significant pressure from the American public, policymakers have avoided the term "genocide" altogether, which came into more widespread use after the Holocaust of World War II. Instead, they appeal to the priority of national interests or argue that a U.S. response would be futile and accelerate violence, as a justification for inaction. She thinks such justifications are usually ill-founded.

== Summary ==
Power begins with an outline of the international response to the Armenian genocide (Chapter 1). She next describes Raphael Lemkin's efforts to lobby for American action against Nazi atrocities in Europe (Chapter 2). She expands on the difficulties encountered by individuals who tried to convince US representatives and other members of the Allied Powers to recognize the Holocaust. She says this difficulty was compounded by the Allies focus on World War II and suggests that much indifference was based in antisemitic attitudes (Chapter 3).

She recounts how Lemkin brought genocide to the forefront of foreign policy issues after the war, leading to the 1948 U.N. Convention on the Prevention and Punishment of the Crime of Genocide. Lemkin had mounting disappointments and multiplying adversaries until his death in 1959. Senator William Proxmire (D-Wisconsin) and others took over fighting for preventing genocides and encouraging US leadership on this issue. Senator Proxmire and Republican President Ronald Reagan worked to gain support during his administration for the ratification of the Genocide Convention (Chapter 7). In the rest of the book, she focuses on genocides in individual nations and the U.S. response to such crises in Algeria, Cambodia, Iraq, Bosnia, Rwanda, and Kosovo.

== Reception ==
=== Reviews ===
Martin Woollacott reviewed the book, along with We Did Nothing by Linda Polman, for The Guardian. He concluded:

"We have yet to work out properly how the post-twin towers interventions relate to those that went before. But there is obvious irony in the fact that while previously, as these books illustrate so clearly, determination was often lacking to deal with crises that most people agreed were serious, there was no shortage of it when the Bush administration moved to deal with a crisis on which there was no global consensus at all."

Stephen Holmes reviewed the book, along with War in a Time of Peace: Bush, Clinton and the Generals by David Halberstam, for the London Review of Books. Holmes wrote:

"Putting an end to atrocities is a moral victory. But if the intervening force is incapable of keeping domestic support back home for the next phase, for reconstructing what it has shattered, the morality of its intervention is ephemeral at best. If political stability could be achieved by toppling a rotten dictator or if nations could be built at gunpoint, this problem would not be so pressing. Human rights cannot be reliably protected unless a locally sustained political authority is in place."

Charles V. Peña, then affiliated with the Cato Institute, reviewed the book for Reason, concluding:

"That is exactly the point of Power’s compelling narrative: The horror and tragedy of genocide is a moral issue that transcends national interest. But to prevent another Rwanda, the United States must also have the wisdom to avoid another Somalia."

Laura Secor reviewed the book for The New York Times. The book was also reviewed in Publishers Weekly.

=== Awards ===
- Pulitzer Prize for General Nonfiction
- Robert F. Kennedy Center for Justice and Human Rights Book Award
- J. Anthony Lukas Book Prize
- National Book Critics Circle Award for General Nonfiction
- Raphael Lemkin Award (Institute for the Study of Genocide)

=== Aftermath ===
Power faced criticism for her silence amidst the Gaza genocide during her time as an official in the Biden administration. In 2026, international relations theorist John Mearsheimer described this silence as "truly remarkable" given her "very important" work on genocide in A Problem from Hell. He cited Power as the paramount example of the stifling of free speech in American public life by pro-Israel lobbyists, speculating that her silence was driven by an implicit threat to her career in politics.
