= Daniel Parker (silversmith) =

American silversmith

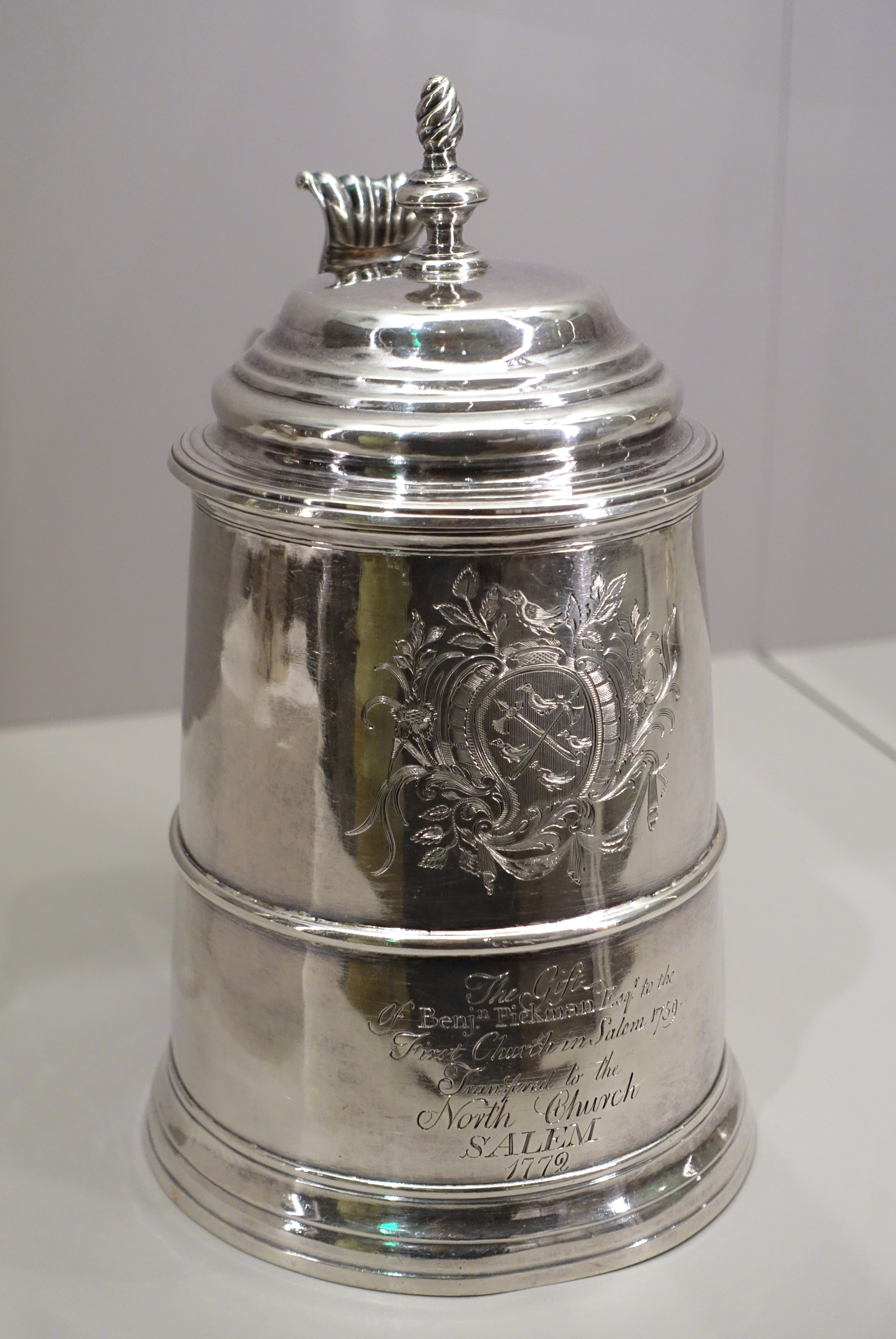
The Benjamin Pickman Tankard by Daniel Parker, c. 1759

Daniel Parker (November 20, 1726 - December 31, 1785) was an American silversmith, active in Boston.

== Life ==
Parker was born in Charlestown, Massachusetts to Isaac and Grace (Hall) Parker, where he married Margaret Jarvis on October 8, 1751. From 1748-1775 he worked as a gold- and silversmith in Boston, where he advertised 1750-1770 in the Boston Gazette as a goldsmith. He also advertised a theft in the Gazette, 1759, of " "Three large Silver Spoons stamp'd D.Parker, 12 Tea Spoons, most of them stamp'd D.P., 3 pair Silver Tea Tongs, not stamp'd, one large Gold Locket ... 14 pair large open-work'd Silver Shoe Buckles with Steel Chapes....". He subsequently advertised in 1761 that he was robbed again, and reported the availability of jewelry and goldsmiths' tools from "his Shop near the Golden Ball." From 1763-1767 he advertised his Union Street address and that his tools included "Forging & raising anvils for tankards, canns & creampots," and "Death head & heart in hand ring swages." Apparently he also worked around 1775 as a gold- and silversmith in Salem, Massachusetts.

Parker's works are collected in the Harvard University Art Museums, Museum of Fine Arts, Boston, and Yale University Art Gallery.
