= Samantha Power =

American academic, author, and diplomat (born 1970)

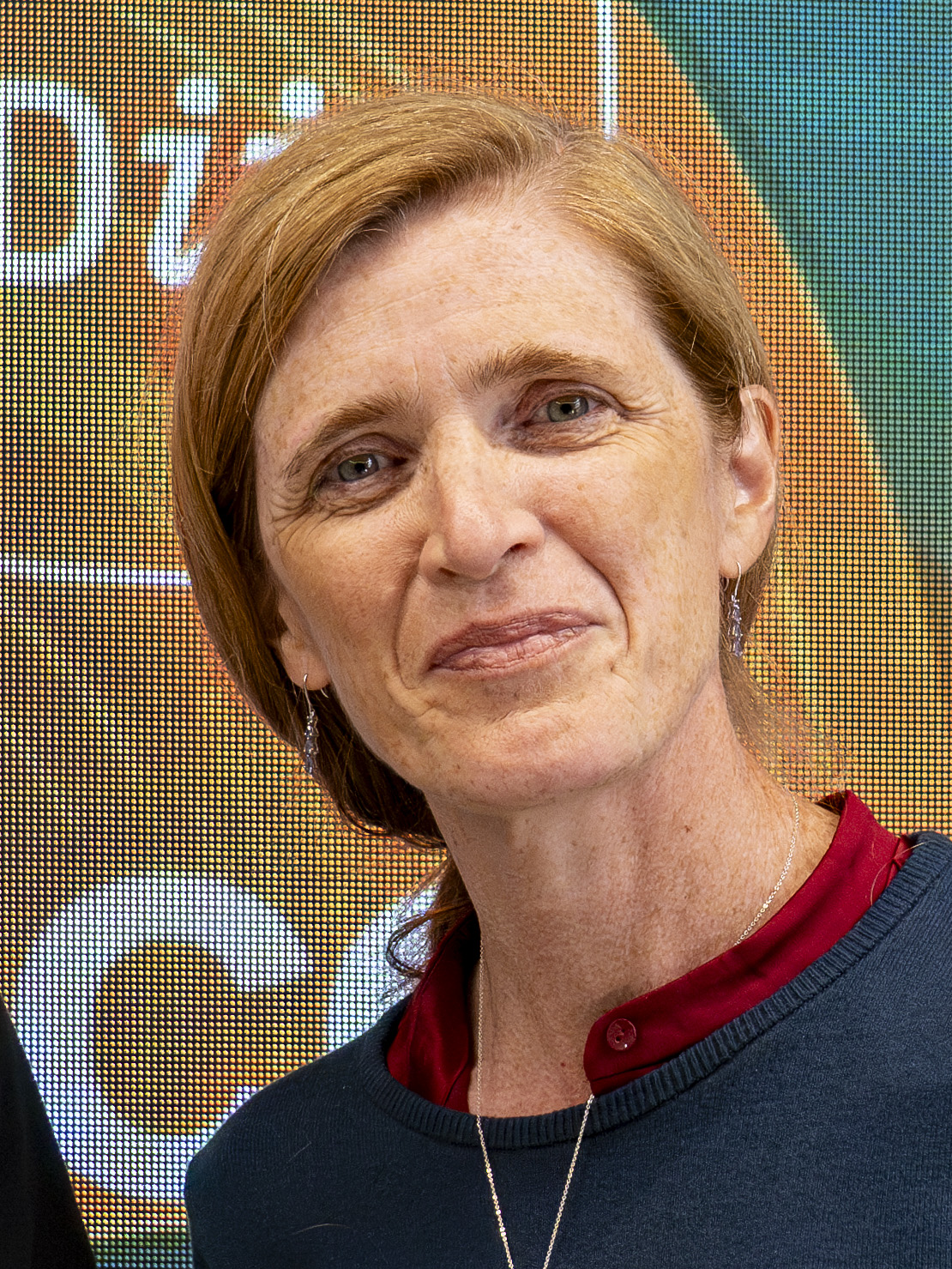
- Power in 2023

19th Administrator of the United States Agency for International Development
- In office May 3, 2021 – January 20, 2025
- President: Joe Biden
- Preceded by: Gloria Steele (acting)
- Succeeded by: Jason Gray (acting)

28th United States Ambassador to the United Nations
- In office August 5, 2013 – January 20, 2017
- President: Barack Obama
- Deputy: Rosemary DiCarlo; Michele J. Sison
- Preceded by: Rosemary DiCarlo (acting)
- Succeeded by: Nikki Haley

Personal details
- Born: Samantha Jane Power; September 21, 1970 (age 56) London, England
- Party: Democratic
- Spouse: Cass Sunstein (m. 2008)
- Children: 2
- Education: Yale University (BA); Harvard University (JD)
- Awards: Pulitzer Prize for General Nonfiction (2003)

Samantha Jane Power (born September 21, 1970) is an Irish-American journalist, diplomat, and government official who served as the United States ambassador to the United Nations from 2013 to 2017. A member of the Democratic Party, Power served as the administrator of the United States Agency for International Development from 2021 to 2025.

Power began her career as a war correspondent covering the Yugoslav Wars before entering academic administration. In 1998, she became the Founding Executive Director of the Carr Center for Human Rights Policy at Harvard Kennedy School, where she later served as the first Anna Lindh Professor of Practice of Global Leadership and Public Policy until 2009. She was a senior adviser to Senator Barack Obama until March 2008.

Power joined the Obama State Department transition team in late November 2008. She served as Special Assistant to the President and Senior Director for Multilateral Affairs and Human Rights on the National Security Council from January 2009 to February 2013. In April 2012, Obama chose her to chair a newly formed Atrocities Prevention Board. As United Nations ambassador, Power's office focused on such issues as United Nations reform, women's rights and LGBT rights, religious freedom and religious minorities, refugees, human trafficking, human rights, and democracy, including in the Middle East and North Africa, Sudan, and Myanmar. A longtime advocate of armed intervention by the United States in opposition to atrocities abroad, she is considered to have been a key figure in the Obama administration in persuading the president to intervene militarily in Libya.

Power is a subject of the 2014 documentary Watchers of the Sky, which explains the contribution of several notable people, including Power, to the cause of genocide prevention. She won a Pulitzer Prize in 2003 for her book A Problem from Hell: America and the Age of Genocide, a study of the U.S. foreign policy response to genocide. She was awarded the 2015 Barnard Medal of Distinction and the 2016 Henry A. Kissinger Prize. Power's research has been criticized by some in the genocide studies field due to her underlying assumption that the United States was a bystander, as opposed to perpetrator or enabler, of genocide. In 2016, she was listed as the 41st-most powerful woman in the world by Forbes.

== Early life and education ==
Power was born in London, the daughter of Irish parents Vera Delaney, a nephrologist and field hockey player, and Jim Power, a dentist and piano player. Raised in Ireland until she was nine, Power lived in the Dublin district of Castleknock and was schooled in Mount Anville Montessori Junior School, Goatstown, Dublin, until her mother separated from her father and immigrated to Pittsburgh, Pennsylvania, in 1979. She has recalled reading Enid Blyton and Nancy Drew mystery novels while accompanying her father to a local pub in Dublin. She recalled: "It was not, clearly, an ideal environment for a child. On the other hand, my father was always just a few steps away, and we were very close, and he was very loving and very present, notwithstanding where it was he was being present."

She attended Lakeside High School in Atlanta, Georgia, where she was a member of the cross country team and the basketball team. She subsequently received her B.A. degree in history from Yale University, where she was a member of Aurelian Honor Society and a reporter for the Yale Daily News, and her J.D. degree from Harvard Law School.

== Career ==
After graduating from Yale, Power worked at the Carnegie Endowment for International Peace as a researcher for Carnegie's then-President Morton Abramowitz. From 1993 to 1996, she worked as a war correspondent, covering the Yugoslav Wars for U.S. News & World Report, The Boston Globe, The Economist, and The New Republic. When she returned to the United States, she attended Harvard Law School, receiving her J.D. in 1999. The following year, her first edited work, Realizing Human Rights: Moving from Inspiration to Impact (edited with Graham Allison) was published. Her first book, A Problem from Hell: America and the Age of Genocide, grew out of a paper she wrote while attending law school; it helped create the doctrine of responsibility to protect. The book won the Pulitzer Prize for General Nonfiction and the J. Anthony Lukas Book Prize in 2003. Power's book framed genocide as a problem that the United States was involved in as an onlooker rather than a perpetrator or enabler. She has been a longtime advocate of the use of armed force by the United States in response to genocide abroad.

In 2004, Power was named by Time magazine as one of the 100 most influential people in the world that year. In fall 2007, she began writing a regular column for Time.

Power spent 2005–06 working in the office of U.S. Senator Barack Obama as a foreign policy fellow, where she was credited with sparking and directing Obama's interest in the Darfur conflict. She served as a senior foreign policy adviser to Obama's 2008 presidential campaign, but resigned during the primaries. In 2009 President Obama appointed her to a position on the National Security Council and in 2013 he appointed her as U.S. Ambassador to the United Nations, a cabinet-rank position. In 2025, Power started teaching at the Harvard Kennedy School and Harvard Law School.

== 2008 Obama presidential campaign ==
Power was an early and outspoken supporter of Barack Obama. When she joined the Obama campaign as a foreign policy advisor, Men's Vogue described her as a "Harvard brainiac who can boast both a Pulitzer Prize and a mean jump shot (ask George Clooney). Now the consummate outsider is working on her inside game: D.C. politics."

In August 2007, Power wrote a memo titled "Conventional Washington versus the Change We Need", in which she provided one of the first comprehensive statements of Obama's approach to foreign policy. In the memo, she comments: "Barack Obama's judgment is right; the conventional wisdom is wrong. We need a new era of tough, principled and engaged American diplomacy to deal with 21st-century challenges."

"Armenians for Obama" uploaded a video of Power to YouTube where she referred to Obama's "unshakeable conscientiousness" regarding genocide in general and the Armenian genocide in particular, as well as saying that he would "call a spade a spade, and speak the truth about it".

Power appeared on BBC's HARDtalk on March 6, stating that Barack Obama's pledge to "have all U.S. combat brigades out of Iraq within 16 months" was a "best case scenario" that "he will revisit when he becomes president." Challenged by the host as to whether this contradicted Obama's campaign commitment, she responded, "You can't make a commitment in March 2008 about what circumstances will be like in January 2009. ... He will, of course, not rely on some plan that he's crafted as a presidential candidate or a U.S. Senator. He will rely upon a plan—an operational plan—that he pulls together in consultation with people who are on the ground to whom he doesn't have daily access now, as a result of not being the president." She concluded by saying that "what we can take seriously is that he will try to get U.S. forces out of Iraq as quickly and responsibly as possible." In February 2009, Obama announced that the U.S. would end combat operations in Iraq by August 31, 2010, and withdraw all U.S. soldiers by the end of 2011. The U.S. formally ended its mission in Iraq on December 15 of that year.

=== Resignation from the campaign ===
In a March 6, 2008, interview with The Scotsman, she said:

We fucked up in Ohio. In Ohio, they are obsessed and Hillary is going to town on it, because she knows Ohio's the only place they can win. She is a monster, too—that is off the record—she is stooping to anything ... if you are poor and she is telling you some story about how Obama is going to take your job away, maybe it will be more effective. The amount of deceit she has put forward is really unattractive.

Power apologized for the remarks on the night of the March 6 interview, saying that they "do not reflect my feelings about Senator Clinton, whose leadership and public service I have long admired", and telling Irish TV reporter Michael Fisher: "Of course I regret them. I can't even believe they came out of my mouth. ... in every public appearance I've ever made talking about Senator Clinton, I have sung her praises as the leader she has been, the intellect. She's also incredibly warm, funny. ... I wish I could go back in time." The next day, in the wake of reaction to the remarks, she resigned from the Obama campaign. Soon afterward, The Weekly Standard said that it "might have been the most ill-starred book tour since the invention of movable type."

Following her resignation, she also appeared on The Colbert Report on March 17, 2008, saying, "can I just clarify and say, I don't think Hillary Clinton is a monster ... we have three amazing candidates left in the race." When Power later joined the State Department transition team, an official close to the transition said Power had apologized and that her "gesture to bury the hatchet" with Clinton had been well received.

== Obama Administration ==
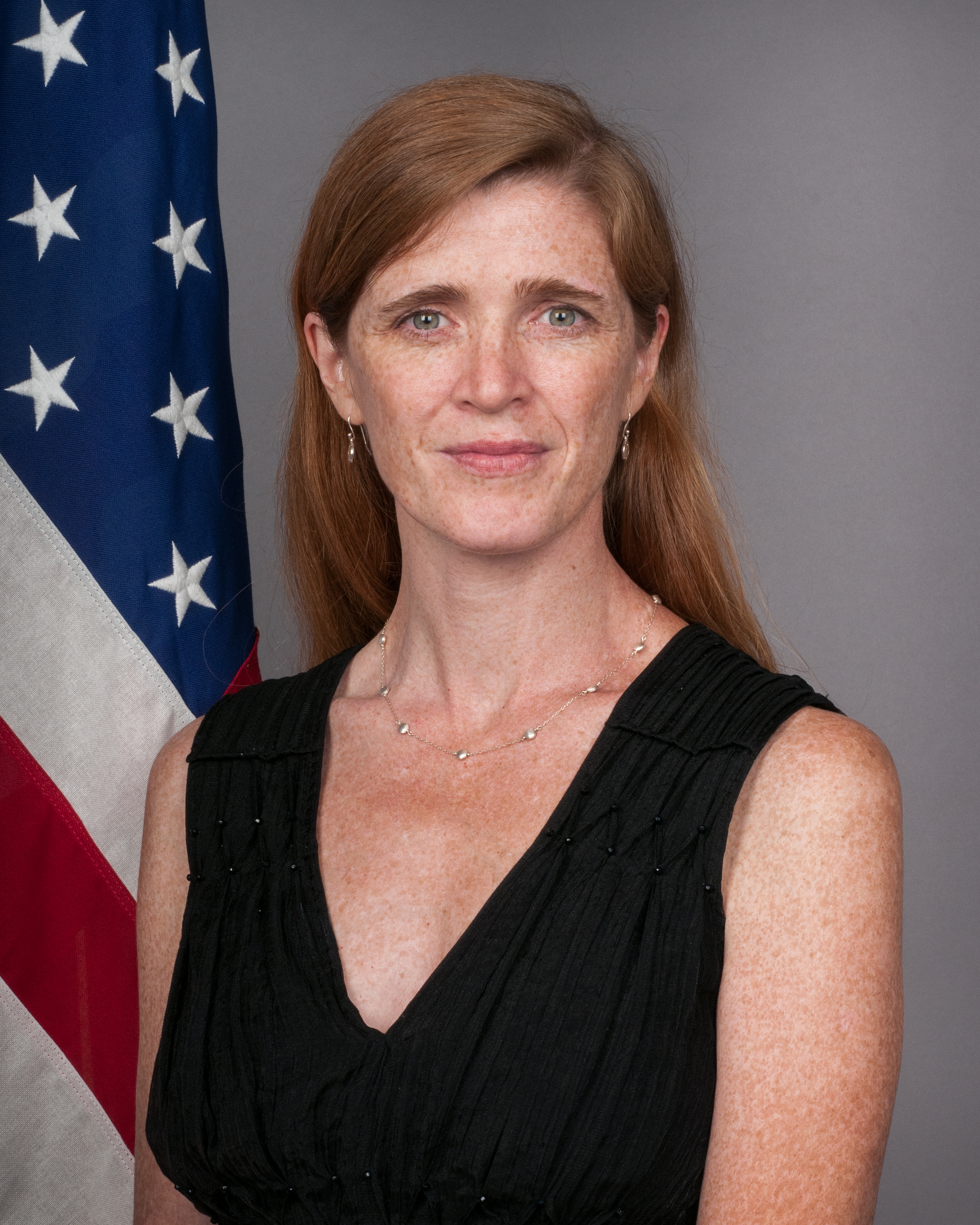
Power's first portrait as US Ambassador

After the 2008 presidential election, Power joined president-elect Obama's State Department transition team.

=== National Security Council ===
In January 2009, President Obama appointed Power to the National Security Council, where she served as a Special Assistant to the President and Senior Director for Multilateral Affairs and Human Rights.

In this capacity, Power kept the U.S. out of the Durban Review Conference, the 2009 iteration of the UN World Conference against Racism, which in 2001 was criticized for descending into "a festival of Israel bashing".

Within the Obama administration, Power advocated for military intervention in Libya during the Libyan Civil War on humanitarian grounds. With then-Secretary of State Hillary Clinton and UN ambassador Susan Rice, Power lobbied Obama to pursue a UN Security Council resolution authorizing an international coalition force to protect Libyan civilians.

Power left the National Security Council in February 2013.

=== U.S. Ambassador to the United Nations ===
==== Nomination and confirmation ====
On June 5, 2013, President Obama announced her nomination as the new United States Ambassador to the United Nations.

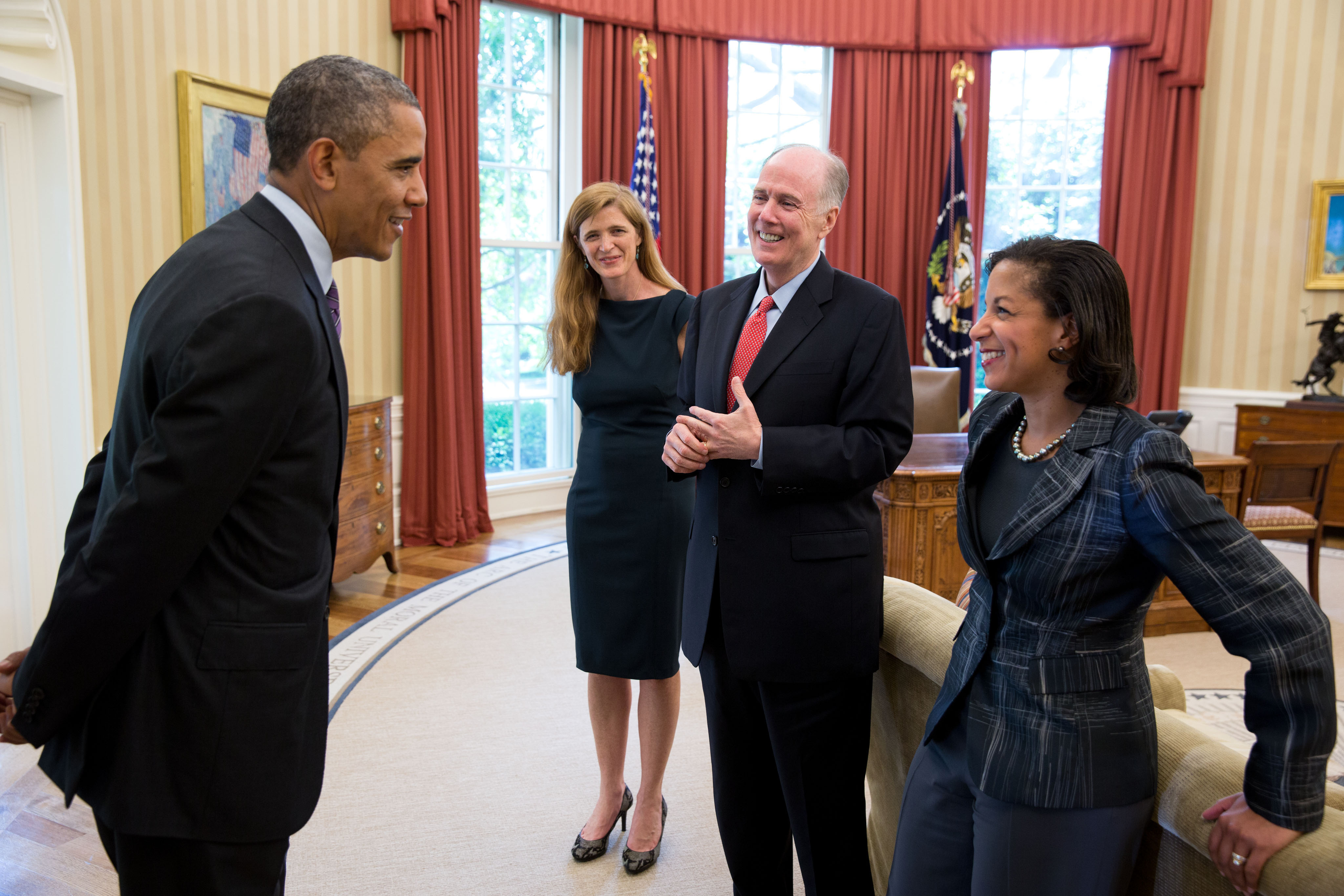
Power with President Barack Obama in the Oval Office on June 5, 2013

Republican senators John McCain and Lindsey Graham backed Power's nomination, as did independent senator Joseph Lieberman. Power also received support from U.S. diplomat Dennis Ross, the national director of the Anti-Defamation League Abraham Foxman, Israel's ambassador to the U.S. Michael Oren, lawyer and commentator Alan Dershowitz, the director of the Institute for Justice & Democracy in Haiti, the director of the Israel Project, the Jewish Council for Public Affairs, the President of the Rabbinical Assembly, the Eastern Director of the Simon Wiesenthal Center Rabbi Steven Burg, the National Jewish Democratic Council, Rabbi Shmuley Boteach, publisher Marty Peretz, and military writer Max Boot.

Her nomination also faced some opposition. Former U.S. ambassador to the UN John R. Bolton and a former acting Assistant Secretary of Defense for International Security Affairs, Frank Gaffney, criticized her for a 2003 article she authored in The New Republic, in which Bolton claims she compared the United States to Nazi Germany.

Power was confirmed as UN ambassador by the U.S. Senate on August 1, 2013, by a vote of 87 to 10, and was sworn in a day later by the Vice President.

==== Criticism ====
Power's advocacy of deploying the United States armed forces to combat human rights abuses has been criticized as running contrary to the idea that the main purpose of the military is for national defense. Critics said that the military operations she supported in Libya, Syria, and Yemen led to the loss of lives and furthered extremism. Michigan State Professor Shireen Al-Adeimi has said, "These interventions, however, were anything but humanitarian: They led to a sharp increase in the loss of human lives, exacerbated a refugee crisis, enabled extremist groups, and caused an overall exacerbation of already-tenuous civil conflicts". It has been argued that Power's humanitarian idealism faded after she entered the State Department and began associating, both professionally and personally, with hardline realists like Henry Kissinger.

==== Views on Israel ====
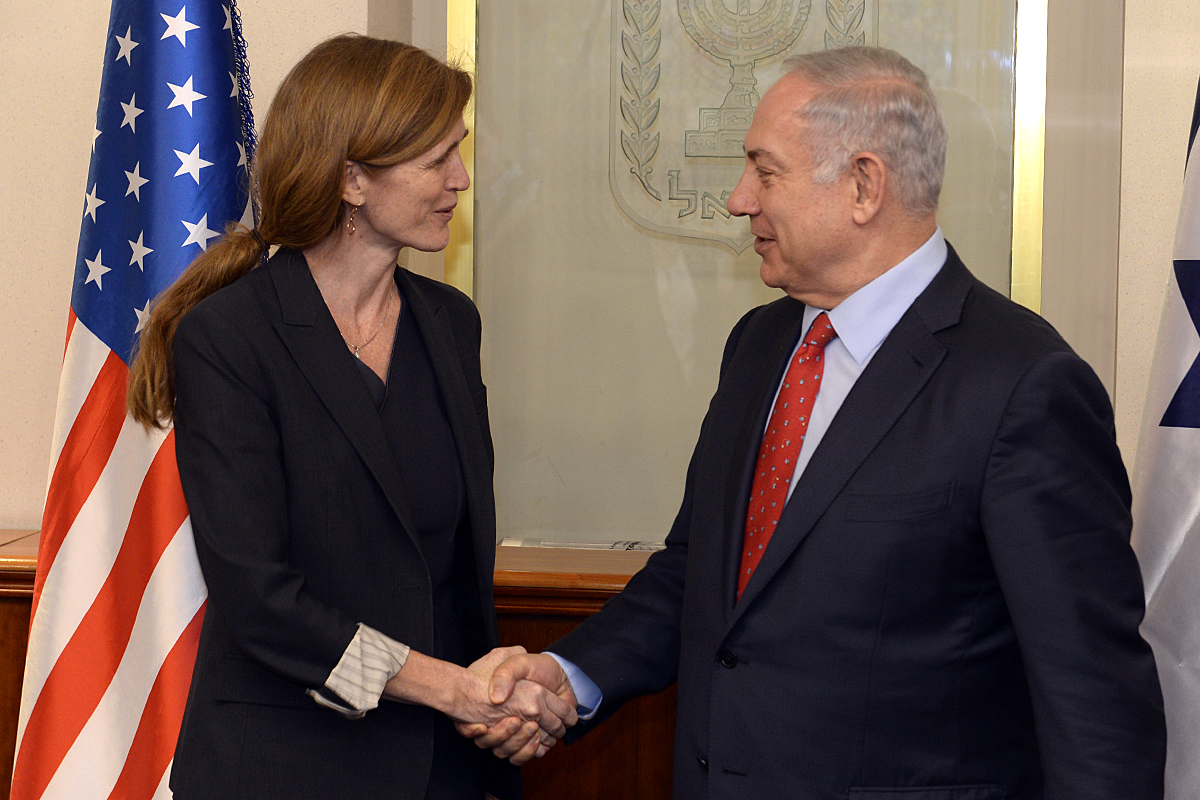
Power with Israeli Prime Minister Benjamin Netanyahu at his office in Jerusalem, February 15, 2016

Chemi Shalev wrote that individuals have described Power as being pro-Palestinian and anti-Israeli, on the basis of statements which she made in a 2002 interview with Harry Kreisler. When asked what advice she would give to the president if either the Israelis or the Palestinians looked "like they might be moving towards genocide", Power said that the United States might consider the deployment of a "mammoth protection force" to monitor developments between the Israelis and Palestinians, characterizing it as a regrettable but necessary "imposition of a solution". She clarified that remark on several occasions, including in an interview with Haaretz correspondent Shmuel Rosner in August 2008.

In July 2014, Power expressed support for Israel's right to defend itself during the 2014 Israel–Gaza conflict.

In December 2016, she expressed support for the Obama administration's refusal to veto a resolution against Israeli settlements in occupied territories. Power told the 15-member U.N. Security Council: "Israeli settlement activity in territories occupied in 1967 undermines Israel's security, harms the viability of a negotiated two-state outcome, and erodes prospects for peace and stability in the region."

==== Tenure ====
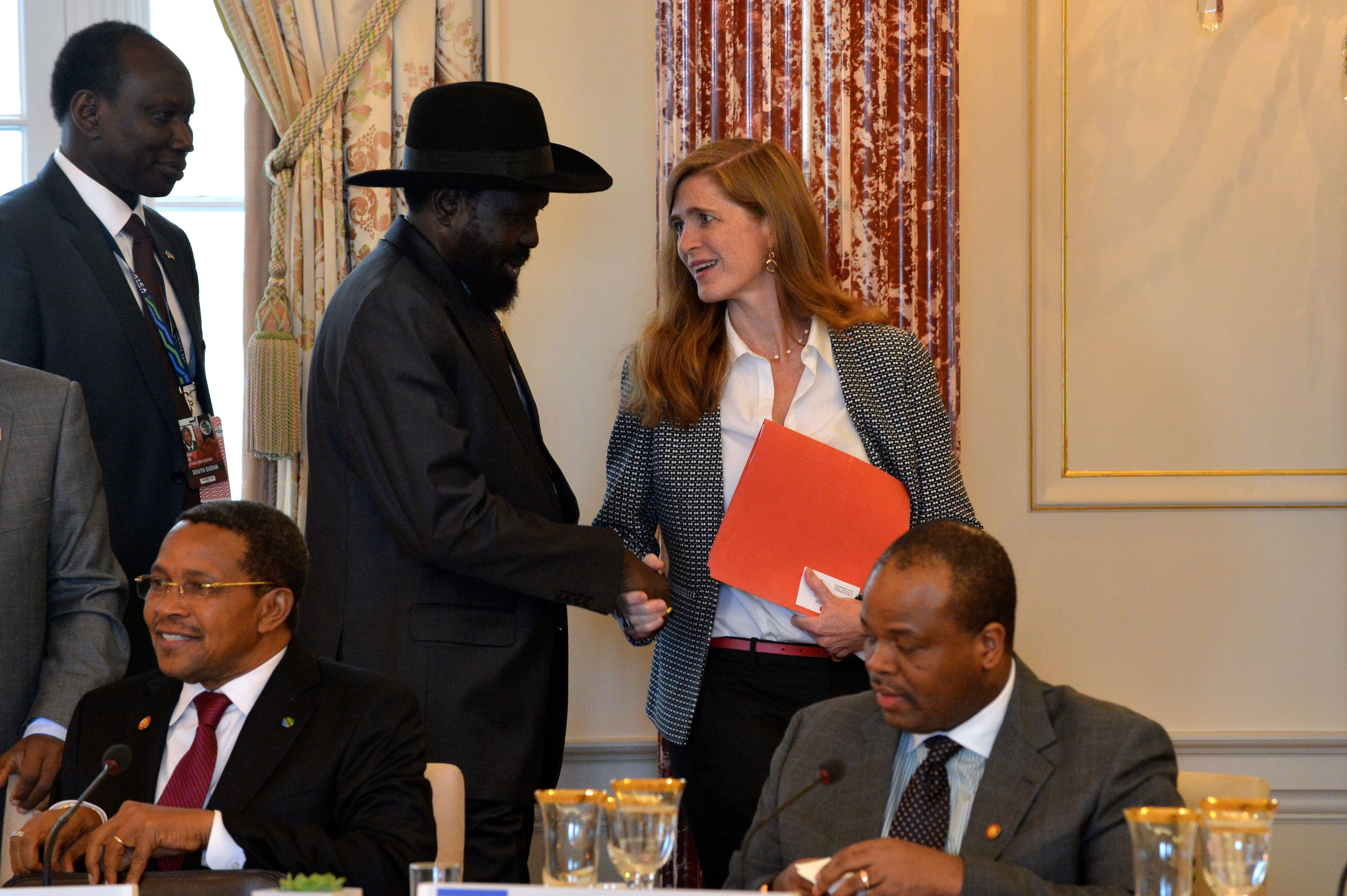
Power with South Sudanese President Salva Kiir at the U.S.-Africa Leaders Summit in Washington, D.C., August 6, 2014

Speaking in September 2013, regarding the U.S. Government Assessment of the Syrian Government's Use of Chemical Weapons on August 21, 2013, Power told a news conference that the American intelligence findings "overwhelmingly point to one stark conclusion: The Assad regime perpetrated an attack." She added, "The actions of the Assad regime are morally reprehensible, and they violate clearly established international norms." Power went on to criticize the failure of the United Nations structure to thwart or prosecute the atrocities committed in the Syrian conflict, which is now well into its third year. She said, "The system devised in 1945 precisely to deal with threats of this nature did not work as it was supposed to." She added, "Even in the wake of the flagrant shattering of the international norm against chemical weapons use, Russia continues to hold the council hostage and shirk its international responsibilities. "What we have learned, what the Syrian people have learned, is that the Security Council the world needs to deal with this crisis is not the Security Council we have." Power has herself, however, been criticized by journalist Jeff Jacoby for her lack of commitment to stopping the conflict, who wrote that she has mostly "acquiesced in the president's [Obama's] unwillingness to act."

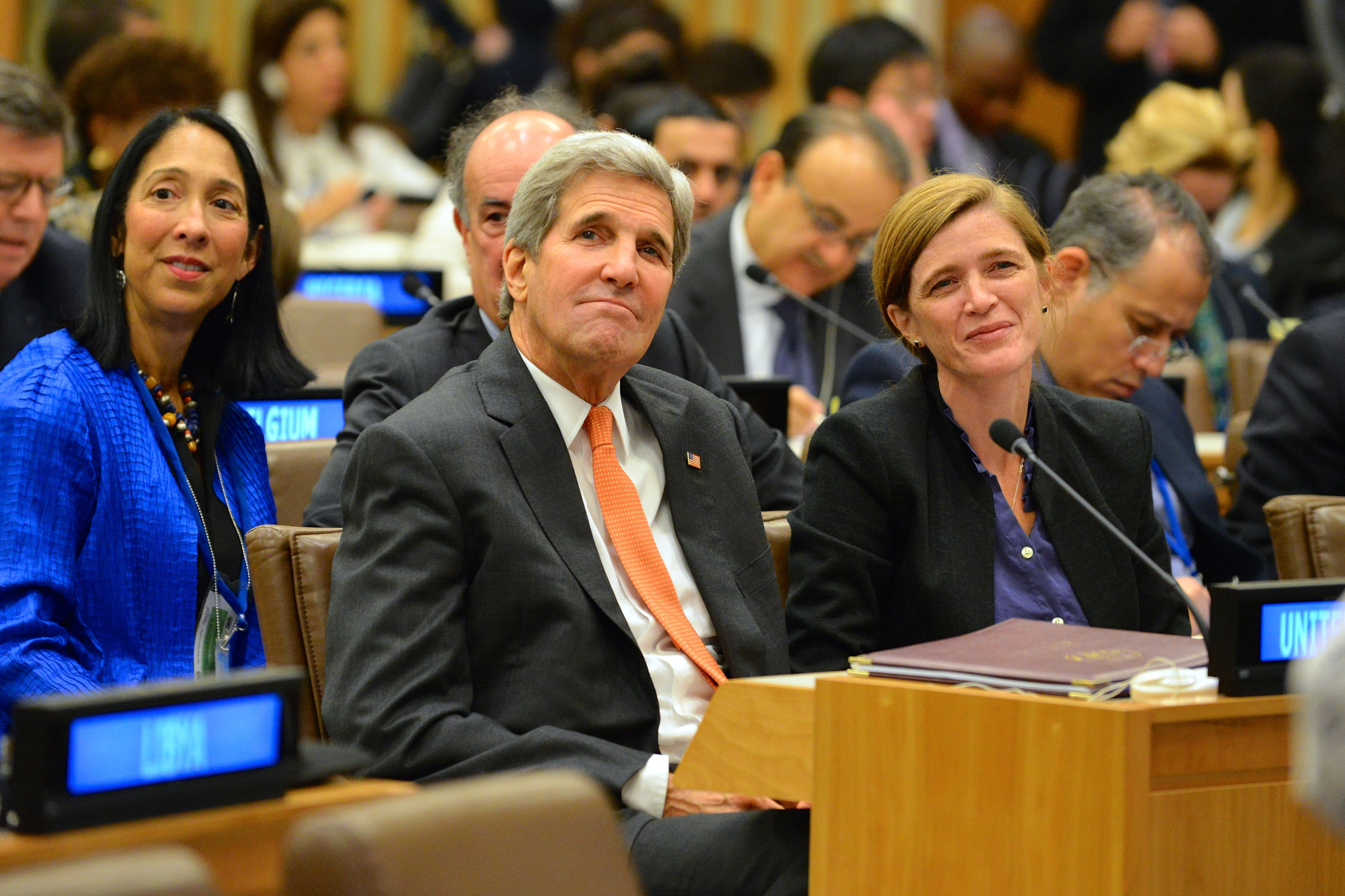
Power with Secretary of State John Kerry at a UN ministerial, October 2, 2015

In 2014, speaking on the crisis in Ukraine, Ambassador Power, told reporters that Washington was "gravely disturbed" by reports of Russian military deployments into the Crimea. "The United States calls upon Russia to pull back the military forces that are being built up in the region, to stand down, and to allow the Ukrainian people the opportunity to pursue their own government, create their own destiny and to do so freely without intimidation or fear", she said. Power declined to characterize Russian military actions when asked if they constituted aggression. She called for an independent international mediation mission to be quickly dispatched to Ukraine.

In July 2014, during a forum at Hunter College commemorating the 45th anniversary of the Stonewall riots, Power said that, in spite of significant progress in the US, the LGBT rights movement was "far from over", noting that "There are some parts of the world where the situation abroad is actually taking a sharp turn for the worse for LGBT individuals." She stated that homosexuality remains criminalized in nearly 80 countries, that Brunei was moving towards becoming the eighth country to enact capital punishment for same-sex sexual acts, and that Russia and Nigeria had also instituted anti-LGBT legislation in the last year. Referring to a law signed in February by Ugandan President Yoweri Museveni that imposes a life sentence upon anyone found guilty of repeated same-sex sexual acts, she said: "Unfortunately, Uganda's anti-gay legislation is not an outlier. Nor is the climate of intolerance and abuse that it has fostered." This speech occurred on the first anniversary of the U.S. Supreme Court decision that struck down a portion of the Defense of Marriage Act, and a week after the Obama administration announced travel bans against Ugandan officials responsible for anti-LGBT human rights abuses.

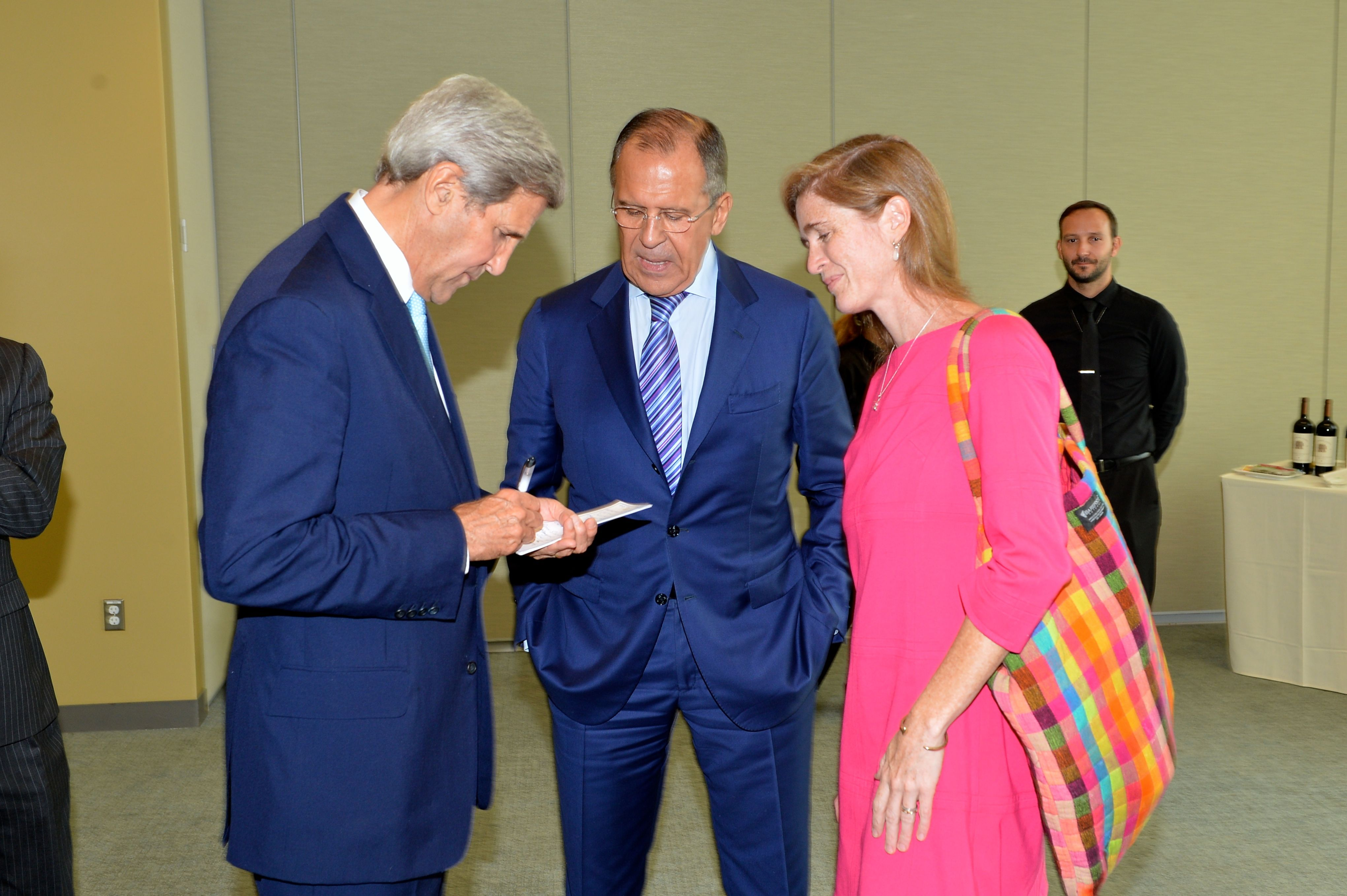
Power with John Kerry and Russian Foreign Minister Sergey Lavrov, September 29, 2015

In March 2015, Power described defense cuts planned by Europe and countries such as Britain as "very concerning" in light of the "diffuse" challenges facing the world, such as the Ebola crisis in west Africa and the threat from the Islamic State of Iraq and the Levant (ISIL). She flew to Brussels to urge European nations to abide by a NATO pledge to devote to defense at least two percent of their national budget, and she suggested that their current spending already risked being insufficient.

Power faced criticism for her silence on Obama's failure to recognize the Armenian genocide, especially after its 100th anniversary in 2015. A long-time advocate for the recognition of the Armenian Genocide by the United States, Power details her efforts to convince President Obama up until just before his 2015 speech in her memoir. She described the day during which she also gave birth to her son Declan in 2009 right after her failure to change Obama's decision as "an example of loneliness" she experienced at the White House. Power apologized for the Administration's failure on Twitter in 2017.

In June 2015, Power spoke to the U.S. House Foreign Affairs Committee while negotiations were taking place with Iran regarding granting relief of sanctions on the country in return for them scaling back their nuclear program. She told the Committee that the US would retain the ability to reinstate sanctions against Iran without unanimous support from the UN Security Council, though she said she could not provide details until a deal was finalized.

Power supported the Saudi Arabian-led intervention in Yemen against the Shia Houthis and forces loyal to former President Ali Abdullah Saleh.

In 2016, while speaking on the situation in Syria, Power said, "What Russia is sponsoring and doing is not counter-terrorism, it is barbarism", "Instead of pursuing peace, Russia and Assad make war. Instead of helping get life-saving aid to civilians, Russia and Assad are bombing the humanitarian convoys, hospitals and first responders who are trying desperately to keep people alive", Power said. A September 9 ceasefire deal between U.S. Secretary of State John Kerry and Russian Foreign Minister Sergei Lavrov aimed at putting Syria's peace process back on track effectively collapsed on Monday when an aid convoy was bombed.

Power, in her last major speech in the role, told the international community it must do everything it can to stop what she described as a Russian assault on the world order. Outlining Russian actions such as the annexation of Crimea, the bombing of civilians in Syria, and the hacking of America's election, Power drew a picture of a state whose primary aim is to sow chaos and wreak havoc on the "rules-based" world order that is girded by international law and run in bodies like the United Nations. "Russia's actions are not standing up a new world order, they are tearing down the one that exists, and this is what we are fighting against", she said in a speech at the Atlantic Council on January 17. "Having defeated the forces of fascism and communism, we now confront the forces of authoritarianism and nihilism." Those who argue, as Trump, has, that undoing sanctions against Russia will make the Kremlin more amenable "have it backwards", Power said. "Easing punitive measures ... will only embolden Russia", encourage North Korea and Iran to follow them and send the message that all they need to do is "wait it out", Power argued.

On May 31, 2017, the House Intelligence Committee subpoenaed Power's testimony and relevant records as part of its investigation into the unmasking of Americans whose conversations she obtained from intelligence surveillance.

== Honors ==
Her book "A Problem from Hell": America and the Age of Genocide won the 2003 Pulitzer Prize for General Nonfiction. Barnard College awarded Power its highest award, the 2015 Barnard Medal of Distinction, for, among many things, her book A Problem from Hell, along with her denunciation of genocide and "hope that vows of 'never again' would truly mean 'never again'". The 2016 Henry A. Kissinger Prize was awarded to Ambassador Power at the American Academy in Berlin on June 8, 2016. She was awarded the Ulysses Medal by University College Dublin in November 2017. In 2019, she was selected as the recipient of the 2019 Daniel Patrick Moynihan Prize by the American Academy of Political and Social Science. In 2019, she presented the commencement address at Indiana University, where she received the honorary degree of Doctor of Humane Letters (D.H.L.).

== Post-Obama administration career ==
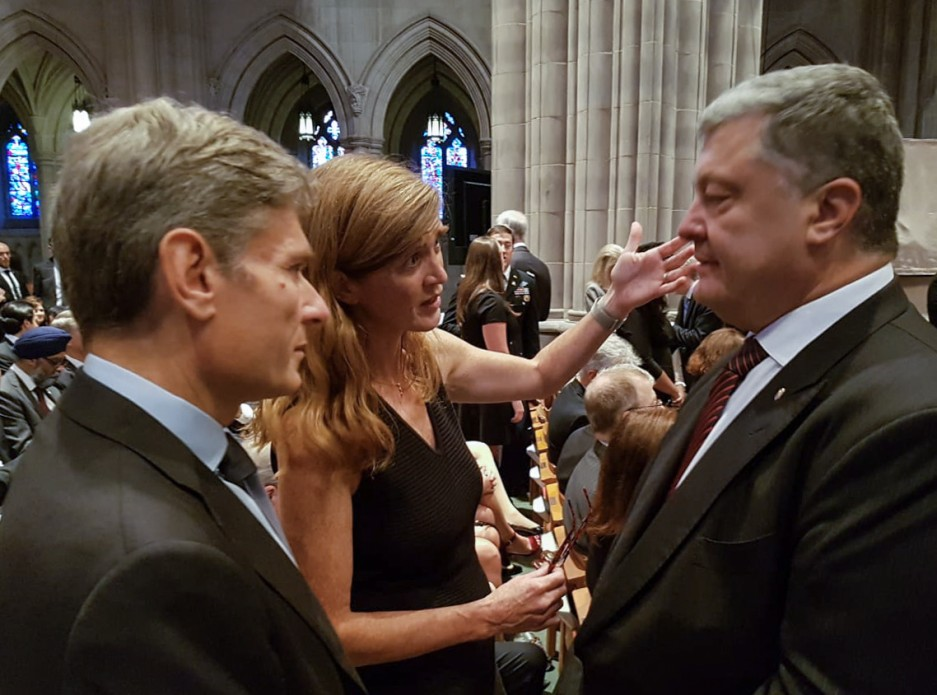
Power, Ukrainian President Petro Poroshenko and Representative Tom Malinowski at the funeral of John McCain, September 1, 2018

In April 2017, Power was named to a joint faculty appointment at Harvard Law School (HLS) and Harvard Kennedy School. At the Kennedy School, she is affiliated with the Carr Center and the Belfer Center. She serves as a senior member, board member, and director of the new International Peace and Security Project. She is currently co-teaching a Harvard class with her husband, Cass Sunstein, called "Making Change When Change is Hard."

In addition, Power holds the following positions:

- Aurora Prize, Member of the Selection Committee
- International Refugee Assistance Project (IRAP), Member of the Board of Directors
- Let America Vote, Member of the Board of Advisors

In October 2018, in response to the Saudi Arabia's explanation about the death of dissident journalist Jamal Khashoggi, Power tweeted that "Shifting from bald-face lies ("#Khashoggi left consulate") to faux condemnation (of a "rogue operation") to claiming the fox will credibly investigate what he did to the hen ... will convince nobody."

== Biden administration ==
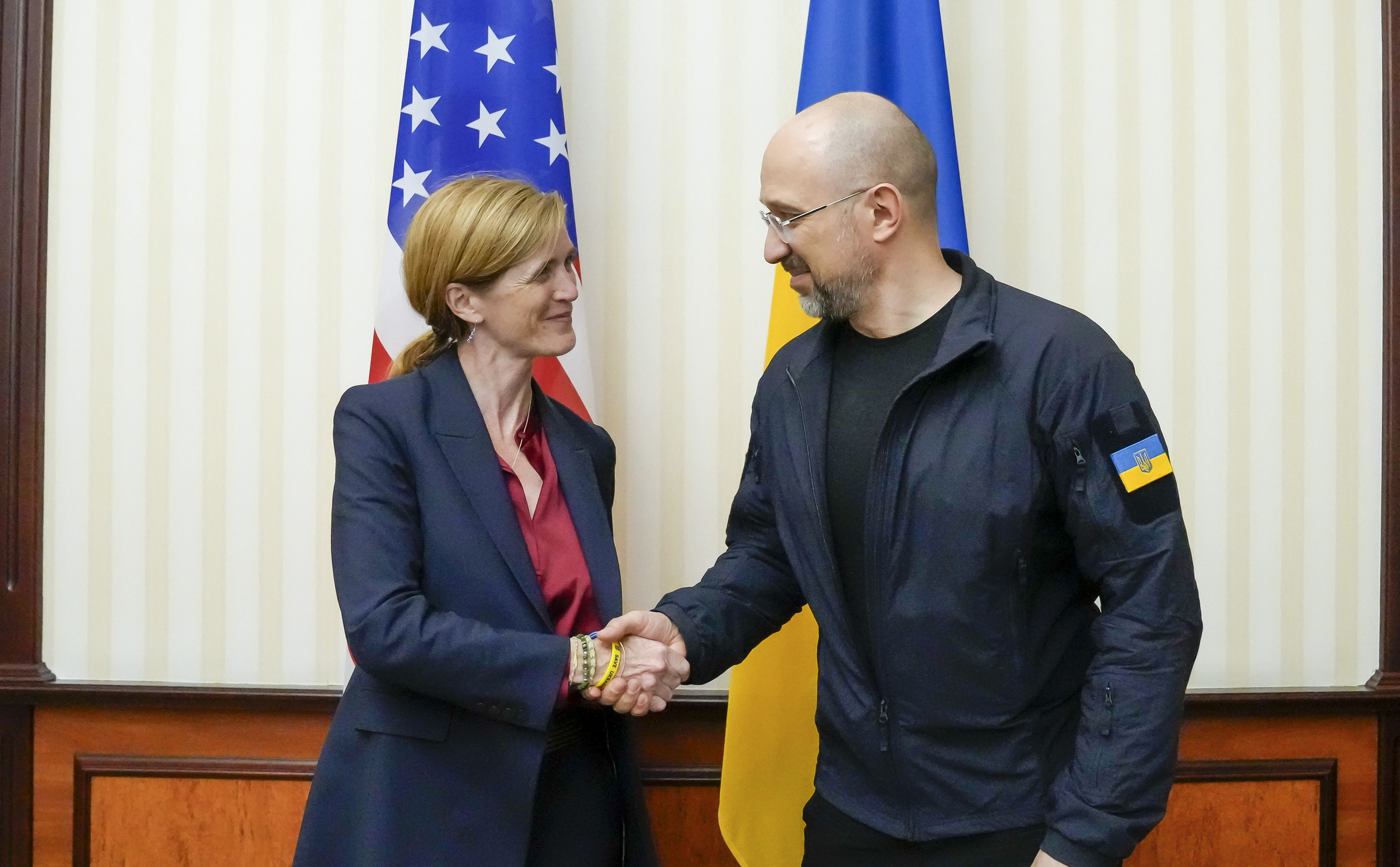
Power meeting with Denys Shmyhal in Ukraine, 2023

In January 2021, President-elect Joe Biden nominated Power to head the United States Agency for International Development (USAID). She was confirmed to the position on April 28 by a vote of 68–26, and sworn in by Vice President Kamala Harris on May 3. Power assumed leadership of USAID amidst its efforts to disburse massive amounts of foreign aid during the COVID-19 pandemic.

Power faced criticism from USAID employees for her silence amidst accusations of genocide in Gaza, given her background as a scholar of the subject.

Power's legacy at USAID was threatened after President Donald Trump implemented a near-total freeze on all foreign aid on January 24, 2025.

== Personal life ==
On July 4, 2008, Power married law professor Cass Sunstein, whom she met while working on the Obama campaign. They were married in the Church of Mary Immaculate, Lohar, Waterville, County Kerry, in Ireland. On April 24, 2009, she gave birth to their first child, a son. On June 1, 2012, she gave birth to their second child, a daughter. Power is a Catholic.

== Books ==
- "A Problem from Hell": America in the age of Genocide. Basic Books, 2002.
- Chasing the Flame: Sergio Vieira de Mello and the Fight to Save the World. Penguin Books, 2008.
- The Unquiet American: Richard Holbrook in the World (co-edited with Derek Chollet, 2011). PublicAffairs, 2011
- The Education of an Idealist: A Memoir. Dey Street Books, 2019.

Diplomatic posts
| Preceded by Rosemary DiCarlo; Acting | United States Ambassador to the United Nations; 2013–2017 | Succeeded by Nikki Haley |
Political offices
| Preceded by Gloria Steele; Acting | Administrator of the United States Agency for International Development; 2021–2025 | Succeeded by Jason Gray; Acting |
