= Brock Bierman =

American public official

Brock Daniel Bierman
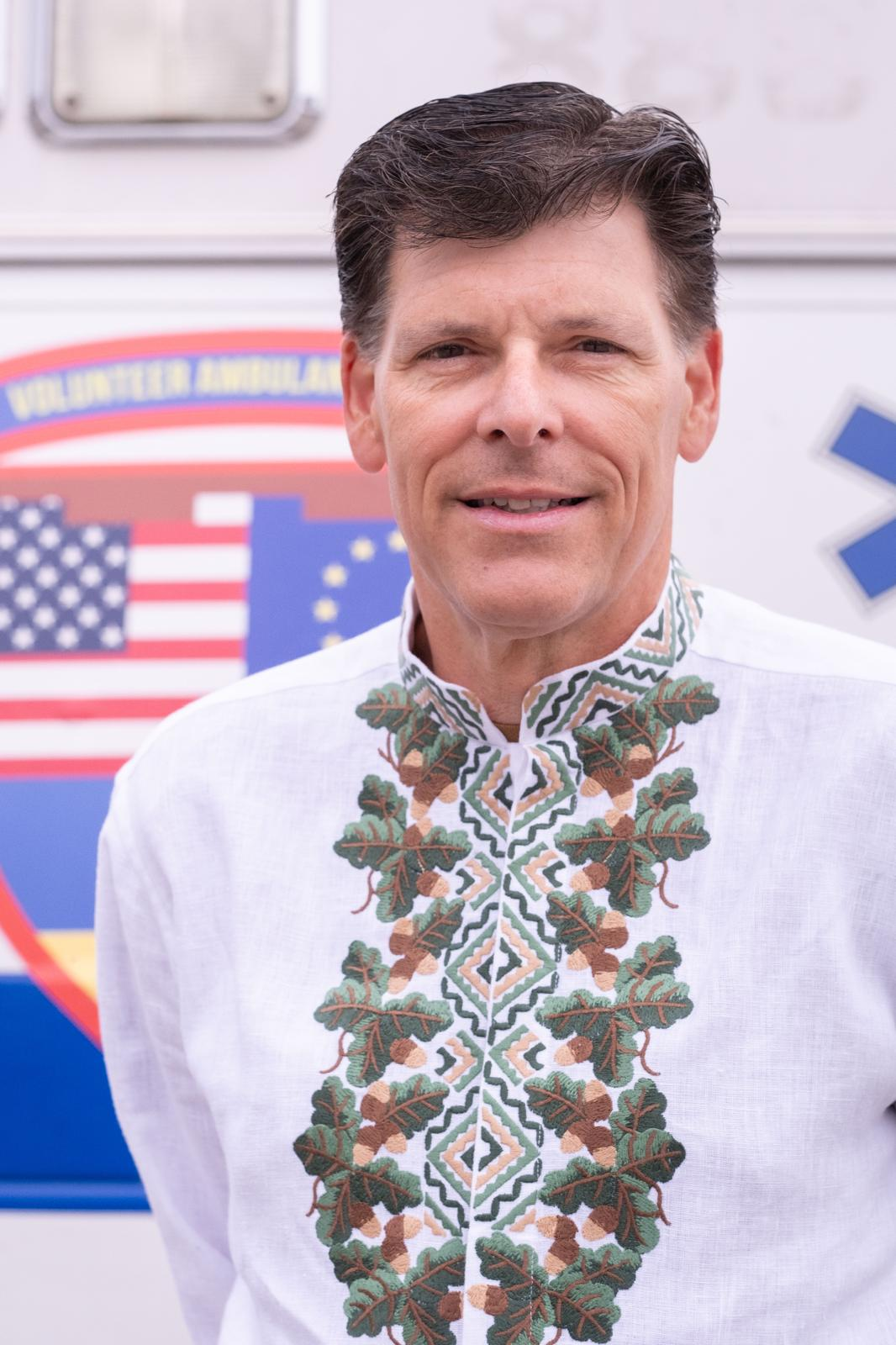

Assistant Administrator of the United States Agency for International Development for Europe and Eurasia
- In office 2018–2021
- President: Donald Trump
- Preceded by: Thomas O. Melia
- Succeeded by: Erin Elizabeth McKee

Personal details
- Education: Bowling Green State University (BS)

Brock Daniel Bierman is an American humanitarian and public official who served as Assistant Administrator of the United States Agency for International Development's (USAID) Bureau for Europe and Eurasia under president Donald Trump from December 21, 2017 until 2021. He is president and CEO of Ukraine Focus, a nonprofit he helped established and officially launched in March 2023.

In 2022, Bierman led seven missions to Ukraine to deliver humanitarian assistance. As founder of the Volunteer Ambulance Corps, he helped raised $2 million through a partnership with Rotary International to purchase 76 ambulances to Ukraine, personally driving several to the front lines of the Russian invasion of Ukraine in Kharkiv and Mykolaiv. For his humanitarian contributions, Ukraine's Territorial Defense Force made him an honorary soldier. Bierman is considered an expert on democracy and governance by the German Marshall Fund, where he's a Visiting Fellow.

In September 2023, Bierman was honored with the highest award of the city of Bucha – the "Order for Merits to the City of Bucha" presented by Bucha's mayor, Anatolii Fedoruk.

"Brock Bierman is a true friend of Bucha and Ukraine," Fedoruk said. "Today, he once again came to us with volunteers from his charitable organization, Ukraine Focus, who delivered nearly 200 ambulances to the front lines, with more on the way."

Bierman helped establish a sister city relationship between Bucha and the City of Albany, New York. For his support of the Bucha community, Bierman was awarded its highest honor, The 'Order for Merits to the City of Bucha. "We need more great Ukrainians like him," Fedoruk said.

In September 2023 Bierman was awarded an honorary distinction by the World for Ukraine Foundation for his exceptional dedication and service to Ukraine. "Under his leadership, Ukraine Focus has been unwavering in providing targeted humanitarian and medical aid to Ukraine, always tailored to the specific needs of local Ukrainian communities," a statement by the World for Ukraine Foundation said. "Brock's steadfast commitment to making a positive impact on Ukraine's relief efforts is not only commendable but also serves as an inspiration to others. True leaders like Brock set an example, demonstrating dedication and perseverance in the face of challenges."

To date, in collaboration with donors and partners, Brock has helped raise $5 million, which has been used to acquire ambulances. Since the beginning of the war in Ukraine, he has purchased 165 ambulances and drove them to Ukraine's frontlines.

== Life and career ==
The son of the late Daniel Pryor Bierman, an executive at Sears, Roebuck & Co., and Joan Audrey Coesens, Bierman was born in Middletown, CT. and attended Toll Gate High School in Warwick, Rhode Island and studied journalism at Bowling Green State University, where he was later inducted into its Journalism Hall of Fame. Bierman started his career as an entrepreneur, forming a business which protected American intellectual property around the world.

From 1994 to 2002, Bierman served three terms as a Republican in the Rhode Island House of Representatives, representing the state's 23rd district. His legislative accomplishments included major legislation passed protecting Rhode Island's environment and protecting civilian jobs of Rhode Island National Guardsmen deployed overseas during the Iraq War, which earned him the Public Service Commendation Medal from Rhode Island Adjutant General Reginald Centracchio.

In 2002, Bierman was hired as chief of staff and senior advisor to the Bureau for Europe and Eurasia at the US Agency for International Development (USAID). For his work at USAID Bierman was awarded Moldova's Medal of Civic Merit in 2006 by Moldova's then-president Vladimir Voronin.

In the aftermath of Hurricane Katrina, in 2007 Bierman was appointed by George W. Bush as the nation's first Small State and Rural Advocate at the Federal Emergency Management Agency.

Bierman was also named director of Citizen Corps, a program under the Department of Homeland Security which oversaw community preparedness for the United States, and the nation's largest network of volunteers for natural and manmade disasters. Under President Bush he also oversaw FEMA's Community Emergency Response Team (CERT) a program which educates the American public about disaster preparedness and sponsors training of basic emergency skills such as fire suppression, search and rescue (SAR), and handling mass casualties with triage and disaster first aid.

In October 2017, Bierman was nominated by Donald Trump to serve as USAID's Assistant Administrator for Europe and Eurasia and his appointment was confirmed by the United States Senate by unanimous voice vote in December of that year. Serving in that capacity, Bierman led the expansive response of USAID's Bureau for Europe and Eurasia to COVID-19 and wrote an extensive report on a USAID initiative, called "Countering Malign Kremlin Influence," to support Eastern European countries including Ukraine, Georgia, Moldova and Azerbaijan in an effort to withstand influence from the Russian government.

Bierman helped establish the European Democracy Youth Network (EDYN), an NGO of civic activists, political leaders and journalists in 23 countries which he helped create during his tenure at USAID to bring young leaders together to push back against polarization, and find common ground against authoritarian revisionism. To implement EDYN, Bierman worked extensively with his implementing partners, the International Republican Institute and the National Democratic Institute.

Bierman served as acting CEO of the Millennium Challenge Corporation (MCC) in 2018, but was removed by the White House after two months following a dispute with Karen Sessions (the wife of Texas Representative Pete Sessions) that arose when Bierman instituted a hiring freeze on political appointees within the organization. Prior to the hiring freeze and subsequent dispute, The Washington Post had reported that the White House had been rewarding Trump supporters with jobs within the MCC, with the previous acting CEO Robert Blau resigning amid controversy over the political nature of those placements.

Before joining Worldwide Friends and starting Ukraine Focus, Bierman spearheaded an effort in partnership with George Tuka, former deputy minister and governor of Luhansk Oblast, Ukraine to deliver ambulances and medical supplies to the Ukrainian frontlines with the partnership of Rotary International and the Andrew Sabin Family Foundation.

In May 2022, Bierman was named president and CEO of Worldwide Friends Foundation, a New York-based 501(c)(3) humanitarian organization, to immediately administer the organization's current mission, UkraineFriends.org which had been operating buses daily to evacuate nearly 30,000 Ukrainian women, children and seniors from Lviv, Ukraine to Przemysl, Poland, and through a partnership with Airbnb offering vouchers to temporarily house 14,000 evacuees, and to support needs related to mental health, foreign language, translation services, and reconstruction/repatriation after the war.

Bierman has made eleven trips to Ukraine since April, first to review refugee centers with a focus to assess their needs, and more help to personally deliver 90 ambulances. While in Ukraine Bierman has met with members of the Territorial Defense Forces, the Ministry of Health and local and state officials and volunteers to help assist internally displaced people (IDP's). In January 2023, Bierman supported the Mayor of Bucha, Andrii Federuk's trip to the United States, where they visited Washington DC, New York and Pennsylvania.

In addition to serving as a government official across several Federal agencies, Bierman has also served stints in the private sector, including as a business executive for Ancestry.com.

== Personal life ==
Bierman is married to Lisa Bierman and has two children.

== See also ==
- Tom Dine
- John Barsa
- Anupama Rajaraman
- Pop Buell
- Atul Gawande
