= Paloma Adams-Allen =

Jamaican-American political advisor

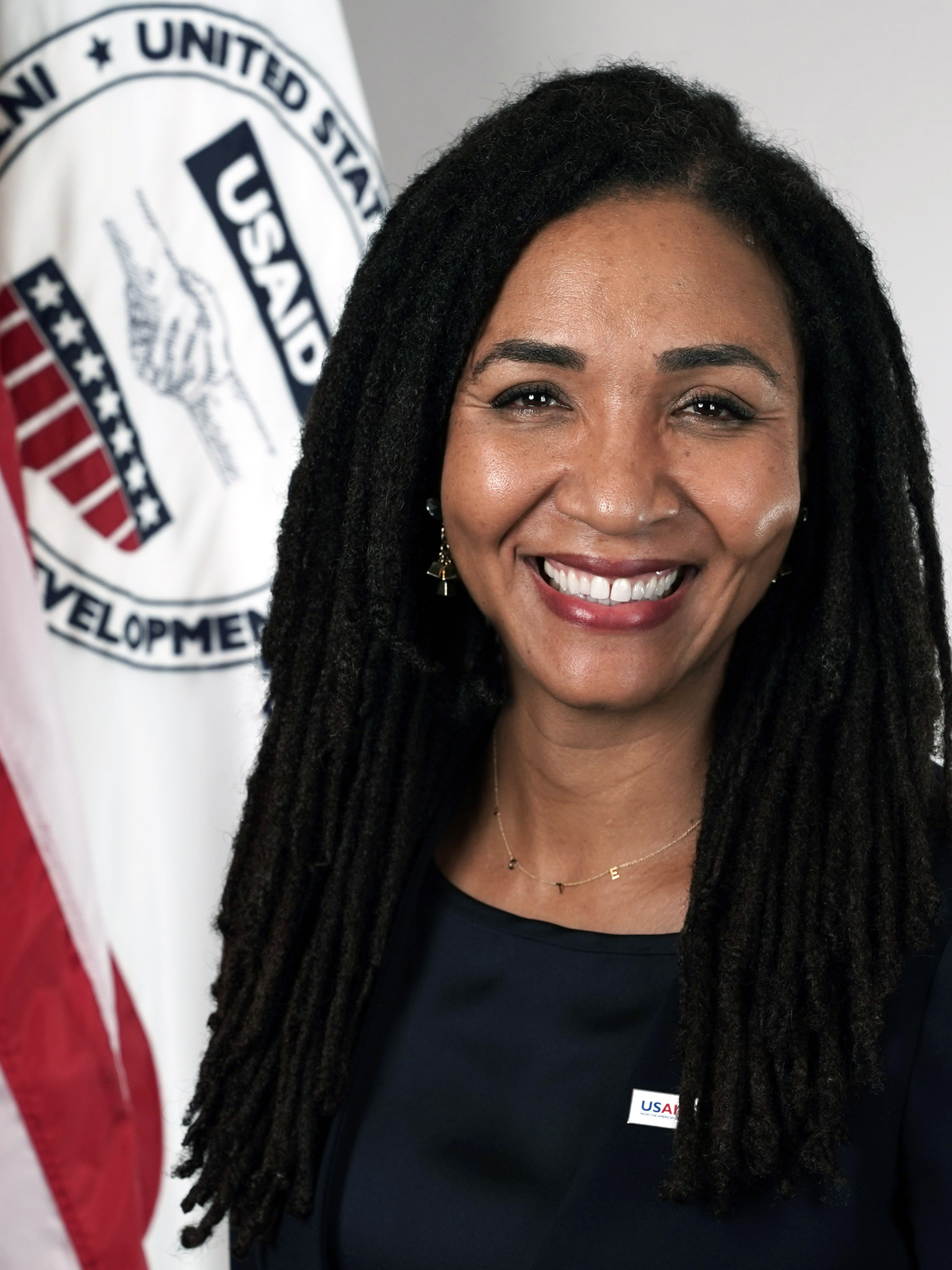

Deputy Administrator of the United States Agency for International Development for Management and Resources
- In office October 12, 2021 – April 30, 2024
- President: Joe Biden
- Preceded by: Bonnie Glick

President of the Inter-American Foundation
- In office April 2017 – October 2021
- Preceded by: Robert Kaplan
- Succeeded by: Sara Aviel

Personal details
- Born: Jamaica
- Children: 2
- Education: Brown University (BA); Johns Hopkins University (MA); Georgetown University (JD)

Paloma Adams-Allen is a Jamaican-American foreign policy advisor who served as the deputy administrator of the United States Agency for International Development (USAID) for management and resources in the Biden administration from October 2021 to April 2024.

== Early life and education ==
Adams-Allen was born and raised in Jamaica. She earned a Bachelor of Arts degree in development studies from Brown University, a Master of International Affairs from Johns Hopkins University, and a Juris Doctor from the Georgetown University Law Center.

== Career ==
From 1998 to 2000, Adams-Allen was the director of the Caribbean and Central America Action's financial services program. She was then a summer law associate at Coudert Brothers. In 2000, she joined the Organization of American States, serving as a senior advisor and regional manager. In 2010, she joined the United States Agency for International Development, serving as a senior advisor for Latin America and the Caribbean and later associate deputy administrator for the same region. From 2016 to 2017, she was the senior director of private sector partnerships at Winrock International. In April 2017, she became the president of the Inter-American Foundation.

=== Biden administration ===
On June 3, 2021, President Joe Biden nominated Adams-Allen to be the deputy administrator of USAID. The Senate Foreign Relations Committee held hearings on Adams-Allen's nomination on July 20, 2021. The committee favorably reported her nomination to the Senate floor on August 4, 2021. Adams-Allen was confirmed by the entire Senate on October 5, 2021, by a vote of 79-20.

Adams-Allen assumed office on October 12, 2021. She resigned her position in April 2024.

== Personal life ==
Adams-Allen lives in Washington D.C., with her husband and two daughters.

== See also ==
- Frank Almaguer
- Anupama Rajaraman
