= United States African Development Foundation =

Agency of the United States government

Coordinates: 38.9010349°N 77.0322568°W

- Founded: 1980
- Legal status: Federal agency of the United States
- Headquarters: Washington, D.C.
- Region served: Benin, Botswana, Burkina Faso, Burundi, Democratic Republic of Congo, Guinea, Kenya, Liberia, Malawi, Mali, Mauritania, Niger, Nigeria, Rwanda, Senegal, Somalia, South Sudan, Tanzania, Uganda, Zambia, and Zimbabwe
- Methods: $30 million appropriated funds in FY 2016, $53 million invested in 500 active enterprises in 20 African countries. $80 million in new economic activities in underserved communities in Africa.
- Chair of the board of directors: Vacant
- President and Chief Executive Officer: Pete Marocco (not confirmed by Senate)
- Website: www.usadf.gov

The U.S. African Development Foundation (USADF) is an independent U.S. government agency established by Congress in 1980 to invest directly in African grassroots enterprises and social entrepreneurs. USADF's investments aim to increase incomes, revenues, and jobs by promoting self-reliance and market-based solutions to poverty. USADF targets marginalized populations and underserved communities in the Sahel, Great Lakes, and the Horn of Africa. It partners with African governments, other U.S. government agencies, private corporations, and foundations to achieve transformative results.

In February 2025 President Donald Trump signed an executive order stating that "the non-statutory components and functions" of a handful of governmental entities, including the USADF, "shall be eliminated to the maximum extent consistent with applicable law". Subsequently, in accordance with an executive order, USADF temporarily stopped disbursing funds and submitted a report describing its mission and needed resources. On February 28, the Trump administration named Peter Marocco to run the agency.

== History ==
After its creation as a government corporation on December 16, 1980 when President Carter approved Public Law 96–533, the African Development Foundation began program operations in 1984. It has since provided financing to more than 1,700 small enterprises and community-based organizations.

In 1977, Senators Edward Kennedy and George McGovern sponsored the African Development Foundation Act. It proposed establishing USADF to cooperate with indigenous organizations representative of Africa and other private, regional, and international organizations. It also authorized USADF to make grants, loans, and loan guarantees to African entities for developmental purposes and required the agency to give priority to community self-help projects with the maximum feasible participation of the poor and provided for the appointment of a board of directors to manage the agency.

In 1983, the Senate confirmed the nominations of the first USADF board that held its first meeting at the offices of the Inter-American Foundation (IAF). By September 1984, the USADF Board of Directors awarded grants to 11 grassroots organizations in six African nations totaling $838,000.

From 1985 to 1987, USADF carried out its development model in 19 African countries, awarding more than 100 grants totaling $10.3 million. By the end of 1987, USADF had developed accords or memorandums of understanding with nine African governments.

In 1998, USADF entered into its first host country government co-funding partnership with Botswana, through which USADF and the Botswana government provided matching funds for project grants that foster community-led economic development. Since then, USADF has received more than $34 million from African governments to implement community-enterprise programming in their countries.

In 2004, USADF implemented new strategic initiatives to expand trade and investment opportunities between Africa and the United States and to provide African communities with resources to prevent HIV/AIDS and mitigate its social and economic impact. Throughout the 2000s, USADF supported agriculture commodities including paprika in Zimbabwe, red onions in Niger, vanilla in Uganda, sesame in Burkina Faso, shea in West Africa, and coffee across East Africa. USADF support of coffee cooperatives has facilitated several of them exporting premium coffee to the United States and Europe.

In 2013, USADF began awarding renewable energy grants to small and medium enterprises (SMEs) and African entrepreneurs. Since then, it has awarded more than $11 million to more than 115 African off-grid energy enterprises to help combat insufficient access to energy across the continent.

USADF provided $5 million for grantees beginning in early 2020 to manage the economic effects of the COVID-19 pandemic on local economies and health care providers. Between 2019 and 2023, it awarded more than $141 million in grants to more than 1,050 community enterprises in Africa, directly affecting the lives of 6.2 million people on the continent.

In March 2024, US Senators Jim Risch and Tim Scott, both Republican members of the Senate Committee on Foreign Relations, sent a letter to the US Agency for International Development inspector general (USAID OIG) stating that whistleblowers from USADF claimed there had been irregularities in the use and spending of foundation funds, conflicts of interest, inappropriate management, and efforts to hide such wrongdoing.

USAID OIG opened an inspection of USADF on March 25, 2024 recommending that USADF improve its fraud, waste, and abuse policies and training and concluding in August 2024 that any issues had been resolved.

=== Second Trump administration ===
On February 19, 2025, US President Donald Trump issued an executive order declaring that the "non-statutory components or functions" of USADF and three other agencies including IAF "shall be eliminated to the maximum extent consistent with applicable law, and that such entities shall reduce the performance of their statutory functions and associated personnel to the minimum presence and function required by law". In accordance with the order, USADF temporarily stopped disbursing funds and submitted a report describing its mission and needed resources.

On February 24, the White House Presidential Personnel Office (PPO) notified USADF board member Ward Brehm that Trump was removing him. PPO claimed other board members were also notified of their removal by email, but at least one of their names was incorrectly spelled, so those emails may not have been received. The same day, Democratic members of the Senate Committee on Foreign Relations wrote to Trump objecting to any attempt to reduce, reorganize, or eliminate USADF or IAF.

On February 28, the administration named Pete Marocco to run USADF. In an emergency meeting on March 3, four other USADF board members named Brehm as foundation president. On March 5, 2025, Marocco and five DOGE staffers were turned away from the USADF offices by foundation security staff. Brehm, who was not present, wrote to a DOGE staffer that he had instructed his staff not to allow such meetings without his being present and that he looked forward to working with Marocco should he be nominated to the USADF board and confirmed by the Senate.

On the morning of March 6, Marocco and DOGE staffers returned to the USADF offices accompanied by five armed individuals purportedly from the US Marshals Service, entered the facility, and reportedly changed the locks. In a statement to the Washington Post, USADF declared it would "follow the law with the expectation that our staff will be treated with dignity and respect”. NBC News questioned whether the armed individuals who accompanied Marocco and the DOGE staffers really were US Marshals. The response to the media questioning directed to the US Department of Justice was, "We are not making a statement at this time. We do request that you please verify with your sources that your reporting would be accurate."

Later that day, Brehm filed suit against Trump, DOGE, Marocco, the heads of PPO, and the US General Services Administration seeking a temporary restraining order (TRO) barring them from entering the foundation offices or removing him as chair and declaring attempts to do so beyond their legal authority.

US District Judge Richard J. Leon issued an administrative stay the same day ordering that Brehm not be removed from his position and that neither Marocco nor any other person be appointed in Brehm's place pending a hearing on March 11. While Leon denied the motion for a TRO stating that it did not meet the threshold for showing immediate and irreparable harm, he required DOGE staffers to be available for testimony under oath as to the actions taken to maintain USADF's "minimum presence and function required by law". The judge also noted that the legal authorities the government cited in its response to the motion ignored Congressional amendments and U.S. Supreme Court precedent. Both sides were ordered to confer and state their positions on further action by March 12. On June 10, 2025, Leon ruled that former Brehm lacked standing to challenge Marocco's appointment as Brehm had been legally removed from his position beforehand.

== Operations ==
Working through a community-led development model, USADF provides grant capital of up to $250,000, capacity-building assistance, and convening opportunities to develop, grow, and scale African enterprises and entrepreneurs. These investments address food insecurity, insufficient energy access, and unemployment, particularly among women and youth. USADF utilizes 100 percent African staff and local partners on the ground across Africa, operating in areas that are often too remote or fragile to be reached by other U.S. government development agencies.

The USADF measures grant success in terms of jobs created and sustained, household and enterprise incomes increased, and grantee organizations strengthened. Congress provides the funds for USADF to carry out its activities.

USADF is funded through annual appropriations for foreign operations. USADF links African host country government funds, corporate social investments, and U.S. Government interagency funding sources to achieve sustainable economic growth opportunities for grassroots, small, and growing enterprises in underserved regions across Africa. USADF has leveraged more than $34 million from participating African governments.

USADF is governed by a board of directors that includes seven members who are nominated by the president of the United States and confirmed by the United States Senate. The board of directors selects the USADF president and CEO, who manages the day-to-day activities of the foundation.

In various projects for 2019, it's estimated that the USADF $25 million investment had a multiplier effect and led to $72 million in new economic activity. By December 2020, USADF had invested more than $265 million via nearly 4,000 grants to African enterprises affecting over 10 million lives.

In fiscal year 2020, USADF awarded 253 new grants, investing primarily in early-stage agriculture, off-grid energy, and youth-led and women-led enterprises and skills training programs.

According to the OECD, the largest share of gross bilateral official development assistance from the United States went to sub-Saharan Africa and to partner countries in the least-developed country (LDC) category.

== Leadership ==
=== Board of directors ===
The board of directors is composed of seven members, appointed by the president of the United States and with the consent of the United States Senate. Of these, five members are appointed from private life, and two members from among officers and employees of U.S. agencies concerned with African affairs. All members shall be appointed on the basis of their understanding of and sensitivity to community level development processes. No more than four members may be affiliated with the same political party. Members are appointed to terms of six years, but they may continue to serve on the board until a successor is confirmed.

The foundation president designates one member to serve as chairperson and one member to serve as vice chairperson. A majority of the members of the board constitutes a quorum.

=== Foundation president ===
The USADF board names the president of the foundation. In February 2025, claiming that USADF was boardless, the Trump administration named Pete Marocco USADF president. As of June 2025 Marocco had not been confirmed by the US Senate.

Previous presidents include C.D. Glin and Travis Adkins.

=== Current board members ===
The current USADF board members as of August 7, 2026:

Position	Name	Group	Party	Assumed office	Term expiration
Chair	Vacant	Private life			September 22, 2029
Vice chair	Vacant	Private life			February 9, 2032
Member	Frank Garcia	Private life	Republican	TBD	September 22, 2031
Member	Vacant	Private life			September 22, 2029
Member	Vacant	Private life			November 13, 2031
Member	Vacant	Government employee			September 27, 2026
Member	Vacant	Government employee			September 22, 2027

=== Nominations ===
President Trump has nominated the following to fill seats on the board. They await Senate confirmation.

Name	Group	Party	Term expires	Replacing
Laken Rapier	Private life	Republican	September 27, 2027	Linda Thomas-Greenfield
Russell Vought	Private life	Republican	September 22, 2027	Linda I. Etim

== See also ==
- Title 22 of the Code of Federal Regulations
