= Ariel Armony =

Argentine academic

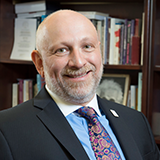

Vice Chancellor for Global Affairs at University of Pittsburgh
- In office June 2017 – Present

Personal details
- Born: September 17, 1961 (age 64) Buenos Aires
- Spouse: Mirna Kolbowski
- Children: Ian Armony, Alan Armony
- Education: University of Pittsburgh (PhD); Ohio University (M.A.); University of Buenos Aires (BA)
- Profession: Professor, political scientist, university administrator

Dr. Ariel Armony is an Argentine-born academic and the current Vice Chancellor for Global Affairs at The University of Pittsburgh. Armony is the author of five books on political science, Latin American studies, and urban studies. Armony has led University of Pittsburgh's international programs since 2015, as Senior Director of International Programs and then as Vice Provost and Vice Chancellor for Global Affairs. He is also Director of the University Center for International Studies. In Fall of 2024, he will begin his new role as Provost and Executive Vice President of Babson College in Wellesley, Massachusetts.

== Early life ==
Armony was born and raised in Buenos Aires. He attended the University of Buenos Aires in the 1980s, working as a journalist and as a director and actor for a theatre company. He traveled to the United States to study for his master's degree in international affairs at Ohio University, and stayed in the U.S. to earn his PhD in political science from the University of Pittsburgh.

== Career ==
Dr. Armony served as a professor and then as Director of Latin American Studies at Colby College. While at Colby, Dr. Armony accepted a residential fellowship at the Woodrow Wilson International Center for Scholars in Washington, DC and a Fulbright scholarship to teach at Nankai University. Following this, Dr. Armony was the Director of the University of Miami's Center for Latin American Studies, which he relaunched as the Miami Institute for Advanced Study of the Americas, a position he held for four years.

Dr. Armony returned to his alma mater, The University of Pittsburgh, in 2015 as Senior Director of International Programs and Director of the University Center for International Studies. In 2017, he was named Vice Provost for Global Affairs. In 2022, he was named Vice Chancellor for Global Affairs. During his time at Pitt, he also held faculty appointments in the Graduate School of Public and International Affairs and in the Kenneth P. Dietrich School of Arts and Sciences.

In the Fall of 2024, Dr. Armony will begin his role as Provost and Executive Vice President of Babson College in Wellesley, Massachusetts.

In addition to his academic appointments, Dr. Armony has served as a consultant for the US State Department, Argentina's Foreign Affairs Ministry, and Honduras’ National Commissioner for Human Rights.

Dr. Armony's early academic research focused on questions of democratization, civil society, and human rights. His first book, Argentina, the United States, and the Anti-Communist Crusade in Latin America (Ohio, 1997), traces the role of the Argentine military in their support of counter-revolutionary movements throughout Latin America. The book was translated into Spanish and published by the Universidad de Quilmes in Argentina. Dr. Armony's second book, The Dubious Link: Civic Engagement and Democratization (Stanford, 2004), challenges the idea of a positive, universal connection between civil society and democracy, and argues that the specific context in which people organize shapes the character of civil society. This book made the University Press Bestsellers List.

In 2012, Dr. Armony co-edited a book titled From the Great Wall to the New Work: China and Latin America in the 21st Century. This book explores new interactions between China and Latin America and the impact they have on one another culturally, politically, and economically. His following book, titled The Global Edge: Miami in the Twenty-First Century examines Miami in the context of globalization and scrutinizes its newfound place as a major international city. Finally, his book Emerging Global Cities: Origin, Structure, and Significance, was published in 2022. This book argues that Dubai, Miami, and Singapore are emerging global cities and demonstrates how the rapid and unexpected rise of these three cities recasts global urban studies at large.

Dr. Armony is currently working on a book about climate change and global migration. Featuring both story-driven comics and rigorous academic research, the book will be a comprehensive overview of the subject intended for students and practitioners alike.

Dr. Armony's work has also been published in numerous academic journals in the United States, Mexico, Colombia, Argentina, and China. His research has been supported by the Rockefeller Foundation, Mellon Foundation, Kellogg Foundation, the International Development Research Centre, the Inter-American Foundation, and the International Labour Organization, among others.

== Selected works ==
- The Global Edge: Miami in the Twenty-First Century, University of California Press, 2018, ISBN 978-0520297111
- The Dubious Link, Stanford University Press, 2004, ISBN 978-0804748988
- Argentina, the United States, and the Anti-Communist Crusade in Central America, 1977-1984, Ohio University Press, 1997, ISBN 978-0896801967
