= Sara Aviel =

American government official

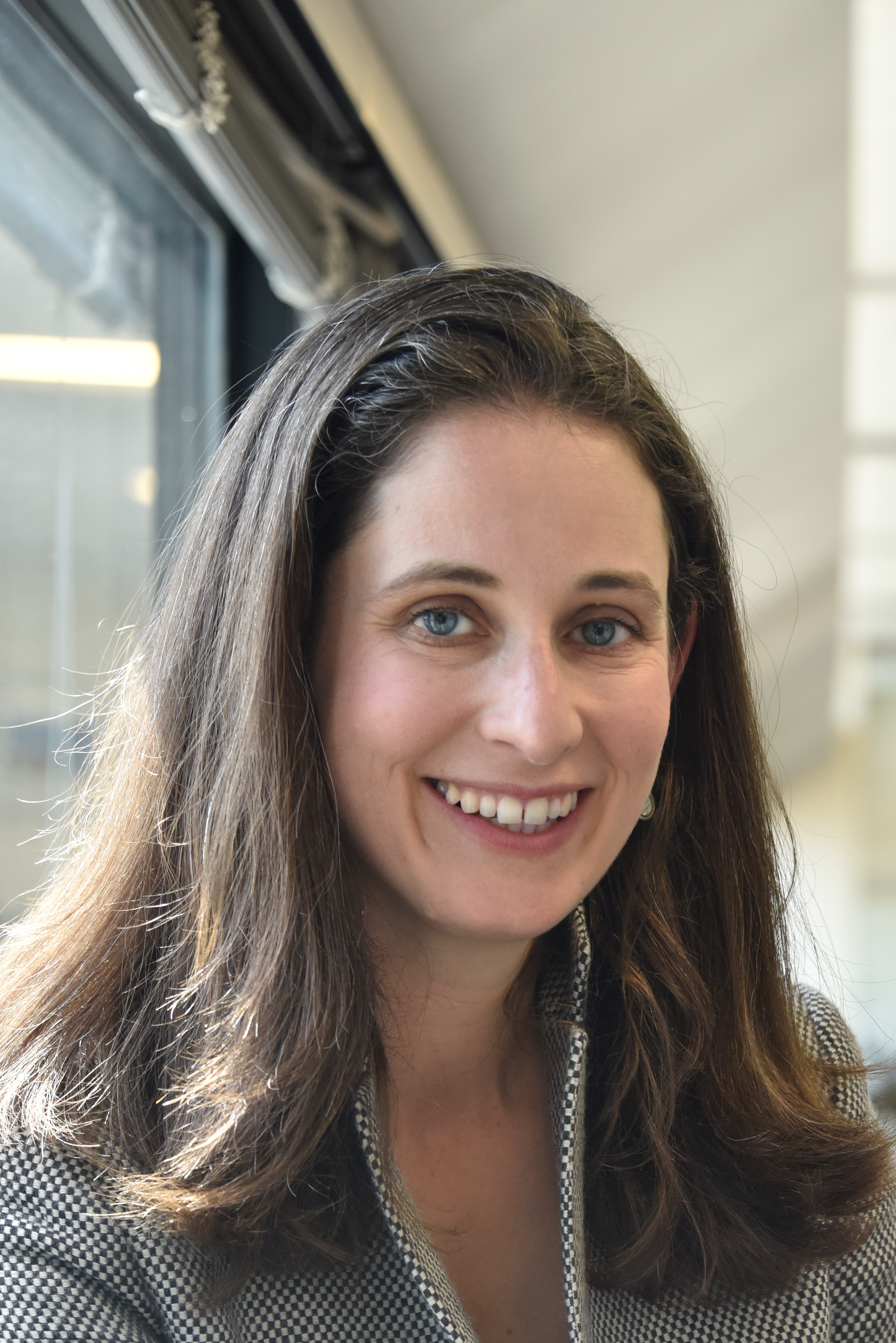
- Aviel in 2022
- Born: February 5, 1980 (age 46); California, United States
- Education: Yale University (BA, MBA, MA)
- Occupations: International development expert; Government official
- Known for: U.S. Alternate Executive Director at the World Bank; President of Inter-American Foundation
- Office: President of the Inter-American Foundation
- Predecessor: Paloma Adams-Allen

Sara Aviel (born February 5, 1980) is an American international economic policy advisor. She is the president & CEO of the Inter-American Foundation, a U.S. foreign assistance agency.

== Early life and education ==
Aviel earned an MBA from Yale University, where she also earned MA and BA degrees in political science.

As an undergraduate student, she and a few other students worked with Médecins Sans Frontières to convince the university and Bristol-Meyers Squibb, which had an exclusive license for Yale's patent, to make Stavudine/d4t (an antiretroviral drug that slowed the development of symptoms of HIV/AIDS) available in South Africa for generic production and below cost. Following that negotiation, Aviel and the other students launched the organization Universities Allied for Essential Medicines to work with universities holding medical patents to expand access to lifesaving drugs.

Aviel has also lectured at Yale University on humanitarian aid and international development.

== Career ==
In her early career, Aviel worked in the field offices and headquarters of international development non-governmental organizations, including social investment fund Root Capital, and humanitarian aid organizations Mercy Corps and CARE Afghanistan.

During the worldwide financial crisis from 2009 to 2011, she served as Senior Advisor to the Secretary of the Treasury Timothy Geithner. Secretary Geithner described Aviel as the "conscience of the Treasury," stating that she "worked the longest hours, traveled on every trip, and brought her exceptionally high standards to helping to run the Treasury."

In 2011, Aviel was appointed director for international economic affairs for the National Economic Council and the National Security Council.

From 2012 to 2015, Aviel represented the United States as the alternate executive director on the executive boards of the World Bank Group institutions, a presidential nomination confirmed the senate May 24, 2012.

From 2015 to 2017, Aviel worked as chief of staff and executive associate director at the Office of Management and Budget.

Following her service in the Obama administration, Aviel founded a private consulting firm, Margalit Strategies, which worked with organizations to carry out strategic planning, develop effective policies, and engage stakeholders. She was also a senior advisor on international development policy at the Center for Strategic and International Studies and a senior fellow on development policy at the Brookings Institution.

=== Inter-American Foundation and conflict over dismissal ===
In 2022, the board of directors of the Inter-American Foundation selected Aviel as its new president & CEO. She was sworn into the role on April 25, 2022.

In February 2025, she was dismissed from the role and succeeded by Peter Marocco. On March 17, Aviel sued over her firing. On April 4, a judge granted a preliminary injunction unwinding the actions of Peter Marocco and reinstating Aviel as President & CEO of the IAF, noting that Marocco's actions were unlawful because he was without authorization to act as representative of the IAF.
