= Pete Marocco =

American government official (born 1975)

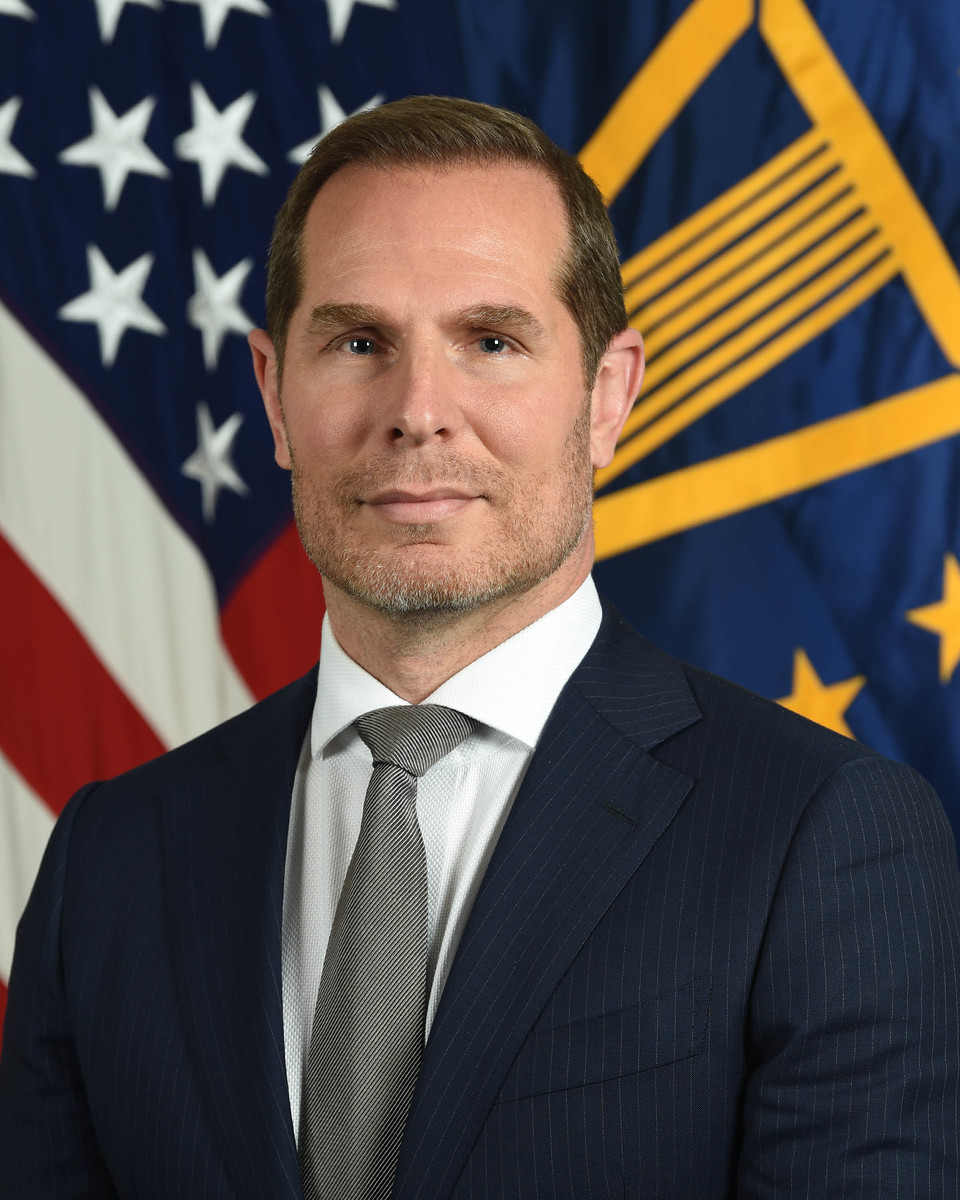
- Official portrait, 2019

Deputy Administrator of the United States Agency for International Development
- In office February 3, 2025 – March 19, 2025
- President: Donald Trump
- Preceded by: Position established
- Succeeded by: Jeremy Lewin

Director of the Office of Foreign Assistance
- In office January 21, 2025 – April 13, 2025
- President: Donald Trump
- Preceded by: Tracy Carson
- Succeeded by: Jeremy Lewin

Personal details
- Born: Peter William Marocco; August 22, 1975 (age 51) Bell County, Texas, U.S.
- Party: Republican
- Education: Florida State University (BA); Kellogg College, Oxford (MSt); Southern Methodist University (MSL)

Peter William Marocco (born August 22, 1975) is an American political appointee who served as director of the Office of Foreign Assistance at the United States Department of State and as deputy administrator of USAID from January to April 2025. Marocco wrote the State Department cable ordering a freeze of all U.S. foreign aid (with exceptions for Israel, humanitarian aid, and other purposes) resulting in furloughs, layoffs and ending operations for almost all U.S.-funded aid projects, and significant confusion among providers funded with U.S. foreign aid. Various Republican figures stated their intent to merge USAID with the State Department.

== First Trump administration ==
Marocco was deputy assistant secretary of state at the Bureau of Conflict and Stabilization Operations from January 7, 2018 to August 16, 2019. While in that position his bureau undertook a government-wide review of U.S. foreign assistance directed toward strategic stabilization efforts and developed a global scanning index intended to give early warning of conflicts and atrocities. In July 2018, he travelled to the Balkans where, as reported by ProPublica, he secretly met with ethnonationalist Bosnian Serb separatist leaders including Milorad Dodik who was at the time under U.S Treasury Department sanctions for opposing peace efforts in the region. This visit had not been approved by the U.S. ambassador. As reported in Foreign Policy magazine, Marocco frequently arranged such meetings on overseas trips without the knowledge of local ambassadors.

In March 2019, Marocco was one of two State Department officials sent to speak at a meeting on international migration policy in Hungary to which neither Germany, France, or the UK sent representatives. Hungary's ruling party Fidesz had been suspended from its European People's Party coalition in the European Parliament just days beforehand. While at the State Department, Marocco was subjected to frequent complaints from the department's inspector general office over workplace concerns including urging others to withhold grant funds from at least one contractor despite regulations to the contrary, as reported in Foreign Policy.

He was also senior advisor for intelligence and security at the U.S. Department of Commerce on a special assignment, advising senior leadership on intelligence and security resources.

Later in 2019, Marocco served as deputy assistant secretary of defense for African affairs, leading U.S. defense policy across the continent, working to counter transnational threats to the U.S., strengthening partner capacity, enhancing cooperation and working with U.S. Africa Command.

After USAID created a Bureau for Conflict Prevention and Stabilization, Marocco was named its head in July 2020. The new bureau's mission was to provide support for civic organizations and independent media in foreign nations, to combat disinformation and to strengthen free elections and the rule of law. While in this position, Marocco reportedly established a confrontational management within USAID, involving disagreements with senior Trump appointees. He repeatedly tried to cancel contracts or freeze payments, accusing USAID employees who complained of "insubordination". Marocco was the subject of a Dissent Channel memo to the USAID administrator, which notably criticized Marocco for micromanagement, vague oral directives, and delayed aid to Ukraine.

In October 2020, Marocco took personal leave, returning to his position in December of that year.

== January 6 Capitol attack allegations ==
In November 2024, D Magazine reported that an individual associated with the Sedition Hunters group claimed to have identified Marocco and his wife Merritt Corrigan from images of those involved in the January 6, 2021, United States Capitol attack. Neither has been charged. Marocco has called the allegations "petty smear tactics and desperate personal attacks."

== Return to private life ==
On January 18, 2021, Marocco filed incorporation papers for Endstate Strategies, LLC as a single-family office and advisory firm for operations management and strategic investment. He became its managing director. By July 2021, Marocco was corporate director of operations at CEC Facilities Group in Irving, Texas.

Marocco was a member of the 2022 class of the Club for Growth Foundation. On April 7 of that year, he was appointed to the Advisory Council on Emergency Medical Services (GETAC).

During the 2023 Conservative Political Action Conference (CPAC) conference in Hungary, Marocco appeared on an episode of the Ben Ferguson talk show. A summary of the episode stated that during his government service, Marocco felt U.S. foreign aid was "undermining the family and indoctrinating children", supporting gay pride, abortion, terrorism and undocumented migrants to the U.S. while ostensibly funding health care, democracy or gender equity. He advocated close monitoring and control of U.S. aid and using social media to counter "indoctrinating and divisive material." Marocco promised that if Donald Trump returned to office he and other conservatives would take inspiration from Hungary's family-friendly policies to address the situation.

Marocco became a leading figure in nonprofit organization Dallas HERO, founded in August 2023. The group developed and supported three amendments to the Dallas city charter that would have established a citizen review of the city manager's performance; increased police staffing and compensation; and given residents the right to sue the city over disagreements about state and local statutory compliance, waiving the city's sovereign immunity. The latter two amendments successfully passed. The mandated spending on hiring police officers and related spending mandated in the charter amendments was the primary reason for a $13.8 million budget shortfall announced by the Dallas city manager in 2026.

== Second Trump administration ==
On December 9, 2024, Politico reported that Marocco was working with the Trump presidential transition team on national security personnel matters.

=== USAID / Office of Foreign Assistance ===
On January 24, 2025, it was reported that Marocco, newly installed as director of the State Department's Office of Foreign Assistance, had sent a cable ordering an immediate pause on new foreign aid spending, as well as a stop-work order for existing grants and contracts.

On January 24, Marocco alleged that USAID conducted payments that violate Executive Order 14169. According to staff members, the allegation appeared to misunderstand USAID's payment systems, in which money may be transferred to other agencies before leaving the federal government days or weeks later (meaning that the payments had likely been approved before the Executive Order). Despite the lack of evidence, on January 27, Marocco, accompanied by officials from the U.S. DOGE Service Temporary Organization, successfully pressured Jason Gray to put on leave 57 senior USAID career officials. They were escorted from their offices by security personnel and their government email accounts were frozen. DOGE members said they would not allow them to come back, regardless of the evidence. On January 30, Marocco echoed DOGE's demand to lock every USAID employee worldwide out of the agency's systems, including phones and emails.

On February 3, 2025, Secretary of State Marco Rubio informed the leadership of the congressional Foreign Affairs and Appropriations committees that he had designated Marocco to act as USAID deputy administrator and to begin a review and possible reorganization of its operations. According to Rubio, this review could include suspending or eliminating programs; closing posts, bureaus or offices; reducing agency workforce; and contracting out or privatizing agency activities.

In early February, Marocco had his initial meeting with a foreign government representative, Hungary's Tristan Azbej, responsible for programs to assist Christians. Azbej stated Marocco had agreed to end programs supporting parties opposed to Orban's government and praised Hungary's programs helping Christians.

On February 18, Marocco declared that his agency would not comply with a judge's order to resume funding for USAID and State Department foreign assistance. Plaintiffs in the case then asked the judge to find the government in civil contempt. On February 25, Marocco stated it would take a matter of weeks to restart U.S. aid disbursements due to "complicated" payment systems, though the plaintiffs argued these complications were due to the government's own actions in stopping payments in the first place and then circumventing court orders to restart them.

In a separate court case, U.S. District Judge Carl J. Nichols said Marocco had created "a mess" for USAID employees stationed overseas with contradictory sworn statements regarding their eligibility for government benefits including emergency medical services, though Nichols later declared he was satisfied with Marocco's assurances regarding the matter and lifted his stay preventing USAID from placing workers on leave and giving them 30 days to relocate from their foreign assignments.

On April 13, 2025, a senior US officials told Reuters that Marocco was leaving the State Department. Without providing explanations, other sources said Marocco may have been pushed out. Other US officials and administration supporters told Politico that Marocco's departure involved tensions between Rubio, his staff and supporters of the MAGA movement. He was succeeded in his role as director of the Office of Foreign Assistance by Jeremy Lewin, serving in an acting capacity; Lewin had previously been named USAID’s chief operating officer.

=== Inter-American Foundation ===
On February 28, 2025, the Trump administration notified the Inter-American Foundation (IAF) that it was replacing both its president and CEO and all of its board members with Marocco. By the evening of March 3, Marocco and staffers from the U.S. DOGE Service Temporary Organization (USDSTO) had reportedly placed most IAF employees on paid administrative leave, accessed IAF systems and records and cancelled all IAF contracts and grants. The American Federation of Government Employees, representing IAF workers, was considering legal options in response to the irregular actions. On April 4, US District Court Judge Loren L. AliKhan issued a preliminary injunction reinstating Sara Aviel as head of IAF and voiding Marocco's actions regarding the foundation.

=== US African Development Foundation ===
Also on February 28, the Trump administration attempted to appoint Marocco to run the US African Development Foundation (USADF). On March 5, 2025, Marocco and five USDSTO staffers were turned away from the USADF offices by foundation security staff. Foundation president Ward Brehm, who was not present, wrote to a USDSTO staffer that he had instructed his staff not to allow such meetings without him and that he looked forward to working with Marocco should he be nominated to the USADF board and confirmed by the Senate.

On the morning of March 6, Marocco and USDSTO staffers returned to the USADF offices accompanied by five individuals reportedly from the US Marshals Service, entered the facility and reportedly changed the locks. In a statement to The Washington Post, USADF declared it would "follow the law with the expectation that our staff will be treated with dignity and respect." NBC News questioned whether the armed individuals who accompanied Marocco and the USDSTO staffers were in fact US Marshals. The response from the US Department of Justice was, "We are not making a statement at this time. We do request that you please verify with your sources that your reporting would be accurate."

Later that day, Brehm filed suit against Trump, USDSTO, Marocco and the heads of the White House Presidential Personnel Office and the US General Services Administration seeking a temporary restraining order (TRO) barring them from entering the foundation offices or removing him as president and declaring attempts to do so beyond their legal authority. US District Judge Richard J. Leon issued an administrative stay the same day ordering that Brehm not be removed from his position and Marocco or any other person not be appointed in his place pending a hearing on March 11. While Leon denied the motion for a TRO stating that it did not meet the threshold for showing immediate and irreparable harm, he required USDSTO staffers to be available for testimony under oath as to the actions taken to maintain USADF's "minimum presence and function required by law." He also noted that the legal authorities the government cited in its response to the motion ignored Congressional amendments and U.S. Supreme Court precedent. Both sides were ordered to confer and state their positions on further action by March 12. On June 10, 2025, Leon ruled that Brehm lacked standing to challenge Marocco's appointment as he had been legally removed from his position beforehand.

== Personal life ==
At age seventeen, Peter Marocco enlisted in the Marines, becoming a platoon sergeant with the 3d Force Reconnaissance Company in Mobile, Alabama.

He has a Bachelor of Arts in international affairs from Florida State University, a Master of Studies in international human rights law from Kellogg College, Oxford in 2009, a Master of Legal Studies in international and comparative law from the Dedman School of Law at Southern Methodist University. He also has a postgraduate certificate in international security from the Freeman Spogli Institute for International Studies at Stanford University. His Oxford dissertation was on the law of armed conflict and unmanned aerial targeting systems.

Marocco is married to Merritt Corrigan. Corrigan worked for Hungary's embassy in the U.S. and left employment as White House liaison for USAID in August 2020 after media coverage of her previous statements criticizing LGBTQ rights, feminism, and liberal democracy.

In 2015–2016, Marocco led humanitarian operations for the Nazarene Fund, a charity founded by Glenn Beck that works to extract Christians from areas in the Middle East where they may face persecution. In August 2017, Marocco served as the Texas director of logistics for the statewide Hurricane Harvey response.

For 17 years, Marocco has been embattled with the interior designers of his Florida properties.
