= 2006 Wisconsin gubernatorial election =

- November 7, 2006
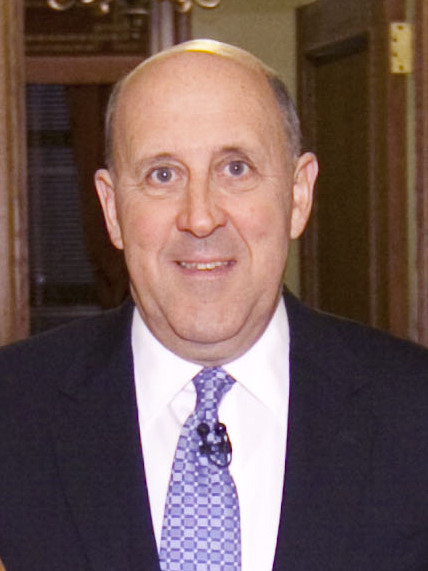

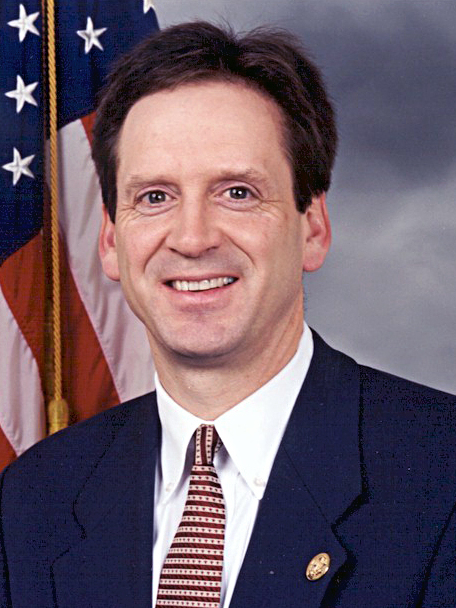
Nominee	Jim Doyle	Mark Green
Party	Democratic	Republican
Running mate	Barbara Lawton	Jean Hundertmark
Popular vote	1,139,115	979,427
Percentage	52.70%	45.31%
- Doyle: 30–40% 40–50% 50–60% 60–70% 70–80% 80–90% >90% Green: 40–50% 50–60% 60–70% 70–80% 80–90% >90% Tie: 40–50% 50% No data
Governor before election
Jim Doyle
Democratic
Elected Governor
Jim Doyle
Democratic

The 2006 Wisconsin gubernatorial election was held on November 7, 2006. Incumbent Democratic Governor Jim Doyle ran for re-election to a second term in office. He was unopposed in the Democratic primary, and faced U.S. Representative Mark Green, who was unopposed in the Republican primary, in the general election. The campaign between Doyle and Green was competitive and hotly contested, but Doyle, whose approval ratings hovered around 50%, had the upper hand. In the end, Doyle defeated Green by a fairly comfortable margin, improving on his 2002 victory in the process.

== Democratic primary ==
=== Governor ===
==== Candidates ====
- Jim Doyle, incumbent governor of Wisconsin

==== Results ====
Democratic gubernatorial primary results
Party	Candidate	Votes	%
Democratic	Jim Doyle (incumbent)	318,523	99.30%
Democratic	Scattering	2,259	0.70%
Total votes		320,782	100.00%

=== Lieutenant governor ===
==== Candidates ====
- Barbara Lawton, incumbent lieutenant governor

==== Results ====
Democratic lieutenant gubernatorial primary results
Party	Candidate	Votes	%
Democratic	Barbara Lawton (incumbent)	287,616	99.71%
Democratic	Scattering	834	0.29%
Total votes		288,450	100.00%

== Republican primary ==
=== Governor ===
==== Candidates ====
===== Nominee =====
- Mark Green, U.S. representative from the 8th district

===== Withdrew =====
- Scott Walker, Milwaukee County executive and former state representative

===== Declined =====
- Tommy Thompson, former governor (1987–2001) and former U.S. secretary of health and human services (2001–2005)

==== Results ====
Republican gubernatorial primary results
Party	Candidate	Votes	%
Republican	Mark Green	233,216	99.66%
Republican	Scattering	804	0.34%
Total votes		234,020	100.00%

=== Lieutenant governor ===
==== Candidates ====
===== Nominee =====
- Jean Hundertmark, member of Wisconsin State Assembly for the 40th district

===== Eliminated in primary =====
- Nick Voegeli

==== Results ====
Republican lieutenant gubernatorial primary results
Party	Candidate	Votes	%
Republican	Jean Hundertmark	119,283	56.02%
Republican	Nick Voegeli	93,391	43.86%
Republican	Scattering	243	0.11%
Total votes		212,917	100.00%

== Green primary ==
=== Governor ===
==== Candidates ====
===== Nominee =====
- Nelson Eisman

==== Results ====
Green Party gubernatorial primary results
Party	Candidate	Votes	%
Green	Nelson Eisman	1,707	98.33%
Green	Scattering	29	1.67%
Total votes		1,736	100.00%

=== Lieutenant governor ===
==== Candidates ====
===== Nominee =====
- Leon Todd

==== Results ====
Green lieutenant gubernatorial primary results
Party	Candidate	Votes	%
Green	Leon Todd	1,676	99.23%
Green	Scattering	13	0.77%
Total votes		1,689	100.00%

== General election ==
=== Predictions ===
Source	Ranking	As of
The Cook Political Report	Tossup	November 6, 2006
Sabato's Crystal Ball	Lean D	November 6, 2006
Rothenberg Political Report	Tossup	November 2, 2006
Real Clear Politics	Lean D	November 6, 2006

=== Polling ===
Source	Date	Jim Doyle (D)	Mark Green (R)
WISC-TV	November 2, 2006	50%	44%
Strategic Vision	October 31, 2006	47%	45%
Zogby/WSJ	October 31, 2006	46.7%	47.2%
Badger Poll	October 30, 2006	50%	36%
Rasmussen	October 29, 2006	48%	44%
Wisconsin Public Radio	October 18, 2006	51%	38%
Strategic Vision	October 11, 2006	46%	43%
Rasmussen	September 25, 2006	47%	44%
Strategic Vision	September 20, 2006	46%	42%
Zogby/WSJ	September 11, 2006	49.4%	45.7%
Zogby/WSJ	August 28, 2006	49.7%	43.1%
Rasmussen	August 20, 2006	49%	41%
Strategic Vision	August 18, 2006	45%	44%
Research 2000	August 17, 2006	48%	38%
Zogby/WSJ	July 24, 2006	49.2%	44.7%
Rasmussen	July 20, 2006	47%	41%
Strategic Vision	July 20, 2006	43%	42%
University of Wisconsin	July 2, 2006	49%	36%
WPRI	June 23, 2006	49%	37%
Zogby/WSJ	June 21, 2006	46.9%	45.1%
Strategic Vision	June 8, 2006	45%	46%
Strategic Vision	May 3, 2006	45%	43%
Rasmussen	April 28, 2006	47%	43%
Strategic Vision	April 13, 2006	43%	43%
WPR/St. Norbert College Survey	March 29 – April 7, 2006	43%	35%
Rasmussen	March 29, 2006	45%	40%
Strategic Vision	March 8, 2006	44%	44%
Rasmussen	February 7, 2006	48%	41%
Strategic Vision	February 1, 2006	44%	43%
Strategic Vision	December 22, 2005	45%	43%
Rasmussen	December 12, 2005	45%	39%
Strategic Vision	November 16, 2005	47%	44%
Strategic Vision	October 21, 2005	47%	43%

=== Debates ===
2006 Wisconsin gubernatorial election debates
No.	Date	Host	Moderator	Link	Democratic	Republican
Key: P Participant A Absent N Not invited I Invited W Withdrawn						
Key: P Participant A Absent N Not invited I Invited W Withdrawn					Jim Doyle	Mark Green
1	Sep. 15, 2006	We The People/Wisconsin	Frederica Freyberg; Mike Jacobs	C-SPAN	P	P
2	Oct. 6, 2006	Wisconsin Broadcasters Association; WMVS-TV		C-SPAN	P	P
3	Oct. 20, 2006	We The People/Wisconsin; WISC-TV		C-SPAN	P	P

=== Results ===
2006 Wisconsin gubernatorial election
Party	Candidate	Votes	%	±%
Democratic	Jim Doyle (incumbent)	1,139,115	52.70%	+7.60%
Republican	Mark Green	979,427	45.31%	+3.92%
Green	Nelson Eisman	40,709	1.88%	−0.60%
	Scattering	2,449	0.11%	
Majority		159,688	7.39%	
Total votes		2,161,700	100.00%	
Democratic hold		Swing	+3.68%	

=== Results by county ===
Doyle became only the third Democrat to carry Door County; the only two previous gubernatorial elections in which it had voted Democratic were 1859 and 1904. Door County would not vote Democratic again until 2022. Doyle was also the first Democrat since Albert G. Schmedeman in 1932 to win Monroe County.

As of 2026, this is the last gubernatorial election in which the Democratic candidate carried the counties of Adams, Barron, Buffalo, Burnett, Chippewa, Clark, Dunn, Forest, Iron, Jackson, Lafayette, Lincoln, Marathon, Monroe, Oneida, Outagamie, Pepin, Pierce, Polk, Price, Rusk, Sawyer, St. Croix, Washburn, and Wood.

County	Jim Doyle Democratic		Mark Green Republican		Nelson Eisman Green		Scattering Write-in		Margin		Total votes cast
County	#	%	#	%	#	%	#	%	#	%	Total votes cast
Adams	4,416	55.91%	3,324	42.08%	150	1.90%	9	0.11%	1,092	13.82%	7,899
Ashland	4,118	65.80%	1,902	30.39%	232	3.71%	6	0.10%	2,216	35.41%	6,258
Barron	8,136	49.81%	7,920	48.49%	271	1.66%	6	0.04%	216	1.32%	16,333
Bayfield	4,653	64.15%	2,468	34.03%	129	1.78%	3	0.04%	2,185	30.13%	7,253
Brown	45,046	48.11%	46,989	50.18%	1,517	1.62%	83	0.09%	-1,943	-2.08%	93,635
Buffalo	3,078	57.40%	2,196	40.95%	83	1.55%	5	0.09%	882	16.45%	5,362
Burnett	3,225	52.15%	2,900	46.90%	59	0.95%	0	0.00%	325	5.26%	6,184
Calumet	9,059	46.74%	9,995	51.57%	320	1.65%	8	0.04%	-936	-4.83%	19,382
Chippewa	11,467	52.56%	9,839	45.10%	502	2.30%	10	0.05%	1,628	7.46%	21,818
Clark	5,758	51.23%	5,152	45.84%	326	2.90%	4	0.04%	606	5.39%	11,240
Columbia	11,662	52.62%	9,936	44.83%	521	2.35%	45	0.20%	1,726	7.79%	22,164
Crawford	3,751	59.25%	2,439	38.52%	128	2.02%	13	0.21%	1,312	20.72%	6,331
Dane	149,661	69.95%	58,302	27.25%	5,645	2.64%	332	0.16%	91,359	42.70%	213,940
Dodge	13,137	42.31%	17,302	55.72%	581	1.87%	29	0.09%	-4,165	-13.41%	31,049
Door	7,592	52.75%	6,479	45.01%	319	2.22%	3	0.02%	1,113	7.73%	14,393
Douglas	10,670	65.52%	5,233	32.14%	376	2.31%	5	0.03%	5,437	33.39%	16,284
Dunn	8,070	55.24%	6,208	42.50%	318	2.18%	12	0.08%	1,862	12.75%	14,608
Eau Claire	22,240	57.16%	15,733	40.43%	889	2.28%	49	0.13%	6,507	16.72%	38,911
Florence	865	44.07%	1,079	54.97%	19	0.97%	0	0.00%	-214	-10.90%	1,963
Fond du Lac	16,073	42.05%	21,515	56.28%	615	1.61%	23	0.06%	-5,442	-14.24%	38,226
Forest	1,853	51.27%	1,712	47.37%	48	1.33%	1	0.03%	141	3.90%	3,614
Grant	9,242	54.52%	7,427	43.81%	283	1.67%	0	0.00%	1,815	10.71%	16,952
Green	7,769	58.67%	5,149	38.89%	304	2.30%	19	0.14%	2,620	19.79%	13,241
Green Lake	3,122	39.09%	4,714	59.03%	144	1.80%	6	0.08%	-1,592	-19.93%	7,986
Iowa	5,630	62.23%	3,267	36.11%	145	1.60%	5	0.06%	2,363	26.12%	9,047
Iron	1,560	56.07%	1,189	42.74%	30	1.08%	3	0.11%	371	13.34%	2,782
Jackson	3,858	55.61%	2,931	42.25%	146	2.10%	3	0.04%	927	13.36%	6,938
Jefferson	14,247	46.01%	16,038	51.79%	640	2.07%	40	0.13%	-1,791	-5.78%	30,965
Juneau	3,969	47.88%	4,101	49.48%	181	2.18%	38	0.46%	-132	-1.59%	8,289
Kenosha	28,338	55.49%	21,737	42.56%	938	1.84%	58	0.11%	6,601	12.93%	51,071
Kewaunee	4,354	48.14%	4,479	49.52%	211	2.33%	1	0.01%	-125	-1.38%	9,045
La Crosse	24,663	57.34%	17,235	40.07%	1,002	2.33%	110	0.26%	7,428	17.27%	43,010
Lafayette	3,344	57.20%	2,405	41.14%	91	1.56%	6	0.10%	939	16.06%	5,846
Langlade	4,184	48.70%	4,276	49.77%	126	1.47%	5	0.06%	-92	-1.07%	8,591
Lincoln	6,019	54.31%	4,713	42.52%	339	3.06%	12	0.11%	1,306	11.78%	11,083
Manitowoc	15,736	48.47%	16,154	49.76%	535	1.65%	38	0.12%	-418	-1.29%	32,463
Marathon	25,836	52.56%	22,186	45.14%	1,121	2.28%	9	0.02%	3,650	7.43%	49,152
Marinette	8,408	49.35%	8,455	49.63%	166	0.97%	8	0.05%	-47	-0.28%	17,037
Marquette	2,879	47.13%	3,095	50.67%	123	2.01%	11	0.18%	-216	-3.54%	6,108
Menominee	886	82.57%	180	16.78%	7	0.65%	0	0.00%	706	65.80%	1,073
Milwaukee	199,536	61.57%	118,949	36.70%	5,019	1.55%	564	0.17%	80,587	24.87%	324,068
Monroe	6,556	48.76%	6,517	48.47%	323	2.40%	50	0.37%	39	0.29%	13,446
Oconto	6,639	46.17%	7,497	52.14%	238	1.66%	4	0.03%	-858	-5.97%	14,378
Oneida	8,372	51.67%	7,425	45.82%	389	2.40%	17	0.10%	947	5.84%	16,203
Outagamie	34,901	50.05%	33,511	48.05%	1,284	1.84%	41	0.06%	1,390	1.99%	69,737
Ozaukee	15,229	36.90%	25,460	61.69%	542	1.31%	43	0.10%	-10,231	-24.79%	41,274
Pepin	1,627	55.70%	1,256	43.00%	38	1.30%	0	0.00%	371	12.70%	2,921
Pierce	7,829	55.30%	6,034	42.62%	284	2.01%	10	0.07%	1,795	12.68%	14,157
Polk	8,128	52.34%	7,103	45.74%	291	1.87%	7	0.05%	1,025	6.60%	15,529
Portage	17,754	61.55%	10,206	35.38%	858	2.97%	27	0.09%	7,548	26.17%	28,845
Price	3,581	55.85%	2,737	42.69%	91	1.42%	3	0.05%	844	13.16%	6,412
Racine	34,968	49.00%	35,286	49.44%	1,055	1.48%	59	0.08%	-318	-0.45%	71,368
Richland	3,489	54.41%	2,814	43.88%	100	1.56%	10	0.16%	675	10.53%	6,413
Rock	33,774	61.26%	20,156	36.56%	1,115	2.02%	84	0.15%	13,618	24.70%	55,129
Rusk	2,968	51.68%	2,622	45.66%	144	2.51%	9	0.16%	346	6.02%	5,743
Sauk	12,232	55.76%	9,148	41.70%	517	2.36%	41	0.19%	3,084	14.06%	21,938
Sawyer	3,218	51.22%	2,965	47.19%	100	1.59%	0	0.00%	253	4.03%	6,283
Shawano	7,236	46.16%	8,227	52.48%	208	1.33%	6	0.04%	-991	-6.32%	15,677
Sheboygan	21,388	45.13%	25,257	53.29%	714	1.51%	38	0.08%	-3,869	-8.16%	47,397
St. Croix	13,392	49.79%	13,117	48.77%	378	1.41%	9	0.03%	275	1.02%	26,896
Taylor	3,506	48.31%	3,551	48.93%	199	2.74%	2	0.03%	-45	-0.62%	7,258
Trempealeau	5,557	58.57%	3,725	39.26%	198	2.09%	8	0.08%	1,832	19.31%	9,488
Vernon	6,034	57.34%	4,240	40.29%	234	2.22%	15	0.14%	1,794	17.05%	10,523
Vilas	4,799	45.15%	5,623	52.90%	202	1.90%	6	0.06%	-824	-7.75%	10,630
Walworth	14,154	41.98%	18,781	55.71%	729	2.16%	50	0.15%	-4,627	-13.72%	33,714
Washburn	3,323	50.73%	3,135	47.86%	87	1.33%	6	0.09%	188	2.87%	6,551
Washington	17,219	32.29%	35,262	66.13%	803	1.51%	41	0.08%	-18,043	-33.84%	53,325
Waukesha	61,402	34.86%	112,243	63.73%	2,320	1.32%	149	0.08%	-50,841	-28.87%	176,114
Waupaca	8,767	45.24%	10,296	53.13%	307	1.58%	10	0.05%	-1,529	-7.89%	19,380
Waushara	4,155	46.55%	4,590	51.42%	170	1.90%	11	0.12%	-435	-4.87%	8,926
Winnebago	32,765	50.49%	30,629	47.20%	1,413	2.18%	85	0.13%	2,136	3.29%	64,892
Wood	16,043	54.27%	12,711	43.00%	779	2.64%	26	0.09%	3,332	11.27%	29,559
Total	1,139,115	52.70%	979,427	45.31%	40,709	1.88%	2,449	0.11%	159,688	7.39%	2,161,700

==== Counties that flipped Republican to Democratic ====
- Burnett (largest village: Grantsburg)
- Clark (largest city: Neillsville)
- Chippewa (largest city: Chippewa Falls)
- Door (largest city: Sturgeon Bay)
- Outagamie (largest city: Appleton)
- Sawyer (largest city: Hayward)
- St. Croix (Largest city: Hudson)
- Winnebago (largest city: Oshkosh)

==== Counties that flipped from Libertarian to Democratic ====
- Monroe (largest city: Sparta)

==== Counties that flipped from Libertarian to Republican ====
- Juneau (largest city: Mauston)

==== Counties that flipped from Democratic to Republican ====
- Langlade (largest city: Antigo)
- Manitowoc (largest city: Manitowoc)
- Marquette (largest city: Montello)
- Racine (largest city: Racine)
- Taylor (largest city: Medford)

== See also ==
- U.S. gubernatorial elections, 2006
