= Bill K. Perrin =

American diplomat

Bill K. Perrin (1938–2005) was an American non-career appointee who served as the American ambassador extraordinary and plenipotentiary to Cyprus from 1988 until 1989. He resigned for health reasons.

Perrin was also the US State Department's deputy assistant secretary for Near Eastern and South Asian affairs. At the Peace Corps, he was director in Belize, director for the Eastern Caribbean and regional director for Africa. Perrin also served as the fourth President of the Inter-American Foundation.
