= Title 22 of the Code of Federal Regulations =

U.S. federal rules and regulations on foreign relations

CFR Title 22 – Foreign Relations is one of fifty titles comprising the United States Code of Federal Regulations (CFR), containing the principal set of rules and regulations issued by federal agencies regarding foreign relations. It is available in digital and printed form, and can be referenced online using the Electronic Code of Federal Regulations (e-CFR).

== Structure ==
The table of contents, as reflected in the e-CFR updated February 24, 2014, is as follows:

Volume	Chapter	Parts	Regulatory Entity
1	I	1–199	Department of State
	II	200–299	Agency for International Development
2	III	300–399	Peace Corps
	IV	400–499	International Joint Commission, United States and Canada
	V	500–599	Broadcasting Board of Governors
	VI	700–799	Overseas Private Investment Corporation
	IX	900–999	Foreign Service Grievance Board
	X	1000–1099	Inter-American Foundation
	XI	1100-1199	International Boundary and Water Commission, United States and Mexico, United States Section
	XII	1200–1299	United States International Development Cooperation Agency
	XIII	1300–1399	Millennium Challenge Corporation
	XIV	1400–1499	Foreign Service Labor Relations Board; Federal Labor Relations Authority; General Counsel of the Federal Labor Relations Authority; and the Foreign Service Impasse Disputes Panel
	XV	1500–1599	African Development Foundation
	XVI	1600–1699	Japan-United States Friendship Commission
	XVII	1700–1799	United States Institute of Peace
