= Mark Green (Wisconsin politician) =

American politician and diplomat (born 1960)

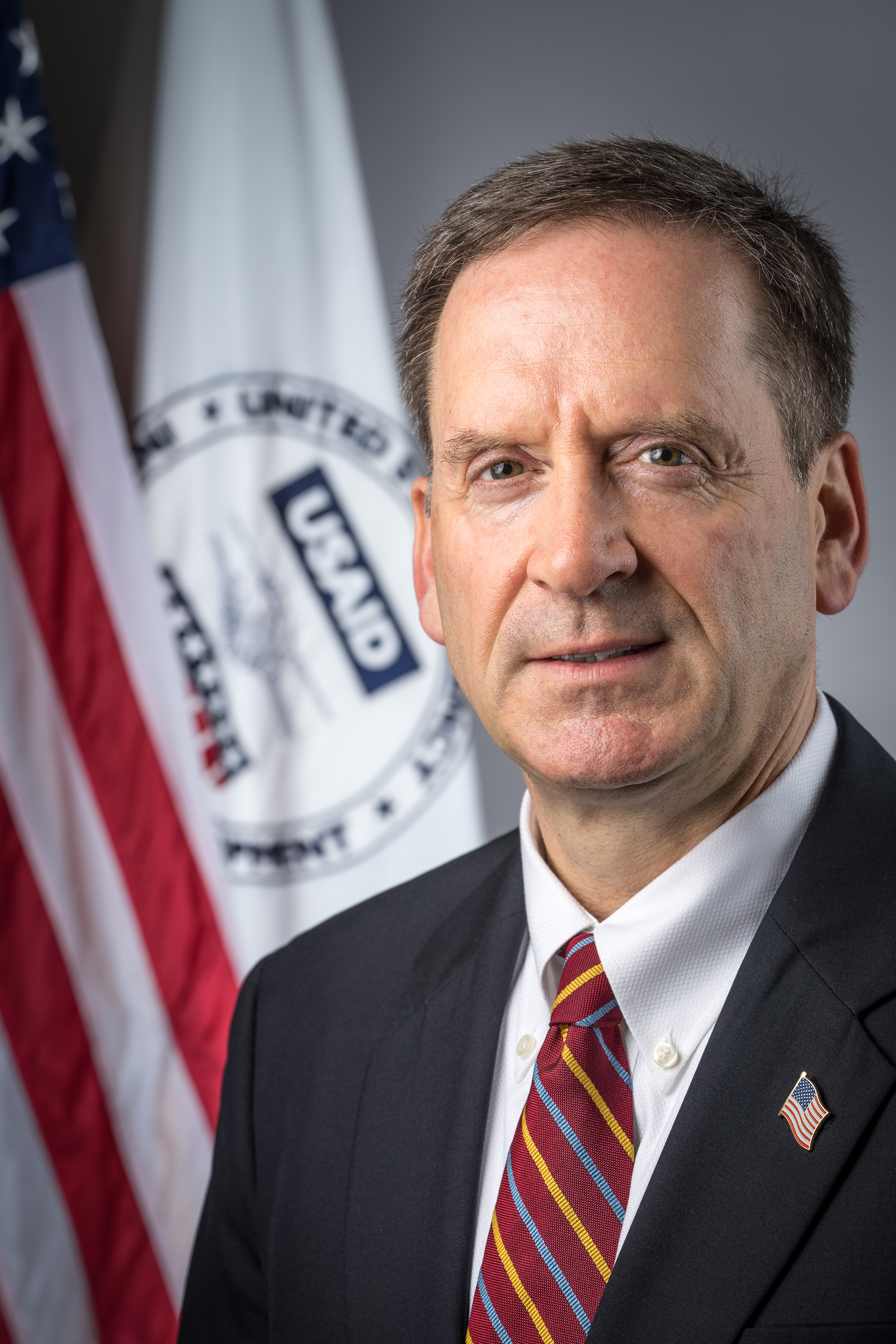
- Official portrait, 2017

President of the Woodrow Wilson International Center for Scholars
- In office March 15, 2021 – April 1, 2025
- President: Joe Biden; Donald Trump
- Preceded by: Jane Harman
- Succeeded by: Natasha Jacome

Executive Director of the McCain Institute for International Leadership
- In office April 11, 2020 – March 14, 2021
- Preceded by: Kurt Volker
- Succeeded by: Josette Sheeran

18th Administrator of the United States Agency for International Development
- In office August 7, 2017 – April 10, 2020
- President: Donald Trump
- Preceded by: Wade Warren (acting)
- Succeeded by: John Barsa (acting)

United States Ambassador to Tanzania
- In office September 12, 2007 – January 20, 2009
- President: George W. Bush
- Preceded by: Michael Retzer
- Succeeded by: Alfonso Lenhardt

Member of the U.S. House of Representatives from Wisconsin's 8th district
- In office January 4, 1999 – January 3, 2007
- Preceded by: Jay W. Johnson
- Succeeded by: Steve Kagen

Member of the Wisconsin State Assembly from the 4th district
- In office January 4, 1993 – January 3, 1999
- Preceded by: John Ainsworth
- Succeeded by: Phil Montgomery

Personal details
- Born: Mark Andrew Green; June 1, 1960 (age 66) Boston, Massachusetts, U.S.
- Party: Republican
- Spouse: Sue Green (m. 1985)
- Children: 3
- Education: University of Wisconsin, Eau Claire (BA); University of Wisconsin, Madison (JD)

Mark Andrew Green (born June 1, 1960) is an American politician and diplomat. He served as president and CEO of the Woodrow Wilson International Center for Scholars from March 15, 2021 to April 1, 2025. Previously he was executive director of the McCain Institute for International Leadership and Administrator of the United States Agency for International Development. He served in the Wisconsin State Assembly from 1993 to 1999, was a Republican member of the United States House of Representatives from 1999 to 2007, representing Wisconsin's 8th congressional district, ran unsuccessfully for governor of Wisconsin in 2006, and held the post of United States Ambassador to Tanzania from August 2007 until January 2009. Green served as president of the International Republican Institute from 2014 to 2017 and sits on the board of directors of the Millennium Challenge Corporation.

The United States Senate confirmed Green as administrator of the USAID on August 3, 2017. He was sworn in the following August 7. On March 16, 2020, Green submitted a resignation letter to President Trump. He left the office on April 10, 2020.

== Early life and education ==
Green was born in Boston, Massachusetts, to Jeremy and Elizabeth Green. His father is from South Africa, and Green spent time there as a child. His family moved often, and as a child he lived in Jersey City, New Jersey; Cincinnati, Ohio; England; South Africa; and Australia. He attended Abbot Pennings High School in De Pere, Wisconsin.

Green received a bachelor's degree from the University of Wisconsin–Eau Claire in 1983 and a Juris Doctor from the University of Wisconsin–Madison in 1987. In law school, he served as a managing editor of the Wisconsin Law Review and won the Justice Robert Jackson Award from the Washington, D.C., Foreign Law Society for "Best Published Student Writing on a Foreign Law Subject".

== Career ==
After graduating from law school, he joined the law firm Godfrey & Kahn S.C. at their Green Bay, Wisconsin office.

=== Wisconsin State Assembly ===
In 1992, Green was elected to the Wisconsin State Assembly, where he served District 4 for six years and rose to the position of chairman of the Republican Caucus. He chaired the Judiciary Committee, served on the Board of the Wisconsin Housing and Economic Development Authority (WHEDA), and helped reform state housing policy. Green's legislative work won him awards from the Wisconsin and American Farm Bureau Federations, the United States Chamber of Commerce, the National Federation of Independent Business, the National Rifle Association of America, the Wisconsin Builders Association, the Wisconsin Medical Society, Citizens Against Government Waste, Watchdogs of the Treasury, and the Seniors Coalition.

=== U.S. House of Representatives ===
Green first ran for Congress in 1998, defeating first-term Representative Jay W. Johnson, with 54% of the vote. Green won each of his next three elections with 70% or more of the vote. He represented Wisconsin's 8th congressional district from the 106th Congress until the 109th Congress.

Green was a member of the House International Relations Committee in the 107th to 109th sessions of Congress. He helped draft the Millennium Challenge Act, the Global Access to HIV/AIDS Prevention, Awareness and Treatment Act of 2001, and the U.S. Leadership Against HIV/AIDS, Tuberculosis and Malaria Act. He co-founded the Victory in Iraq Caucus.

Green worked to raise awareness about human rights violations by the communist Pathet Lao government in Laos against the ethnic minority Hmong people and others suffering under authoritarian governments, and about religious freedom issues in Laos and Southeast Asia. Many Hmong Americans had resettled in Wisconsin as political refugees following the Vietnam War.

In January 1999, Green was appointed an Assistant Majority Whip by then-House Majority Whip Tom DeLay, and then re-appointed by House Majority Whip Roy Blunt.

While a U.S. Representative, Green was a member of the House Judiciary Committee, vice chair of the Crime, Terrorism and Homeland Security Subcommittee, and co-founded the bipartisan Faith-Based Caucus. He co-led the floor debate on the "Faith-Based Initiative", a plan to reenlist faith-based communities in the national fight against poverty and social crises. As part of that effort, he co-founded the bipartisan Faith-Based Caucus. Green helped expand the Violence Against Women Act, and wrote the "Two Strikes and You're Out Child Protection Act", which would have established a mandatory sentence of life imprisonment for twice-convicted child sex offenders. He also cosponsored the Debbie Smith Act, which was meant to assist law enforcement in modernizing DNA databases, and the Adam Walsh Child Protection and Safety Act. He supported the death penalty and the No Child Left Behind Act.

=== 2006 Wisconsin gubernatorial campaign ===
Green unsuccessfully ran for Governor of Wisconsin against incumbent Governor Jim Doyle, a Democrat. Green had no opponent in the Republican Party primary. Then-Milwaukee County Executive Scott Walker dropped out of the GOP primary on March 24, 2006, citing a lack of campaign funds (he would later win the governorship in 2010). After the primary, Green was joined on the ticket by State Rep. Jean Hundertmark of Clintonville, who had defeated Nick Voegeli in the primary for lieutenant governor. Green received 979,427 votes to Doyle's 1,139,115 votes.

=== U.S. Ambassador to Tanzania ===
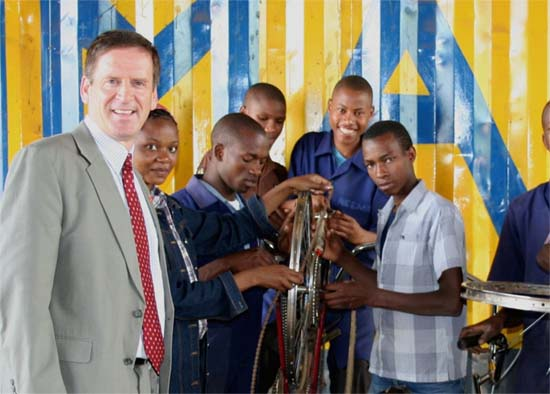
Green visiting Tumaini Orphan Vocational Training Center in Arusha on November 16, 2007, where a Peace Corps volunteer is teaching life skills to students

On June 8, 2007, President George W. Bush announced Green's nomination as United States Ambassador to Tanzania. Senator Russ Feingold, chairman of the African Affairs Subcommittee of the Senate Foreign Relations Committee, held hearings on Green's nomination as ambassador on June 19.

Senator Chris Dodd, a member of the Senate Foreign Relations Committee, put a hold on Green's nomination to replace Michael Retzer as ambassador, citing Retzer's action of revoking the country clearance of Peace Corps Country Director Christine Djondo as interference in the independence of the Peace Corps. On June 28, when the State Department provided a letter of apology to Djondo, Dodd released his hold. On August 3, 2007, the Senate confirmed Green by unanimous consent. He resigned as ambassador to Tanzania upon Barack Obama's inauguration as president.

==== Tenure ====
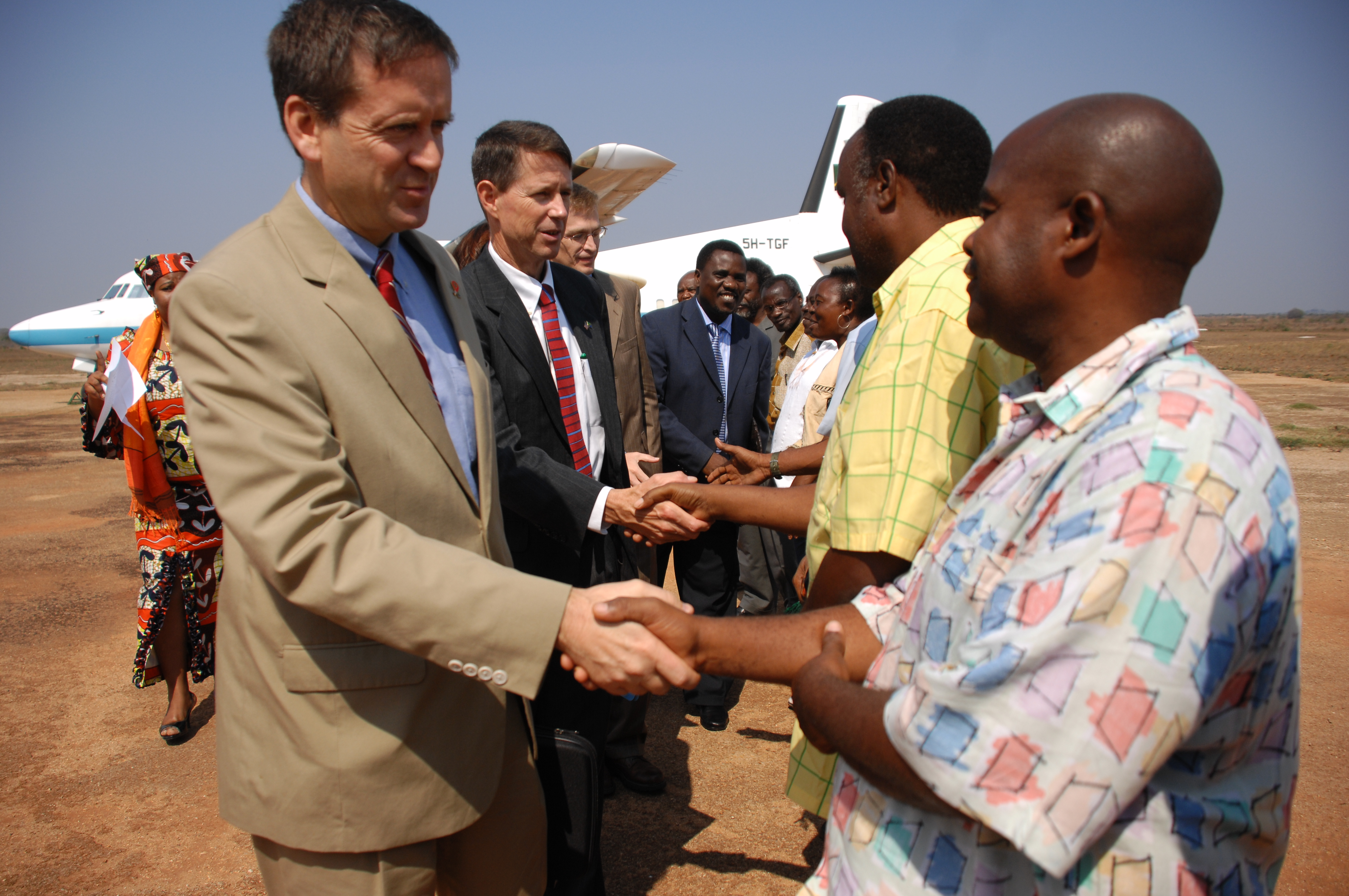
Green meeting with Tanzanian ministers

During Green's tenure, President George W. Bush visited Tanzania in February 2008, the first official visit by a sitting U.S. president; Tanzania hosted Sullivan Summit VIII, the first Sullivan Summit in East Africa; President Kikwete visited the White House in August 2008; and the largest Millennium Challenge Corporation (MCC) Compact in history was signed.

During his tenure, Green helped craft the Millennium Challenge Act, which expanded America's commitment to invest in developing nations that are pursuing political and economic reforms. He worked to enact the Global Access to HIV/AIDS Prevention, Awareness and Treatment Act of 2001 and the U.S. Leadership Against HIV/AIDS, Tuberculosis and Malaria Act. He worked on legislation covering policy areas like international terrorism and human trafficking. In 2005, Green worked with the National Democratic Institute for International Affairs, the International Republican Institute and the State Department as an election observer in Kenya. He also traveled to West Africa with the Academy for Educational Development, Oxfam and Save the Children to work on programs related to women's health and education.

== Nongovernmental Organization (NGO) work ==
Green was a director of the policy center of Malaria No More, a global effort to eliminate malaria.

He served as a senior director of the U.S. Global Leadership Coalition (USGLC) from 2011 until his appointment in 2017. USGLC is a foreign policy foundation that describes itself as "a broad-based influential network of over 500 businesses and NGOs; national security and foreign policy experts; and business, faith-based, academic, military, and community leaders in all 50 states who support strategic investments to elevate development and diplomacy alongside defense in order to build a better, safer world".

He served as president and CEO of Initiative for Global Development, a nonprofit organization aimed at reducing world poverty, from 2013 to 2014.

From 2014 to 2017, Green served as president of the International Republican Institute (IRI), an NGO chaired by Arizona Sen. John McCain.

== Administrator of USAID ==
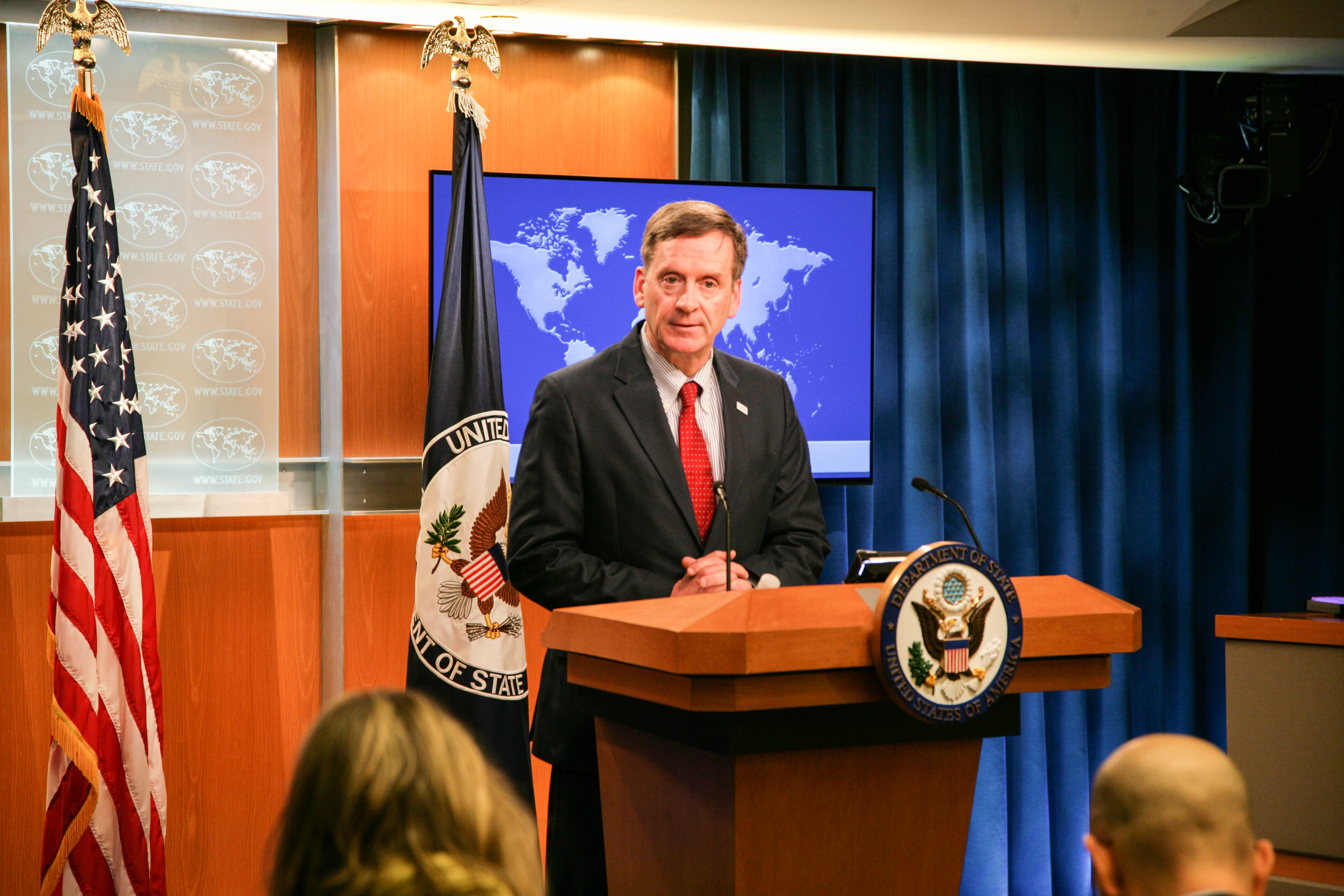
Green speaks to the press in March 2019

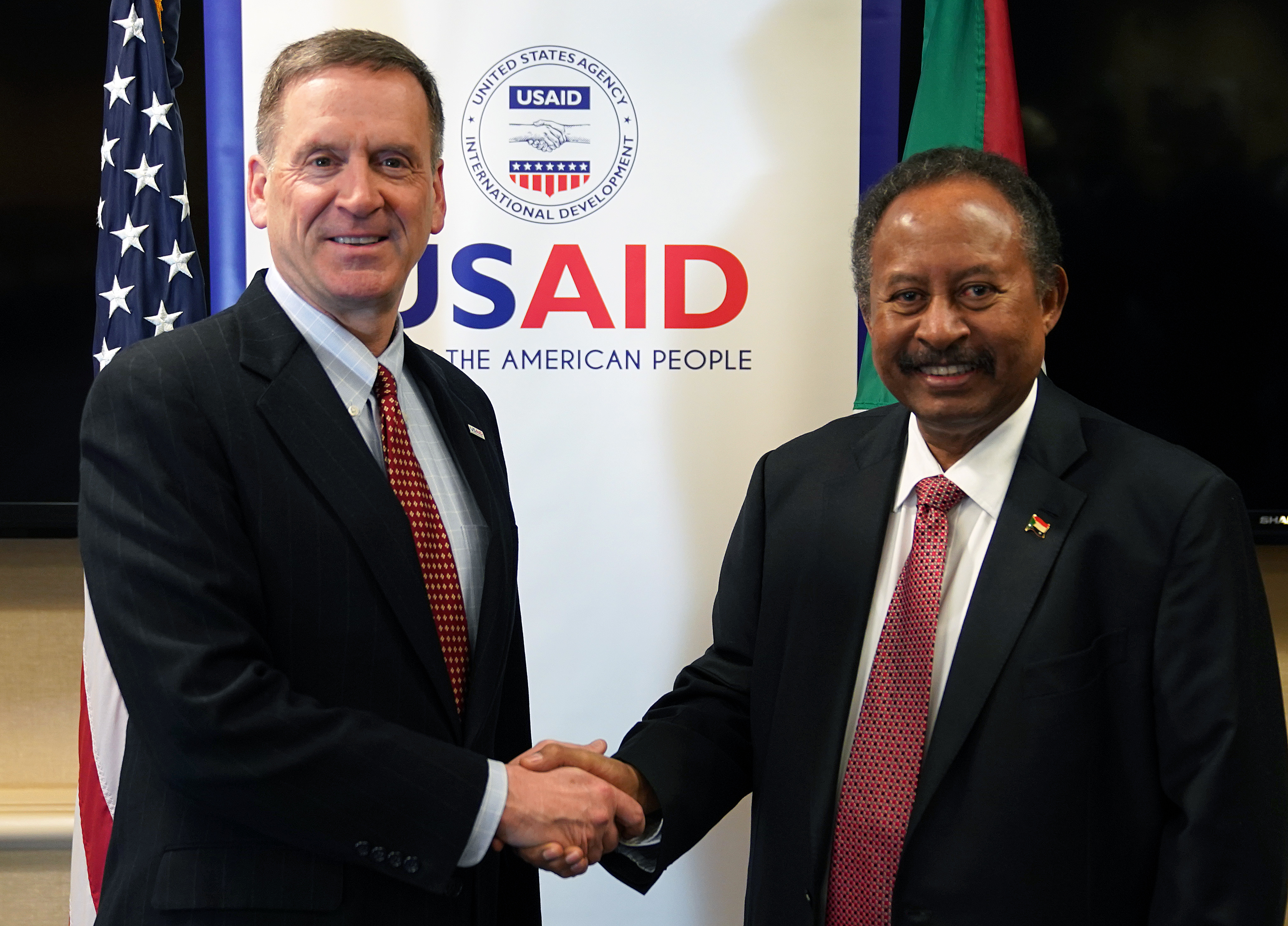
Green with Sudanese Prime Minister Abdalla Hamdok in December 2019

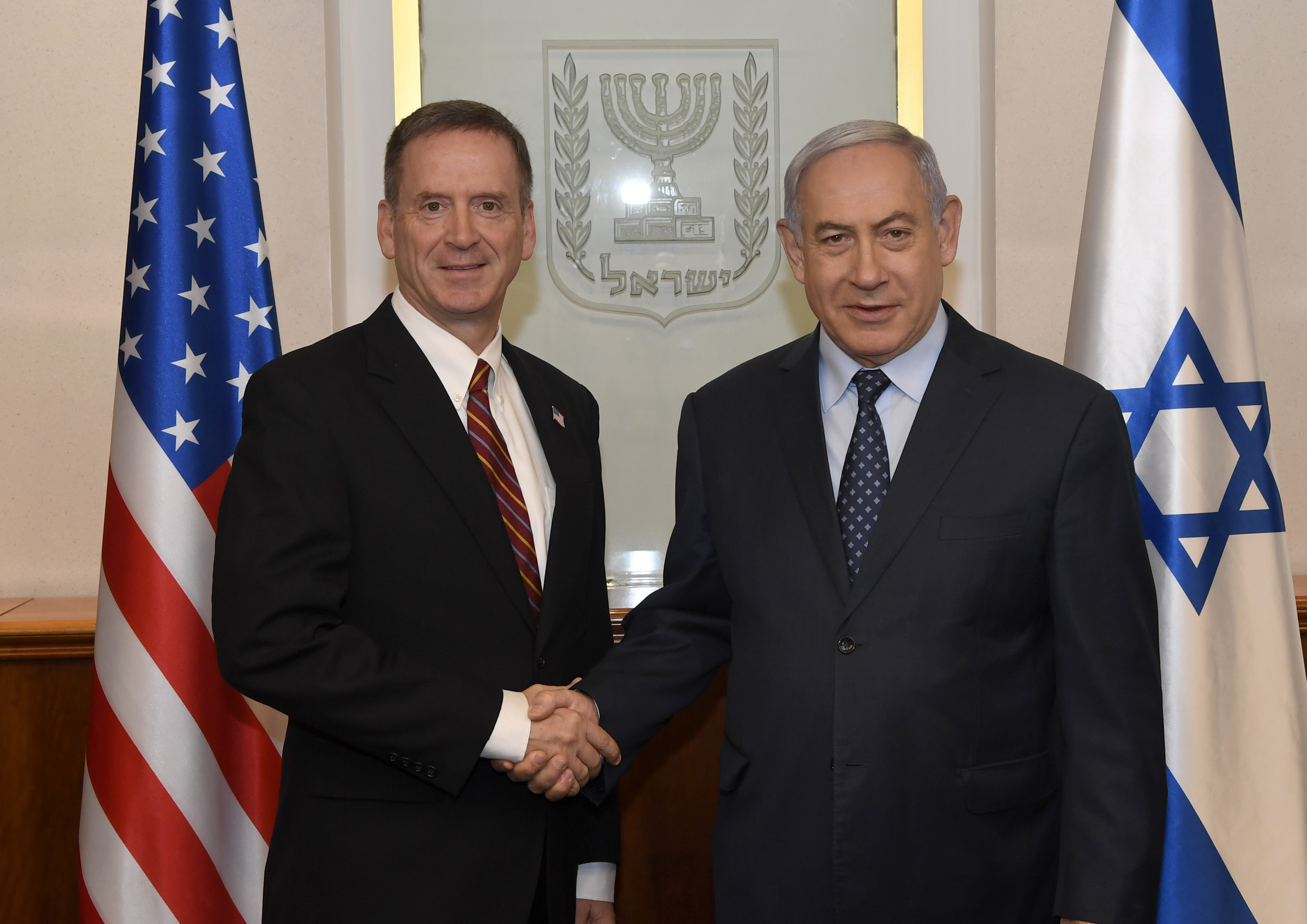
Green with Israeli Prime Minister Benjamin Netanyahu in August 2019

=== Nomination ===
In May 2017, Green was nominated by President Donald Trump to lead the United States Agency for International Development. His nomination was backed by aid organizations and politicians, with The Guardian writing that Green "is well regarded and known for his bipartisan approach to foreign assistance".

== Personal life ==
Mark and Susan (née Keske) Green wed on August 5, 1985, and have three children. Green and his wife served as volunteer teachers in Kenya with WorldTeach in 1987 and 1988, and while in Kenya, visited rural areas of neighboring countries.

== Electoral history ==
Wisconsin gubernatorial election, 2006
Party	Candidate	Votes	%	±%
Democratic	Jim Doyle (Incumbent)	1,139,115	52.8	+7.7
Republican	Mark Green	979,427	45.3	

U.S. House of Representatives
Preceded by Jay Johnson	Member of the U.S. House of Representatives from Wisconsin's 8th congressional district 1999–2007	Succeeded by Steve Kagen
Party political offices
Preceded by Scott McCallum	Republican nominee for Governor of Wisconsin; 2006	Succeeded by Scott Walker
Diplomatic posts
Preceded by Michael Retzer	United States Ambassador to Tanzania; 2007–2009	Succeeded by Alfonso Lenhardt
Political offices
Preceded by Wade Warren; Acting	Administrator of the United States Agency for International Development; 2017–2020	Succeeded by John Barsa; Acting
U.S. order of precedence (ceremonial)
Preceded by Scott Klug as Former U.S. Representative	Order of precedence of the United States as Former U.S. Representative	Succeeded by Jim Bates as Former U.S. Representative
