= Ward Brehm =

American businessman

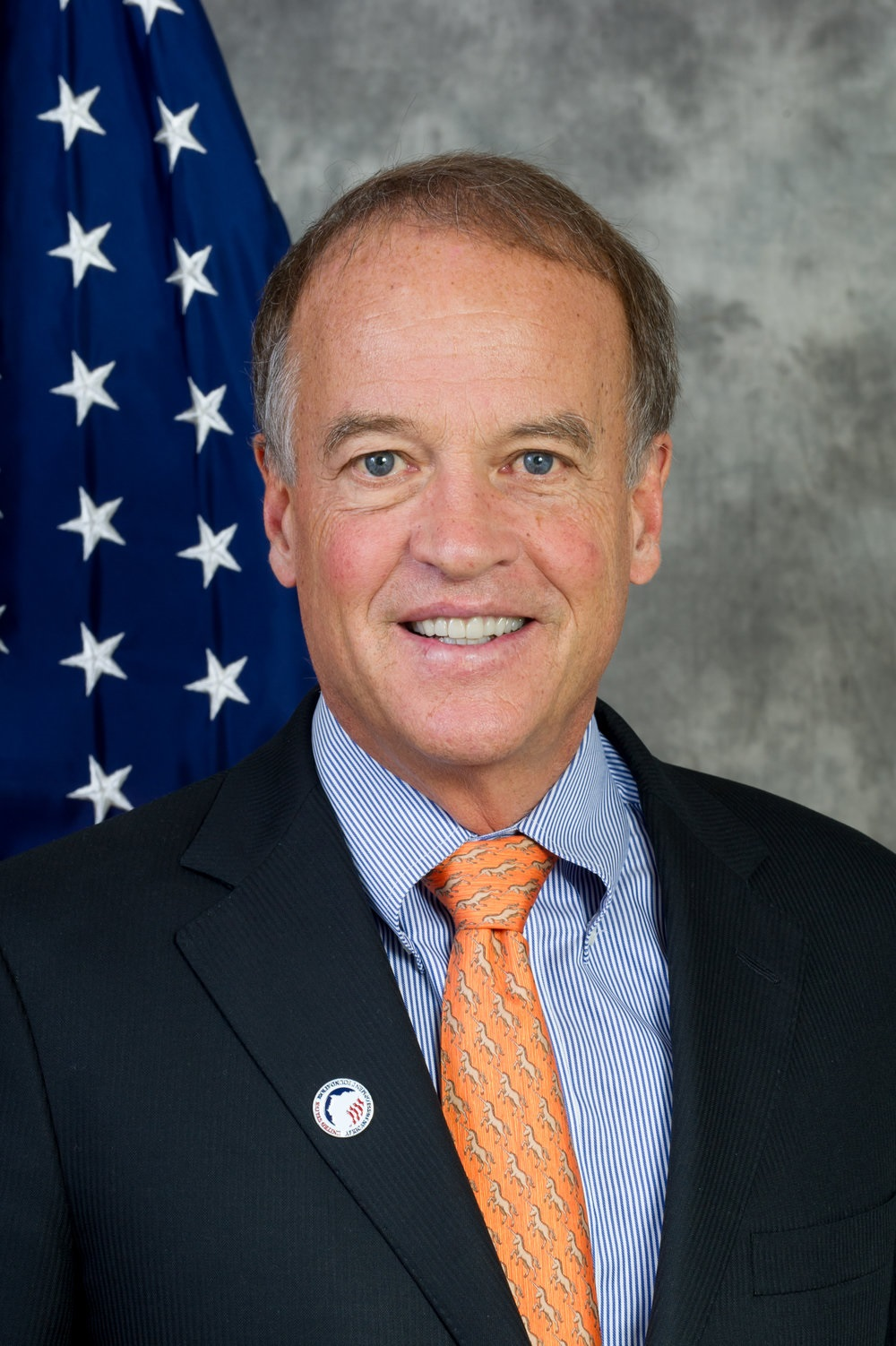
Official portrait, 2016, depicting Ward next to an American flag

Ward Brehm is a Minnesota based businessman who has served as United States African Development Foundation (USADF) chairman under four administrations. He is a recipient of the Presidential Citizens Medal.

== Career ==
Brehm served four U.S. presidents in his role with USADF since he was first appointed to its board as chairman by President Bush in 2004.

He represented the United States as part of three presidential delegations to the African continent after attending inaugurations of the presidents of the Democratic Republic of Congo and Benin, and the Leon Sullivan Summit in Tanzania.

In 2008, Brehm was awarded the Presidential Citizens Medal – the country's second-highest civilian honor – for his work in Africa at an Oval Office ceremony with President and Mrs. Bush.

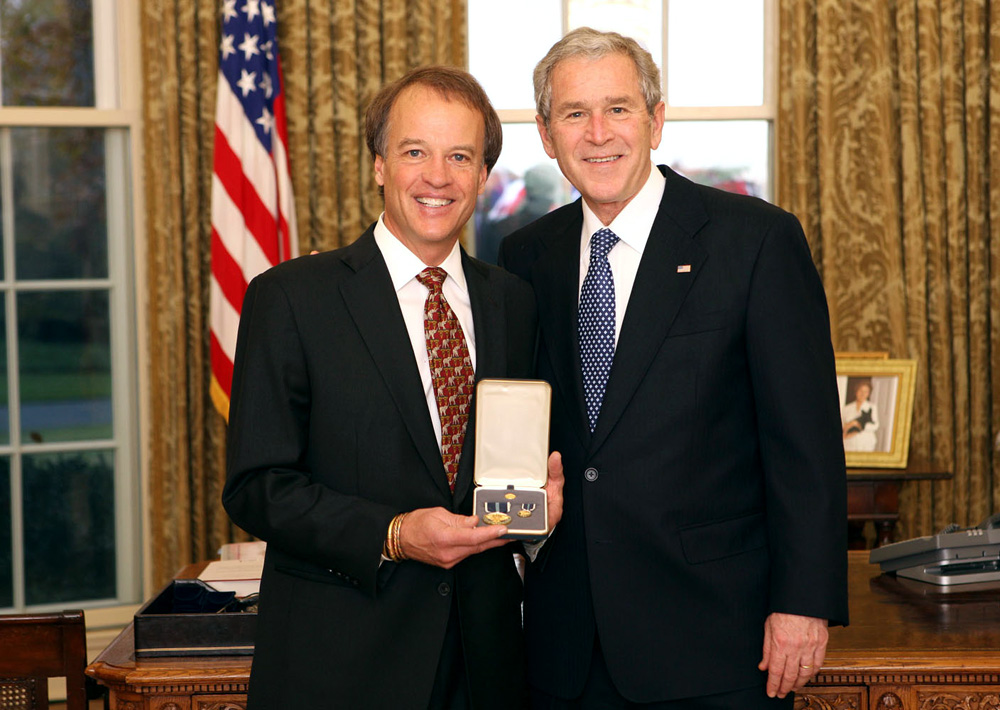
Brehm-Bush Oval Office Ceremony

He gave the keynote address at the 2008 National Prayer Breakfast before an audience including the U.S. President, First Lady, foreign heads of state, most members of Congress, and the Washington diplomatic community. Brehm was the first person from the business community to ever be asked by Congress to address this annual gathering in Washington DC. Brehm advocates for poor people in Africa at the White House, USAID and prayer breakfasts across the United States.

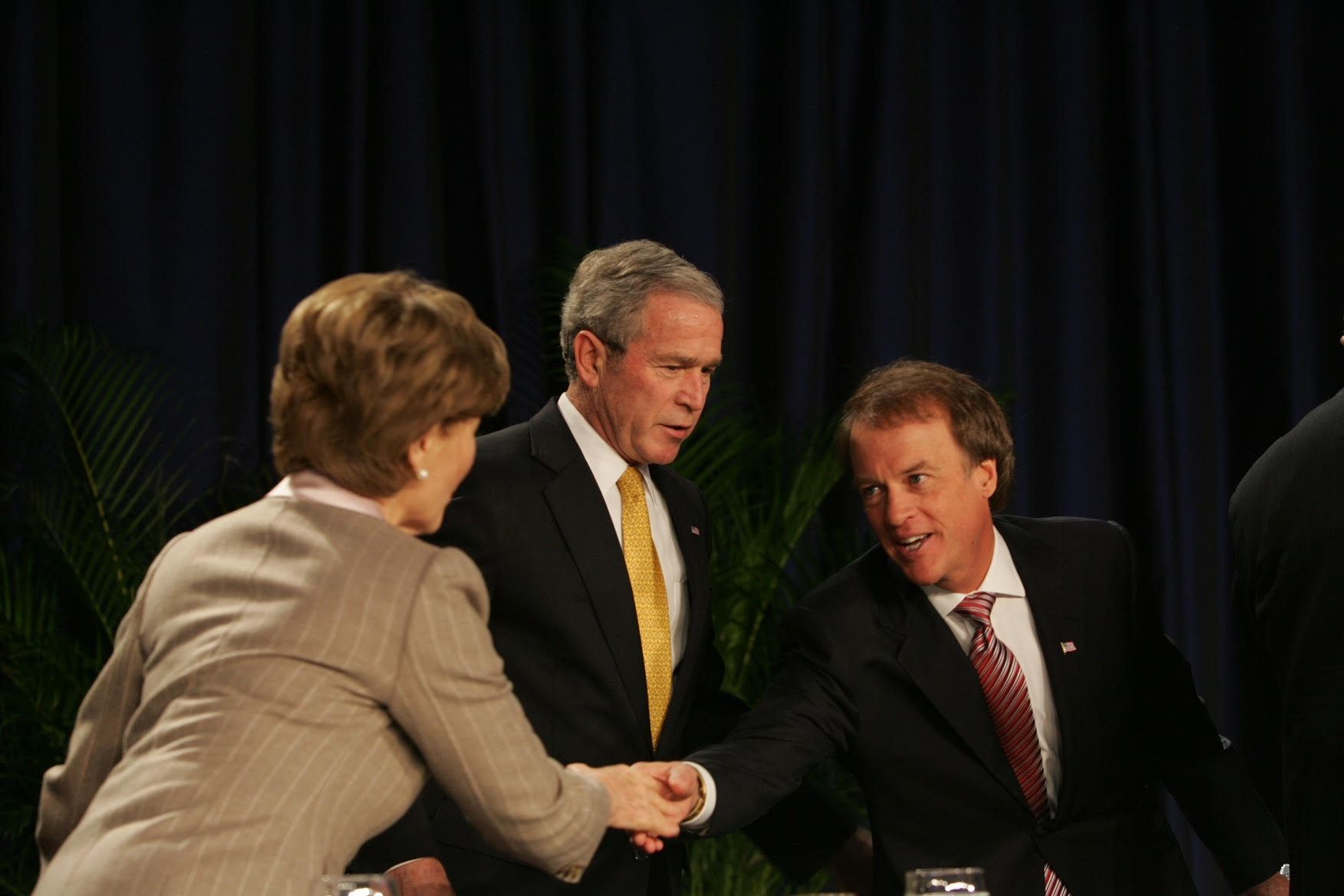
Ward Brehm greets President Bush and the First Lady at the 2008 National Prayer Breakfast in Washington, DC

As a member of the board of directors for Alight, which works with refugee communities around the world, Brehm founded Asili, an enterprise platform to bring clean water and basic medical care to the extreme poor. At Alight, he also founded and helped fund The Color Movement in collaboration with the Catholic Sisters of El Salvador, who offer an alternative identity to a life of violence and desperation with one that thrives on goodness, peace, and unity.

In 2018, he was appointed to the Advisory Board of the United States Agency for International Development (USAID) in Washington DC. He served in that capacity during both the Trump and Biden Administrations.

On March 3, 2025, in an emergency meeting of the USADF board of directors, Brehm was named USADF president. This happened after US President Donald Trump issued an executive order declaring that the "non-statutory components or functions" of USADF and three other agencies were to "be eliminated to the maximum extent consistent with applicable law and USADF subsequently temporarily stopped disbursing funds and submitted a report describing its mission and needed resources in accordance with the order. On February 24, Democratic members of the US Senate Committee on Foreign Relations had written to Trump objecting to any attempt to reduce, reorganize, or eliminate USADF. On February 28, the Trump administration attempted to name Pete Marocco to run USADF.

On March 5, 2025, Marocco and five US DOGE Service Temporary Organization (USDSTO) staffers were turned away from the USADF offices by foundation security staff. Brehm, who was not present, wrote to a USDSTO staffer that he had instructed his staff not to allow such meetings without him and that he looked forward to working with Marocco should he be nominated to the USADF board and confirmed by the Senate.

On the morning of March 6, Marocco and USDSTO staffers returned to the USADF offices accompanied by five individuals reportedly from the US Marshals Service, entered the facility and reportedly changed the locks. In a statement to the Washington Post, USADF declared it would "follow the law with the expectation that our staff will be treated with dignity and respect.” NBC News questioned whether the armed individuals who accompanied Marocco and the USDSTO staffers were in fact US Marshals. The response from the US Department of Justice was, "We are not making a statement at this time. We do request that you please verify with your sources that your reporting would be accurate."

Later that day, Brehm filed suit against Trump, USDSTO, Marocco and the heads of the White House Presidential Personnel Office and the US General Services Administration seeking a temporary restraining order (TRO) barring them from entering the foundation offices or removing him as chair and declaring attempts to do so beyond their legal authority. US District Judge Richard J. Leon issued an administrative stay the same day ordering that Brehm not be removed from his position and Marocco or any other person not be appointed in his place pending a hearing on March 11. While Leon denied the motion for a TRO stating that it did not meet the threshold for showing immediate and irreparable harm, he required USDSTO staffers to be available for testimony under oath as to the actions taken to maintain USADF's "minimum presence and function required by law." He also noted that the legal authorities the government cited in its response to the motion ignored Congressional amendments and U.S. Supreme Court precedent. Both sides were ordered to confer and state their positions on further action by March 12. On June 10, 2025, Leon ruled that Brehm lacked standing to challenge Marocco's appointment as the foundation's president as Brehm had been legally removed from his position beforehand.

He is the author of four books: Life Through A Different Lens, White Man Walking, Bigger than Me and a collection of personal poems, "Whispers in the Stillness."

== Personal life ==
Once retired from business, Ward Brehm engaged full time in the non-profit world. Earlier in his career he was the founder and chairman of The Brehm Group, Inc., a Twin Cities insurance consulting firm. He and his wife, Kris, live in Minneapolis, Minnesota. They have three grown children: Andy, Mike and Sarah.
