= Jean Hundertmark =

American politician

Jean Hundertmark (born February 25, 1954) is a former Republican member of the Wisconsin State Assembly representing the 40th district, where she served four terms as State Representative. Hundertmark served as Assistant Majority Leader in the Wisconsin State Assembly from 2003 to 2004.

In 2006, Hundertmark decided against seeking reelection, and instead ran unsuccessfully for Lieutenant Governor as the running mate of Mark Green. Hundertmark then served as chair of the 8th Congressional District Republican Party for two years.

Hundertmark and her family are residents of Clintonville, Wisconsin. They own an A&W Family Restaurant franchise. Hundertmark is married to Bruce Hundertmark. They are the parents of two daughters.

Party political offices
Preceded by Margaret Farrow	Republican nominee for Lieutenant Governor of Wisconsin; 2006	Succeeded by Rebecca Kleefisch
