= John Barsa =

American government official

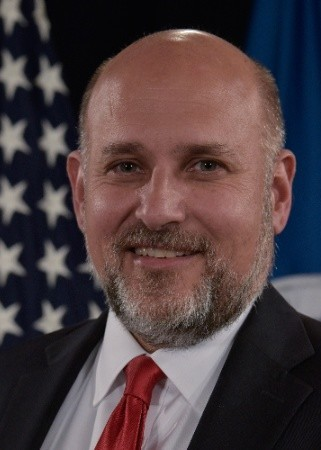

Deputy Administrator of the United States Agency for International Development
- Acting
- In office November 7, 2020 – January 20, 2021
- President: Donald Trump
- Preceded by: Bonnie Glick
- Succeeded by: Paloma Adams-Allen

Administrator of the United States Agency for International Development
- Acting
- In office April 13, 2020 – January 20, 2021 (Note: The first Trump administration redesignated Barsa as acting deputy administrator of USAID to circumvent the Federal Vacancies Reform Act of 1998 on November 7, 2020, but he remained the senior officer performing the duties of the administrator.)
- President: Donald Trump
- Preceded by: Mark Green
- Succeeded by: Gloria Steele (acting)

Personal details
- Born: Miami, Florida, U.S.
- Party: Republican
- Spouse: Lisa Piraneo
- Children: 2
- Education: University of Florida (attended); Florida International University (BA); George Washington University (attended)

John Barsa is an American businessman and consultant who formerly served as the United States Agency for International Development Acting Administrator in 2020. The White House requested that he assume the position of USAID Acting Deputy Administrator on November 7, 2020, which effectively circumvented the Federal Vacancies Reform Act of 1998 and would have required that he step down and leave the administrator's post vacant.

== Early life and education ==
The son of a Cuban refugee, Barsa was born and raised in Miami, Florida. He earned a Bachelor of Arts in international affairs from Florida International University and later received an executive education certificate from the Syracuse University National Security Management Fellows Program at the Maxwell School of Citizenship and Public Affairs.

== Military service ==
Barsa began his career in public service in the United States Army Reserve. He became an enlisted soldier in the 3rd Battalion of the 11th Special Forces Group, and later the 450th Civil Affairs Battalion.

== Legislative branch ==
Barsa served in the United States House of Representatives on U.S. Representative Lincoln Díaz-Balart's staff in the 1990s. During this period, he assisted Rep. Diaz-Balart with the passage of legislation such as the Nicaraguan Adjustment and Central American Relief Act and the Helms-Burton Act. In 2011, as a Republican candidate he campaigned for the Virginia House of Delegates, but lost to incumbent Democrat Scott Surovell.

== George W. Bush Administration ==
During the George W. Bush Administration, Barsa worked at NASA as a Special Assistant for Legislative Affairs. Once the Department of Homeland Security was established in 2002, Barsa was asked to create and lead the DHS Office of Public Liaison.

== Donald J. Trump Administration ==
In 2017, Barsa became a member of Donald Trump's presidential transition team. He went on to serve within the Trump administration at DHS as an assistant to then DHS Director John F. Kelly and was subsequently asked to assume the Acting Assistant Secretary post in charge of the DHS Office of Partnership and Engagement. In 2019, Trump nominated Barsa to serve as the United States Agency for International Development assistant administrator in the Bureau for Latin America and the Caribbean. He was confirmed unanimously by the U.S. Senate. In this position Barsa strengthened USAID’s democracy efforts in Cuba, Venezuela, and Nicaragua and secured a formal memorandum of understanding on behalf of DHS Customs and Border Protection for information sharing intended to enhance USAID data driven decision making regarding development and the root causes of immigration from Central America.

Barsa was asked by the White House to become USAID Acting Administrator in 2020 after the resignation of Mark Andrew Green. He led the agency through the onset of the coronavirus pandemic and was the first US senior official to travel to Beirut, Lebanon to offer U.S. support after the devastating explosion in August 2020. Under the Federal Vacancies Reform Act of 1998, Barsa was required to step down after 210 days in office unless he was officially nominated for the position and confirmed by the U.S. Senate. He was not nominated for the role. Instead, on November 6, 2020, after losing the election, President Trump fired Deputy Administrator Bonnie Glick in order to allow Barsa to assume the position in an acting capacity.

== Personal life ==
Barsa lives in Virginia and has two adult daughters.

Political offices
Preceded by Mark Green	Administrator of the United States Agency for International Development; Acting; 2020–2021	Succeeded by Gloria Steele; Acting
