= Bonnie Glick =

American diplomat and businesswoman

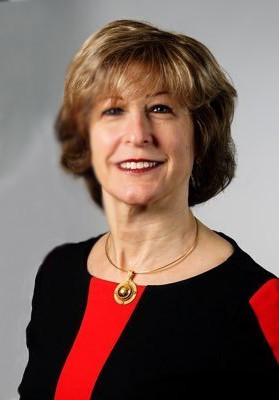

Deputy Administrator of the United States Agency for International Development
- In office January 2019 – November 6, 2020
- President: Donald Trump
- Preceded by: David H. Moore (acting)
- Succeeded by: John Barsa (acting)

Personal details
- Party: Republican
- Children: 2
- Relatives: Caroline Glick
- Education: Cornell University (BA); Columbia University (MA); University of Maryland (MBA)

Bonnie Glick is an American diplomat and businesswoman who served as the Deputy Administrator of the United States Agency for International Development from 2019 to 2020. Nominated for the post by President Donald Trump in April 2018, she was confirmed by the United States Senate by unanimous consent in January 2019.

== Early life and education ==
Glick grew up in Chicago where she attended the Akiba Schechter Jewish Day School and Kenwood Academy. Glick graduated from Cornell University with a degree in Government and International Relations, where she was a member of Alpha Epsilon Phi sorority. She graduated from Columbia University with a master's degree in International Affairs. She earned a Master's in Business Administration from the Robert H. Smith School of Business at the University of Maryland.

== Career ==
Glick worked for 12 years as a Foreign Service Officer at the United States Department of State. She later worked for IBM as a global account executive, where she co-authored three patents as part of IBM Research. Glick served as the Deputy Secretary of the Maryland Department of Aging from 2017 until 2019 under Governor Larry Hogan.

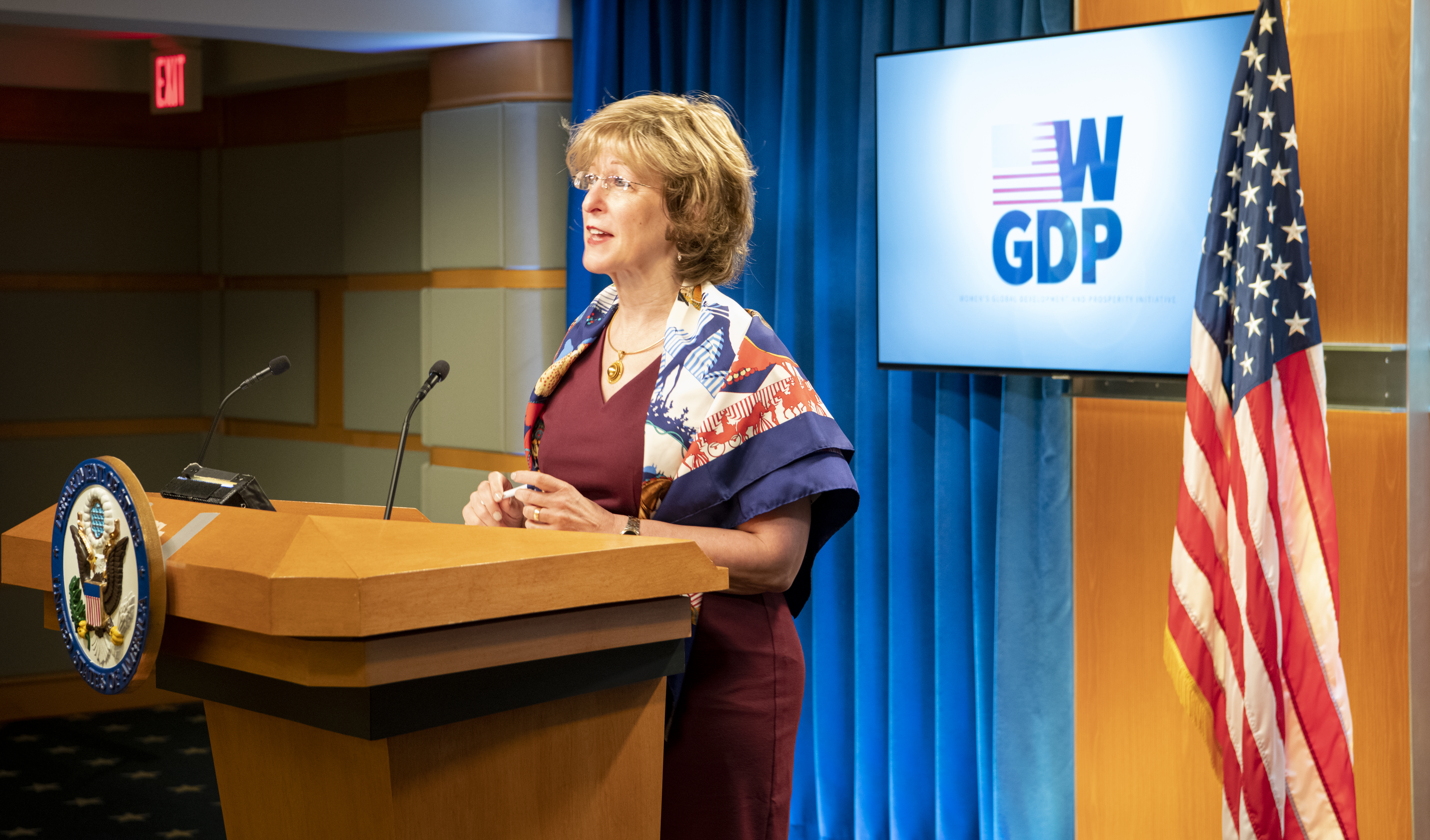
Glick delivers remarks at the Women's Global Development and Prosperity initiative virtual event on August 11, 2020, at the U.S. Department of State in Washington, D.C.

In her role as deputy administrator of USAID, Glick served as the chief operating officer of the agency. Among the issues she championed were digital transformation, the significance of 5G as a development priority in emerging markets, private sector engagement, democracy and governance, global vaccine distribution, and food security. She was the Executive Sponsor of USAID's COVID-19 Task Force that addressed both the safety and security of the global workforce and the international response to the outbreak. She led the Administrator's Action Alliance for Preventing Sexual Misconduct, the Executive Diversity Council, the Agency's Enterprise Risk Management Council, the Partner Vetting Council, and the Management Operations Council. As USAID's Chief Operating Officer, she represented the Agency on the President's Management Council.

Glick was due to become USAID's acting administrator on November 7, 2020, when Acting Administrator John Barsa would have reached the maximum time period allowed to serve in that position without Senate confirmation under the Federal Vacancies Reform Act of 1998. Hours before that limit was reached, Glick received a note from the White House, telling her that she needed to resign by 5 p.m. or Trump would fire her without cause. Glick refused to resign and was notified that her appointment had been terminated. This enabled Trump to name Barsa as acting deputy administrator, effectively keeping him at the helm of the agency.

After leaving the Trump Administration, Glick joined the Center for Strategic and International Studies as a Senior Advisor and became a Fellow in the Harvard University Institute of Politics. In September 2021 she became the Director of the Krach Institute for Tech Diplomacy at Purdue. She is a Senior Fellow at the Foundation for Defense of Democracies in Washington, DC.

== Personal life ==
Glick speaks seven languages including English, Spanish, Portuguese, Hebrew, Amharic, French, and Russian. Glick is the sister of Israeli conservative journalist and advisor to Prime Minister Benjamin Netanyahu, Caroline Glick.

Glick has written opinion pieces for the Washington Jewish Week, Newsweek, Deseret News and technology publications. Glick served on the Maryland-Israel Sister State Committee. She was appointed by Maryland governor Larry Hogan to serve on the board of trustees of Saint Mary's College of Maryland. She has served in leadership positions on a number of non-profit and corporate boards and serves as vice chair of Folkson Farms.

== See also ==
- Friendshoring
