= Inter-American Foundation =

U.S. government agency

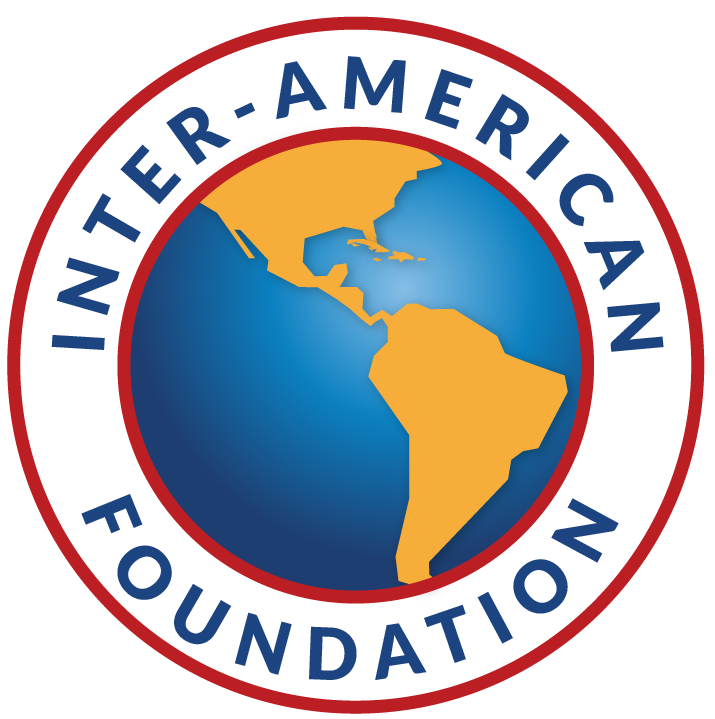
- Inter-American Foundation Seal
- Abbreviation: IAF
- Formation: 1969
- Type: Foreign assistance agency
- Headquarters: Washington, DC, United States
- President & CEO: Sara Aviel
- Budget: $29 million (FY 2026)
- Website: iaf.gov

The Inter-American Foundation, or IAF, is an independent agency of the United States government that funds community-led development in Latin America and the Caribbean. It was created through the Foreign Assistance Act of 1969 as an alternative to traditional foreign assistance that operates government-to-government on a much larger scale. The IAF receives its funds through annual appropriations by Congress. Until 2019, the agency also received annual reflows from the Social Progress Trust Fund administered by the Inter-American Development Bank consisting of repayments on U.S. government loans extended under the Alliance for Progress to various Latin American and Caribbean governments. Since beginning operations in 1972, the IAF has awarded more than 5,800 grants worth more than $957 million.

In February 2025 President Donald Trump signed an executive order stating that "the non-statutory components and functions" of a handful of governmental entities, including the IAF, "shall be eliminated to the maximum extent consistent with applicable law".

== History ==
With his articles in the magazine Foreign Affairs and his book The Engines of Change, Harvard professor George C. Lodge significantly influenced the intellectual climate that led to the passage of the IAF's enabling legislation. Lodge wrote that poverty was the greatest threat to U.S. interests in the Americas. In "U.S. Aid to Latin America: Funding Radical Change", which appeared in Foreign Affairs in July 1969, he urged creation of an American Foundation which would revolutionize the social and political structures in Latin America. Lodge was appointed to the IAF's founding board of directors in 1971.

Representative Dante B. Fascell (D-Fla.) was the architect of the legislation to establish the Inter-American Social Development Institute (ISDI), which would later be renamed the Inter-American Foundation. The ISDI represented a redesigned form of foreign aid to channel development assistance directly to grassroots and civil society groups in developing countries. Congress designed the agency with a unique characteristic: gift authority, the ability to accept and channel contributions to its grantees: “[The IAF] may accept money, funds, property, and services of every kind by gift, device, bequest, grant, or otherwise, and make advances, grants, and loans to any individual, corporation, or other body of persons, whether within or without the United States of America, or to any government or governmental agency, domestic or foreign, when deemed advisable by the Foundation in furtherance of its purposes."

According to the OECD, The United States’ total official development assistance (ODA) (USD 55.3 billion, preliminary data) increased in 2022, mainly due to support to Ukraine, as well as increased costs for in-donor refugees from Afghanistan. ODA represented 0.22% of gross national income (GNI).

Congress enacted a bill with bipartisan support on December 30, 1969, that established ISDI as Part IV of the Foreign Assistance Act. On September 21, 1970, the Senate confirmed the candidates for the board of the agency: Augustin Hart, Jr., George C. Lodge, Charles A. Meyer, John Richardson, Jr., and John A. Hannah. Another two candidates were added on October 17, 1970: Governor Luís A. Ferré and Charles W. Robinson. The board's first act was to commission a study of development assistance headed by Irving Tragen to develop the agency's model. On March 16, 1971, William M. Dyal was sworn in as the agency's first Executive Director, and the agency officially began operating. The agency had received the $50 million designated in its initial authorization from other foreign assistance agencies by June 28, 1971.

In his Second Annual Report to the Congress on United States Foreign Policy on February 25, 1971, President Nixon set forth the administration's vision of the agency as follows:

“The need is for innovative ideas and programs, particularly from non-governmental sources, which are more directly responsive to social problems as perceived by the people of the region. To meet this need, we created in 1970 the Inter-American Social Development Institute. Directed by a board with a majority from the private sector, the new Institute will provide funds primarily to non-governmental organizations in the U.S. and Latin America--such as universities, credit unions, and foundations--to help them share their expertise.”

On August 3, 1971, the House Foreign Affairs Committee passed a legislative amendment changing the name of the agency from the Inter-American Social Development Institute to the Inter-American Foundation. In 1973, the IAF partnered with the Inter-American Development Bank to use up to $10 million annually in regional currencies from the U.S. government-funded Special Progress Trust Fund, an arrangement that was periodically renewed through 2019.

The IAF has had a low profile because of its comparatively small budget. However, during the mid-1980s, the IAF received some national attention when it became a political battleground for President Ronald Reagan and Congressional Democrats.

=== Executive Order issued on February 19, 2025 ===
On February 19, 2025, President Donald Trump issued an executive order intended to wind down the foundation and several other government entities. It gave the head of each entity 14 days to submit a report to the Office of Management and Budget to confirm compliance and state whether their functions are statutorily required and to what extent. It asked the director of OMB or any other agency charged with reviewing grant requests for said entities to reject funding requests that violate the order.

On February 28, the Trump administration notified the IAF board via email that it was firing IAF president and CEO Sara Aviel and terminating all board members while naming Pete Marocco as IAF president and sole board member. Though the IAF board rejected this attempt and instructed Aviel to deny access to IAF systems and files and void the actions of anyone outside the organization, by the evening of March 3 most IAF employees had been placed on paid administrative leave after Marocco and staffers from the U.S. DOGE Service Temporary Organization (USDSTO) met with them. USDSTO staffers then remained in the office, requesting access to IAF databases and grantee lists, after which all IAF contracts and grants were reportedly cancelled. The American Federation of Government Employees, representing IAF employees, was considering legal options in response to the irregular actions.

On March 17, Aviel sued over her firing. On April 4, a judge granted a preliminary injunction unwinding the actions of Peter Marocco and reinstating Aviel as President & CEO of the IAF, noting that Marocco's actions were unlawful because he was without authorization to act as representative of the IAF. On June 5, the DC Circuit Court of Appeals refused to grant a stay of the injunction, noting that it was "unlikely that either the President or Marocco permissibly removed Aviel." The District Court granted a final judgement in Aviel's favor on August 14, 2025.

== Grant program ==
The IAF funds initiatives received in response to its call for proposals from grassroots groups and the organizations that support them in Latin America and the Caribbean. Projects are selected for funding on the basis of merit rather than by sector. Successful applicants receive between US$25,000 and US$400,000. The average length of grant is approximately four years. IAF grantees are required to contribute in cash or in kind resources toward the success of their projects and are encouraged to mobilize resources to continue their impact after their IAF funding has ended. The IAF does not accept proposals presented or directed by individuals, government entities, for-profit organizations, or organizations outside the country in which the project is located. The IAF also does not fund proposals for purely religious activities, research activities exclusively, only construction and equipment, charity or welfare projects of any kind, or projects associated with political parties or partisan movements.

The IAF looks for the following in a project it funds:

1. Inclusivity: Projects should involve many community voices in developing, carrying out, and evaluating the project, including those who will benefit from the project; and engage partners in local government, the business community, and other civil society organizations.
2. Use of community resources: Projects should include counterpart resources like money, land, supplies, infrastructure, labor, and office, storage, and meeting space; and identify a path to become sustainable after the IAF grant ends.
3. Focus on results: Projects should impact the community in a positive and measurable way, show potential for strengthening all participating organizations, and enhance participants’ capacity to govern themselves.

== Fellowship program ==
The IAF has periodically supported academic field research on grassroots development since 1974, providing fellowships to doctoral students, post-doctoral researchers, master's degree candidates and, between 1991 and 1995 a few outstanding Latin American and Caribbean grassroots leaders awarded the Dante B. Fascell Inter-American Fellowship to pursue independent study. As of April 30, 2024, the IAF is funding fellowships in partnership with the Social Science Research Council.

== Leadership ==
The Inter-American Foundation is governed by a bipartisan board of directors appointed by the president of the United States and confirmed by the U.S. Senate. Six members are drawn from the private sector and three from the federal government: employees of agencies of the United States concerned with inter-American affairs, the United States Executive Director of the Inter-American Development Bank, or the Alternate Executive Director of the Inter-American Development Bank. A president, appointed by the board, serves as the Inter-American Foundation's chief executive officer. The current President & CEO is Sara Aviel. Previous presidents have included Paloma Adams-Allen (2017–2021), Robert Kaplan (2010–2017), Larry Palmer (2005–2010), David Valenzuela (2000–2005), George Evans (1994–1999), William Perrin (1990–1994), Deborah Szekely (1984 to 1990), Peter Bell (1980–1983), and William Dyal (1971–1980).

=== Board of Directors ===
The board of directors is composed of nine members, appointed by the president of the United States with the consent of the United States Senate. Of these, six members are appointed from private life, and three members from among officers and employees of U.S. agencies concerned with inter-American affairs or either the U.S. Executive Director or Alternate Executive Director of the Inter-American Development Bank. All members shall be appointed on the basis of possessing an understanding of and sensitivity to community level development processes. No more than five members may be affiliated with the same political party. Members are appointed to terms of six years, but they may continue to serve on the board until a successor is confirmed.

The President designates one member to serve as chairperson and one member to serve as vice chairperson. A majority of the members of the board constitutes a quorum.

=== Current board members ===
The current board members as of August 7, 2026:

Position	Name	Group	Party	Assumed office	Term expiration
Chair	Vacant				
Vice chair	Vacant				
Member	Juan Segura	Private life	Republican	TBD	September 20, 2032
Member	Vacant				
Member	Vacant				
Member	Vacant				
Member	Vacant				
Member	Vacant				
Member	Vacant				

=== Nominations ===
President Trump has nominated the following to fill seats on the board. They await Senate confirmation.

Name	Group	Party	Term expires	Replacing
Russell Vought	Private life	Republican	September 20, 2030	J. Kelly Ryan
Kenneth Jackson	Government employee	Republican	September 20, 2030	Hector E. Morales

== Publications ==
Detailed information on localized approaches to working with communities can be found in the IAF's annual report.

== See also ==
- Title 22 of the Code of Federal Regulations
