= Anupama Rajaraman =

Anupama Rajaraman is a senior official in the United States Agency for International Development (USAID), holding the position of Mission Director in Colombia. She is currently USAID's Mission Director in Guatemala.

Rajaraman is a member of the Senior Foreign Service, where she has played a role in various USAID missions across the globe for two decades.

== Early career and education ==
Anupama Rajaraman began her career with USAID as an Urban Management Fellow in 2001, working with the Regional Urban Development Office in South Africa.

She joined USAID as an Urban Management Fellow assigned to USAID's Regional Urban Development Office in South Africa in 2001, and later as a Presidential Management Fellow (Democracy & Governance Officer) in the year 2003.

Raised on Galveston Island, Texas, she earned her Bachelor of Arts in government from the University of Texas at Austin and holds a Master of Public Administration (MPA) from the Maxwell School at Syracuse University.

== Biography ==
Rajaraman's tenure with USAID has included leadership roles in multiple countries. As the Mission Director in Colombia, she oversees a team of 145 professionals. Her leadership was instrumental in initiatives such as the "Restoring Our Future" program, which seeks to consolidate peace and reconciliation efforts in Colombia.

Prior to her current role, Rajaraman served as Mission Director in Guatemala. There, she focused on strengthening partnerships with Indigenous peoples and promoting locally led development. Her efforts were critical to advancing USAID's goals of inclusivity and self-reliance.

Rajaraman has also participated in USAID's broader strategies, including her work as the USAID Forward Coordinator and lead on the Journey to Self-Reliance initiative. She spearheaded efforts to integrate science, technology, innovation, and private sector partnerships into USAID's operations, particularly during her tenure with the U.S. Global Development Lab.

Rajaraman's experience extends to India, where she and her team redefined USAID's development model to better leverage local entrepreneurship and innovation. She has also previously served in Colombia between 2007 and 2011, managing development projects across South Asia, Latin America, and Southern Africa.

== Recent initiatives ==
In recent years, Rajaraman has been involved in high-level international cooperation efforts between the United States and Colombia. Notably, she played a key role in the signing of an international cooperation agreement between the Colombian Ministry of Justice and USAID, aimed at implementing the Holistic Drug Strategy formulated by the White House. This agreement marks a significant step in the collaboration between the two governments in combating drug trafficking and supporting related social programs.
