= Pastime (disambiguation) =

A pastime is a recreational activity or hobby.

Pastime may also refer to:

== Places ==
- Pastime Park, Plain City, Ohio
- The Pastime Theater, Winfield, Alabama
- Pastime Athletic Club, Portland, Oregon. Mentioned for numerous athletes, e.g., Mysterious Billy Smith
- Pastime Stables at the Hollywood Plantation, Thomasville, Georgia
- Pastime Bar, Fort Lauderdale, Florida, visited by Jim Nolan, a biker involved in the Hells Angels murders

== Art ==
- "Pastime" (1984), a painting by Gerald Garston, American painter and printmaker
- The Pastime (1881), an exhibit by Pietro Lazzarini, Italian sculptor

== Film ==
- Pastime (1990), American sports drama

== Music and dance ==
=== Albums ===
- Pastime (2004), by Roger "Hurricane" Wilson, American electric blues guitarist, singer and songwriter

=== Songs ===
- "Pastime" (1952), by Lennie Tristano, American jazz pianist, composer, arranger, and teacher of jazz improvisation
- "Pastime" (1985), by Tangerine Dream from the soundtrack of Heartbreakers
- "Pastime" (1995), from Slow Note from a Sinking Ship by Portastatic, American indie rock
- Pastime (2006), song-cycle for baritone and orchestra by Richard Danielpour, American composer and academic
- "Pastime (Remix)" (2017), single by RileyPnP featuring Larry June
- Spanish: Pasatiempo, lit. 'Pastime' (2022), from Legendaddy by Daddy Yankee, Puerto Rican rapper, singer and songwriter

=== Dance ===
- Pastime (1963) by Lucinda Childs, American postmodern dancer and choreographer

== Literature ==
- Pastime (1991), novel by Robert B. Parker, American mystery writer
- French: Un Passe Temps, lit. 'A Pastime' (1979) novel by André Ruellan, French science fiction and horror writer
- Icelandic: Dægradvöl, lit. 'Pastime' (1923), autobiography by Benedikt Sveinbjarnarson Gröndal
- Breton: An tremen-buhez, lit. 'The Pastime' (1979), poetry collection by Pêr-Jakez Helias, Breton stage actor, journalist, author, and poet
- Pastime: The Lawn Tennis Journal (founded 1883), magazine edited by Nicholas Lane Jackson
- The Pastime (遊戲雜誌; Yóuxì zázhì), Chinese banned magazine
- Pastime, fictional character able to manipulate the flow of time, in New Men (Image Comics)

== Ships ==
- Dutch: Tijdverdrijf, lit. 'Pastime' (c. 1655), of the Dutch Northern Wars
- Pastime, American yacht shipwrecked in 1918
- Pastime, American steamboat of the Coquille River

== Brands ==
- Pastime, an American brand of wooden jigsaw puzzles made by Parker Brothers from 1908 to 1958
- "Pastime" (1907), first washing machine by Maytag

== Other uses ==
- America's Pastime, a moniker for baseball since the late 19th century
- Pastime, a racehorse which won the 2001 Sydney Stakes (alongside Strabane)

== See also ==
- Past Time (disambiguation)
- "Pastime Rag No. 3" (1916), rag by Artie Matthews, American songwriter, pianist, and ragtime composer
- German: Jungferlicher Zeitvertreiber, lit. 'Pastime for Virgins' (1686) poetry collection by Susanna Elizabeth Zeidler
- Pastime Software Company, former name of an American collections archiving software developer
- Pastime Stories (1894), a collection of short stories by Thomas Nelson Page
- Sport and Pastime (1947–1968), Indian weekly sports magazine
