= Pastime Puzzles =

American jigsaw puzzle brand

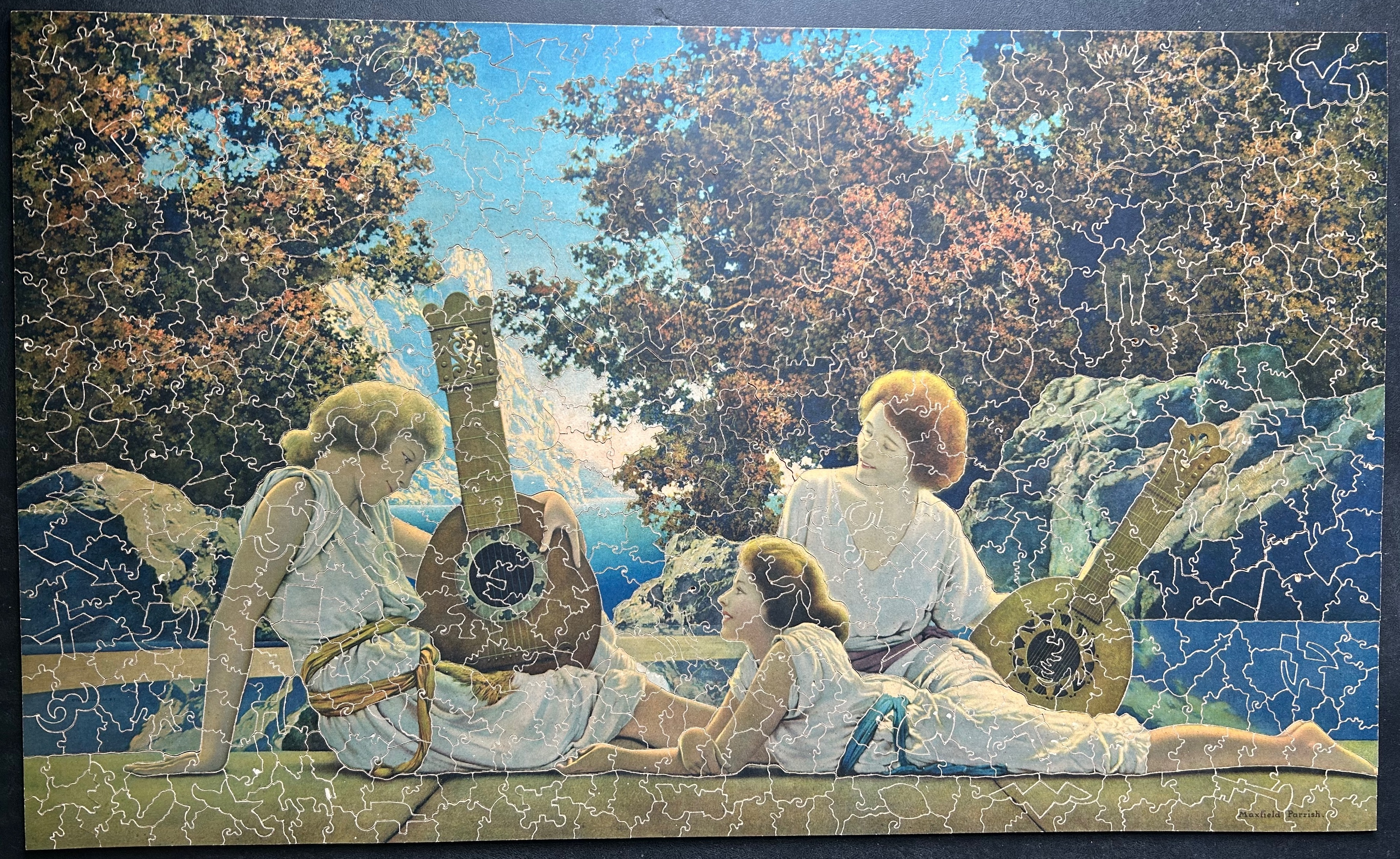
A 750 piece Pastime Puzzle called "The Lute Players" with art by Maxfield Parrish.

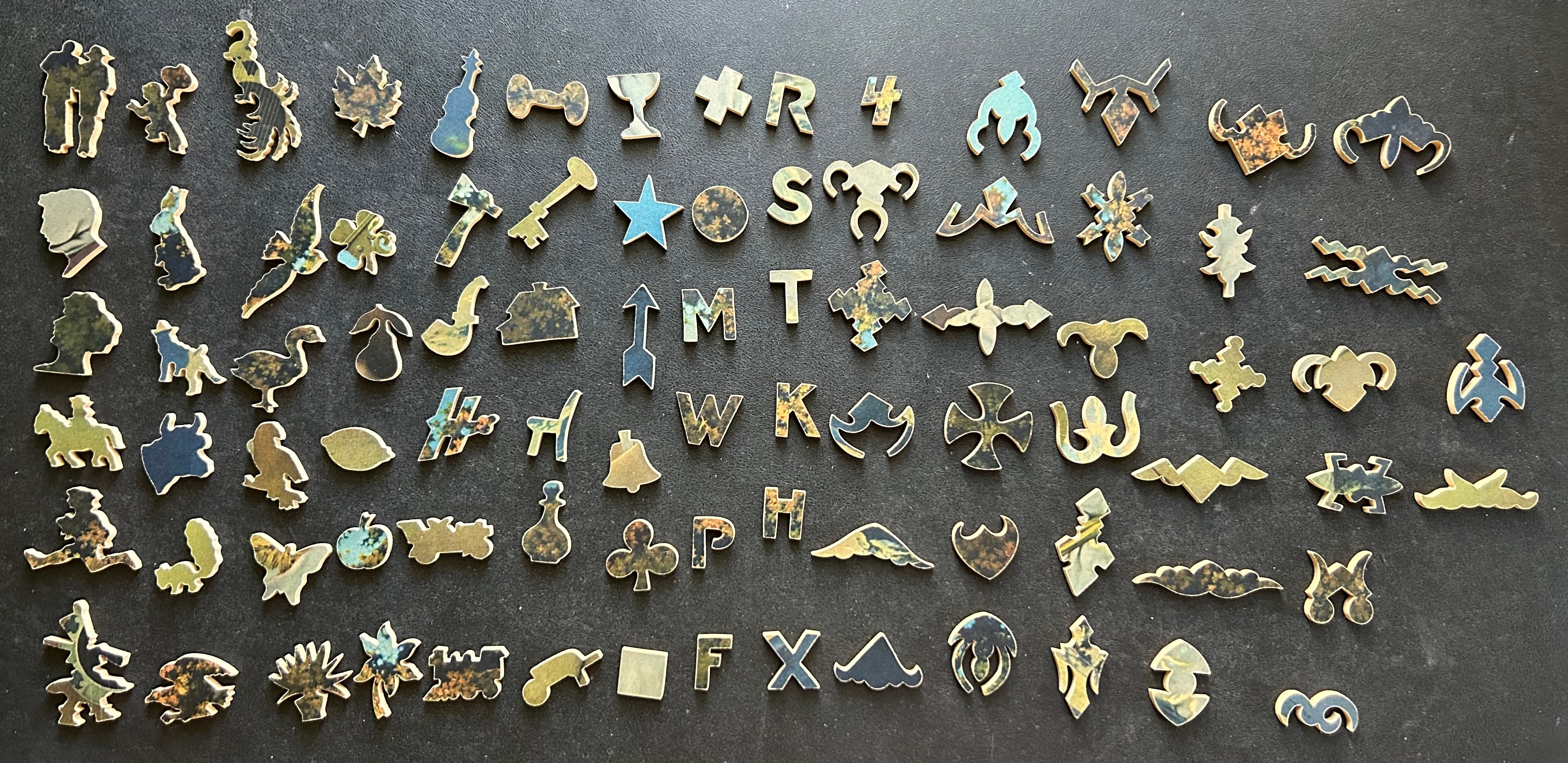
Figure pieces from the 750 piece Pastime Puzzle "The Lute Players." Note the mix of representational and geometric figure pieces.

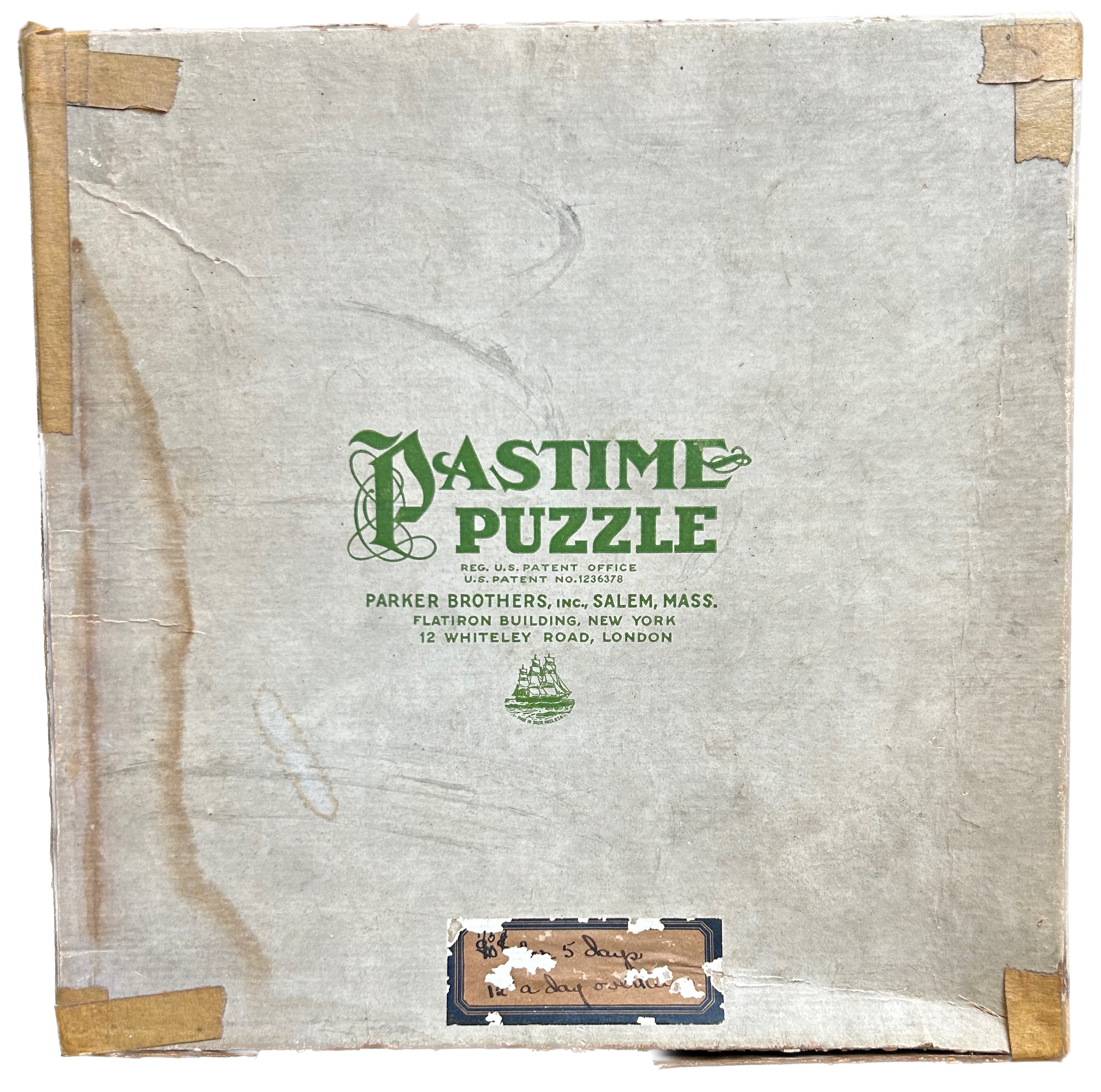
The top of the Pastime Puzzle box from the 750 piece puzzle "The Lute Players." There is also a damaged label that suggests this puzzle was previously part of a rental library.

The Pastime Picture Puzzle or Pastime Puzzles was an American brand of wooden jigsaw puzzles made by Parker Brothers from 1908 to 1958. Female employees made hand-cut wooden puzzles for adults using scroll saws. Distinctive features of Pastimes include extensive cutting along color lines, a mix of representational and geometric figure pieces (approximately 12 figure pieces out of 100 pieces), and interlocking pieces. The business was based out of Salem, Massachusetts, and at various times had sales offices in New York, Chicago, and London.

== History ==
The first advertisements for Pastime puzzles appeared in trade magazines in July 1908. This coincided with a large rise in popularity in jigsaw puzzles for adults in the United States that began in 1907 and lasted until around 1910. Puzzles were so popular at this time that in 1909 Parker Brothers shut down its production of games and only made puzzles, employing 300 workers in puzzle making and needing to rent an additional building to keep up with demand.

The first Pastimes were similar to other puzzles of the time: randomly cut with non-interlocking pieces. The first figure pieces representing items such as letters, animals, and symbols started to appear in 1909. Figure pieces (sometimes called "whimsies" or "figurals") are still found in modern hand-cut and laser-cut wooden puzzle brands, including Stave Puzzles, Par Puzzles, Liberty Puzzles, and Artifact Puzzles. By 1911, a distinctive Pastime style had emerged, with a mix of abstract geometric and representational figure pieces, interlocking pieces, and cuts along color lines. As the 1907-1910 puzzle craze faded, Parker Brothers downsized its Pastime workshop.

The second boom for Pastime Puzzles occurred during the Great Depression, when there was another puzzle craze in the United States. To take advantage of this demand, the Pastime department at Parker Brothers grew from around two dozen puzzle cutters in 1927 to more than 100 cutters in the early 1930s.

After World War II, rising labor costs and increased competition from cheaper cardboard puzzles caused the demand for wooden puzzles to drop. Parker Brothers reduced Pastime production, with only a half dozen cutters working through the 1950s. Parker Brothers discontinued the Pastime line in 1958.

Pastime customers were said to have included the household of the Russian emperor, residents of Buckingham Palace, and Teddy Roosevelt.

== Working conditions ==
Pastime cutters were paid by the piece, cutting around 1400 pieces a day. Pastime cutters had a lot of autonomy in their work, which can be seen in the diversity of cutting styles found in different puzzles; for example, some Pastime puzzles featured curl interlocks while others used heart-shaped earlets or other types of connectors.
