= Jigsaw puzzle accessories =

Items for assembling, storing and displaying jigsaw puzzles

Jigsaw puzzle accessories are the accessories used to assemble, store, and display jigsaw puzzles.

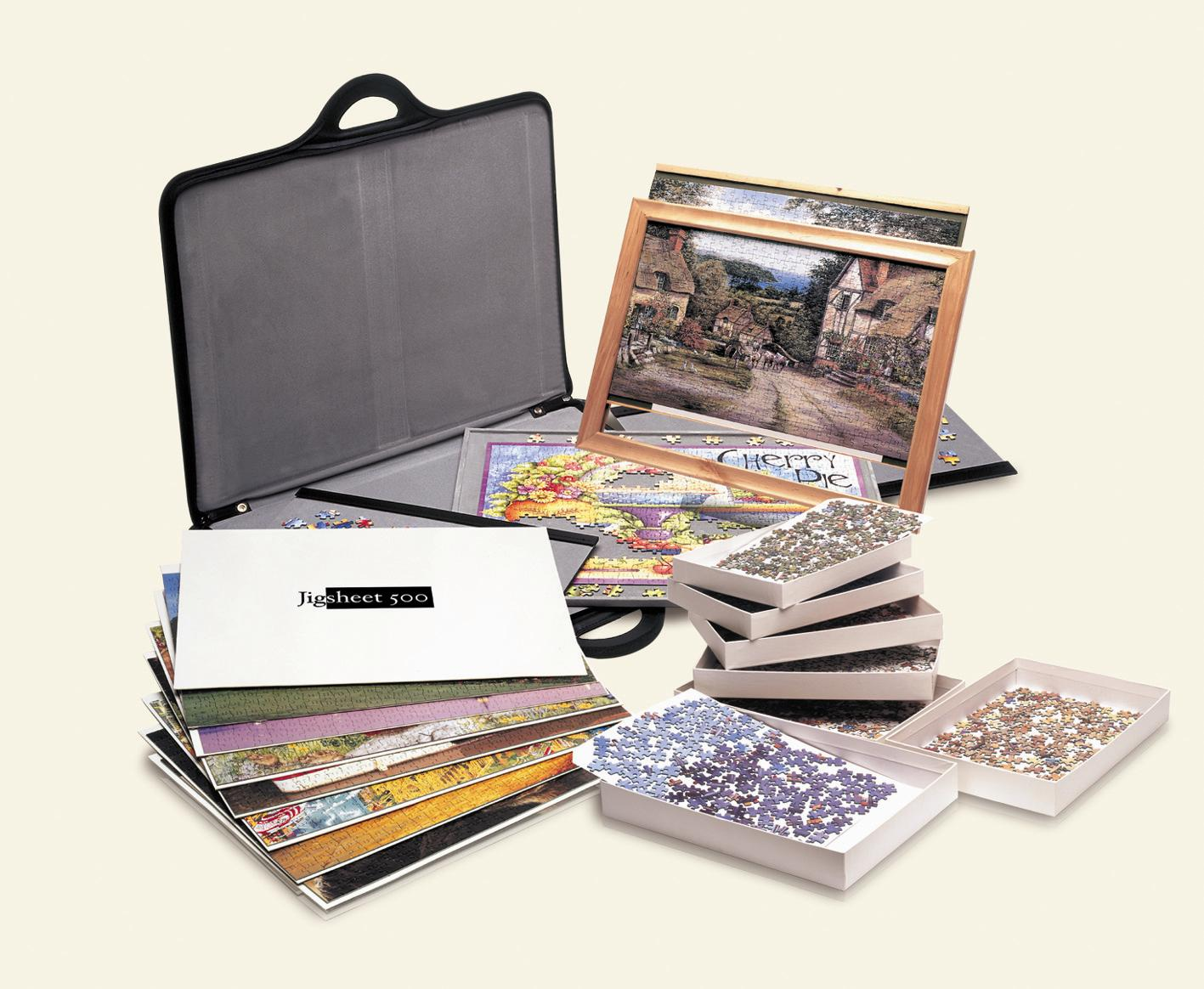
Jigsaw puzzle accessories for making, displaying and storing jigsaw puzzles

== History ==
Jigsaw puzzles were made commercially available in England by John Spilsbury around 1760. Jigsaws are popular throughout Europe, and in the American Great Depression jigsaw puzzles sold at the rate of 10 million per week.

The first references to any kind of jigsaw puzzle accessory can be found around 1900 when a "Frame" was first included in Dutch jigsaw puzzle boxes so that a completed puzzle could be permanently saved. The idea was not successful and was soon discontinued. The same happened to the mahogany and walnut "Puzzle Trays" that were advertised in Viking's Picture Puzzle Weekly in America during the 1930s.

In the late 1980s, Falcon Games in England applied for a trademark, and on 4th of August 1989 their self-explanatory Jigroll name was registered (UK Patent Office Reference 1318441). Although many companies have since copied the functionality of the Jigroll, none have been able to give their products the same name. Nowadays, the jigsaw puzzle parlance "Jigroll" has almost become a generic term for all jigsaw mats and rolls.

Jigsaw puzzle frames, in which a completed puzzle can be displayed, have never been very popular in either Europe or the US. However, in the case of Japan, the customary use of jigsaws is for wall decoration. From the time that jigsaws first became available in Japan, in the 1970s, jigsaw frames have been available to fit the jigsaw sizes of all the leading manufacturers.

== Modern jigsaw puzzle accessories ==
Illustrated below are the most widely used modern products. Most of the accessories come in a range of sizes to cater for jigsaw puzzles between 500 and 2,000 pieces with the 1,000-piece size being the most popular.

=== Stand-alone construction tray ===
Construction trays are the most basic of all jigsaw puzzle accessories and they come in many different materials. Sizes required for different piece counts are as follows:

- 500 pieces: 520 mm x 395 mm (20.4" x 15.5")
- 1000 pieces: Approximately 750 mm x 520 mm (29.5" x 20.4")
- 1500 pieces: Approximately 915 mm x 660 mm (36.0" x 26.0")
- 2000 pieces: Approximately 1016 mm x 711 mm (40" x 28")

The major problem with stand alone construction trays is that they cannot be packed away and stored with a part-assembled jigsaw. However, they can very easily be moved around from place to place in a home - the only functionality required by many people.

=== Roll-up mat ===
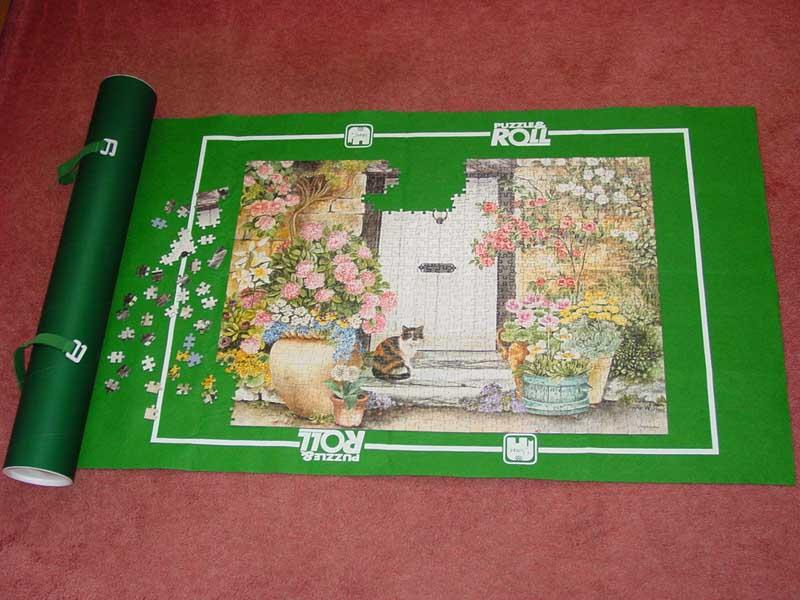
Jigroll, the first accessory to obtain a trademark

Launched in 1989, the Jigroll was the forerunner of modern jigsaw puzzle accessories. The jigsaw puzzle is constructed on a green cloth that has a coarse texture to which cardboard jigsaw pieces adhere. The non assembled pieces are also kept on the cloth. When the puzzle needs to be cleared away the entire cloth is rolled around a drum thus keeping both the assembled and non-assembled pieces trapped in position until the cloth is unrolled again.

=== Portfolio case ===
Portapuzzle obtained a registered trade mark and international patents for Manchester-based company Parker Hilton Ltd. approximately four years after Falcon Games purchased the patents for Jigroll, a product invented by Leslie Pratt. When using the Portapuzzle, a portfolio case opens out to reveal a PVC flock-backed lining. The puzzle is constructed on the centre section of the case and the unassembled pieces are kept either on the other side of the case or on "Panels" provided. When closed up, the flock-backed lining on either side of the case and the "velcro" fasteners exert enough pressure to keep the jigsaw pieces in place.

This invention is generally considered to be a safer way of keeping pieces in place but involves more material and assembly labour than a Jigroll, and is consequently more expensive.

=== Portfolio case with separate construction tray ===
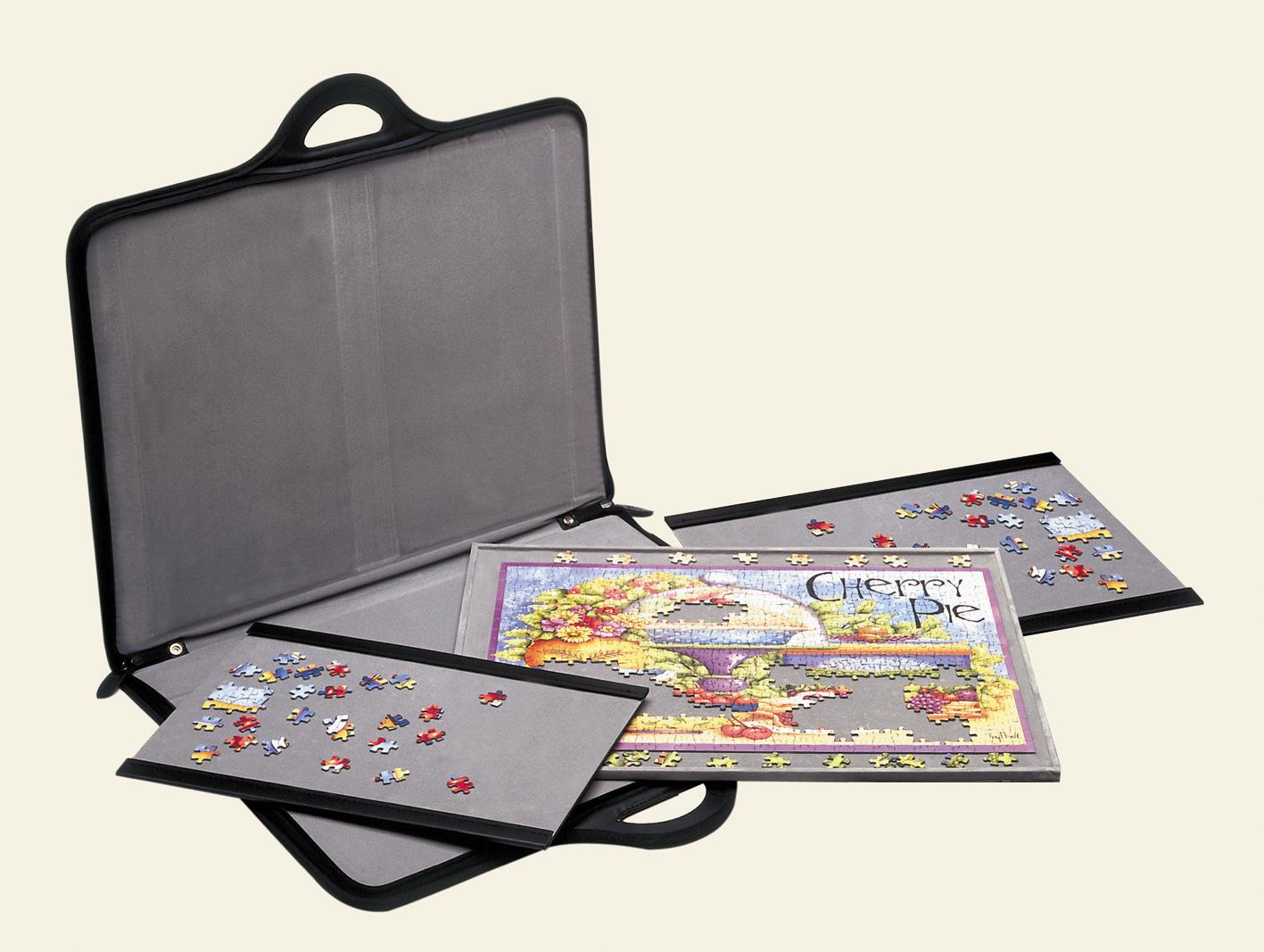
Jigsort puzzles are made on a separate "Construction Tray".

The outer carrying case holds a separate "Construction Tray" on which the jigsaw is made and "Sort Trays" on which the unassembled pieces are kept. The sort trays come complete with tightly fitting lids. To pack away the jigsaw the sort trays (with their lids in place) are fitted inside the construction tray and the whole is then zipped up inside the carrying case.

The separate construction tray is very light and can easily be moved around and an additional benefit is the raised edge around the outside of the tray that ensures pieces do not drop off and get lost. However, the extra component parts add to the retail price.

=== Nesting boxes for unassembled pieces ===
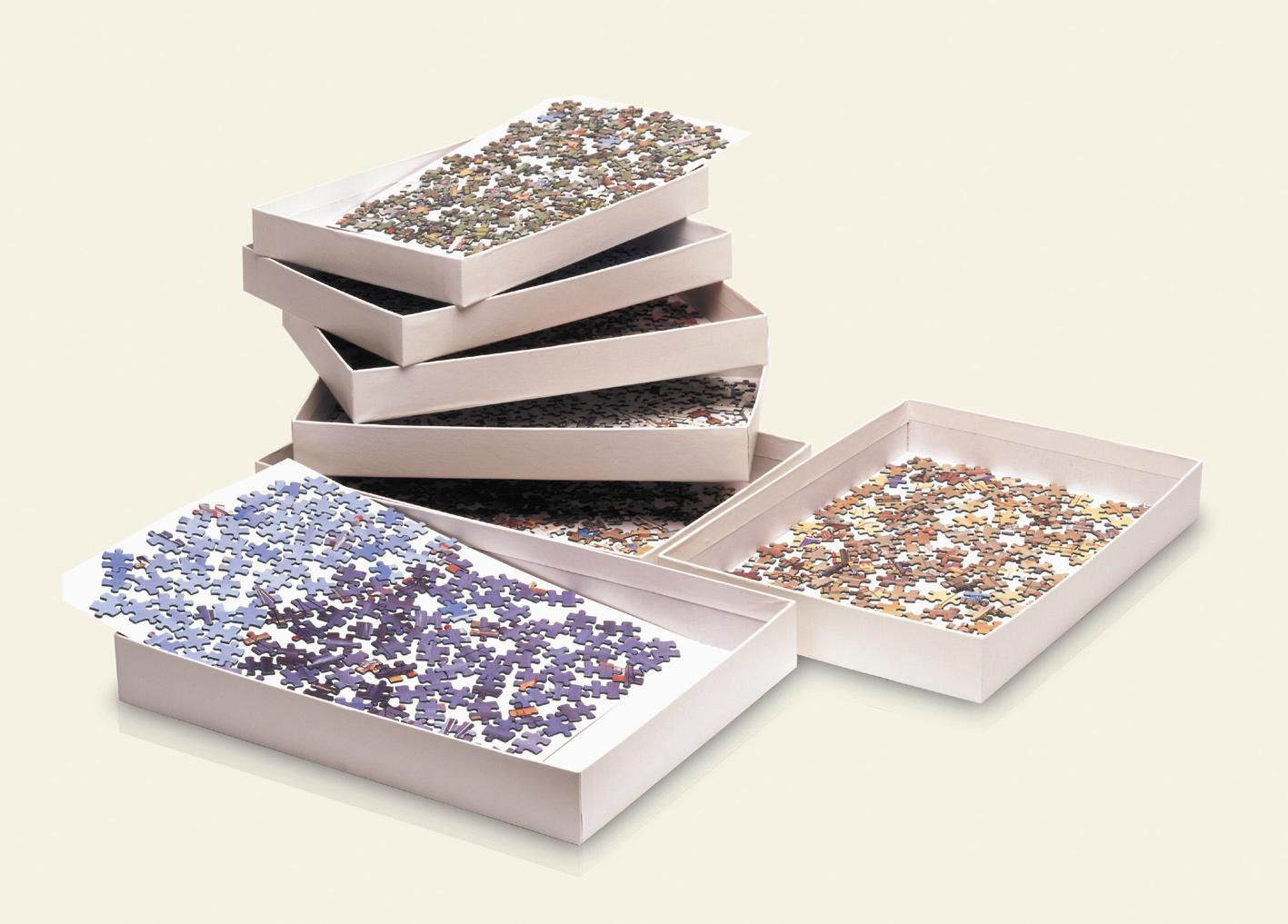
Jigsafe: Up to 1,000 jigsaw puzzle pieces are neatly displayed.

The loose pieces of a jigsaw take up approximately twice the space of a completed puzzle and these nesting boxes aim to solve the problem of how best to store 1,000 loose pieces in a small area. The boxes can be used for sorting different shapes or colours of piece. Each box has a removable insert so that sections of the puzzle can be constructed in the box and then easily moved to the developing jigsaw.

=== Jigsaw puzzle frames ===
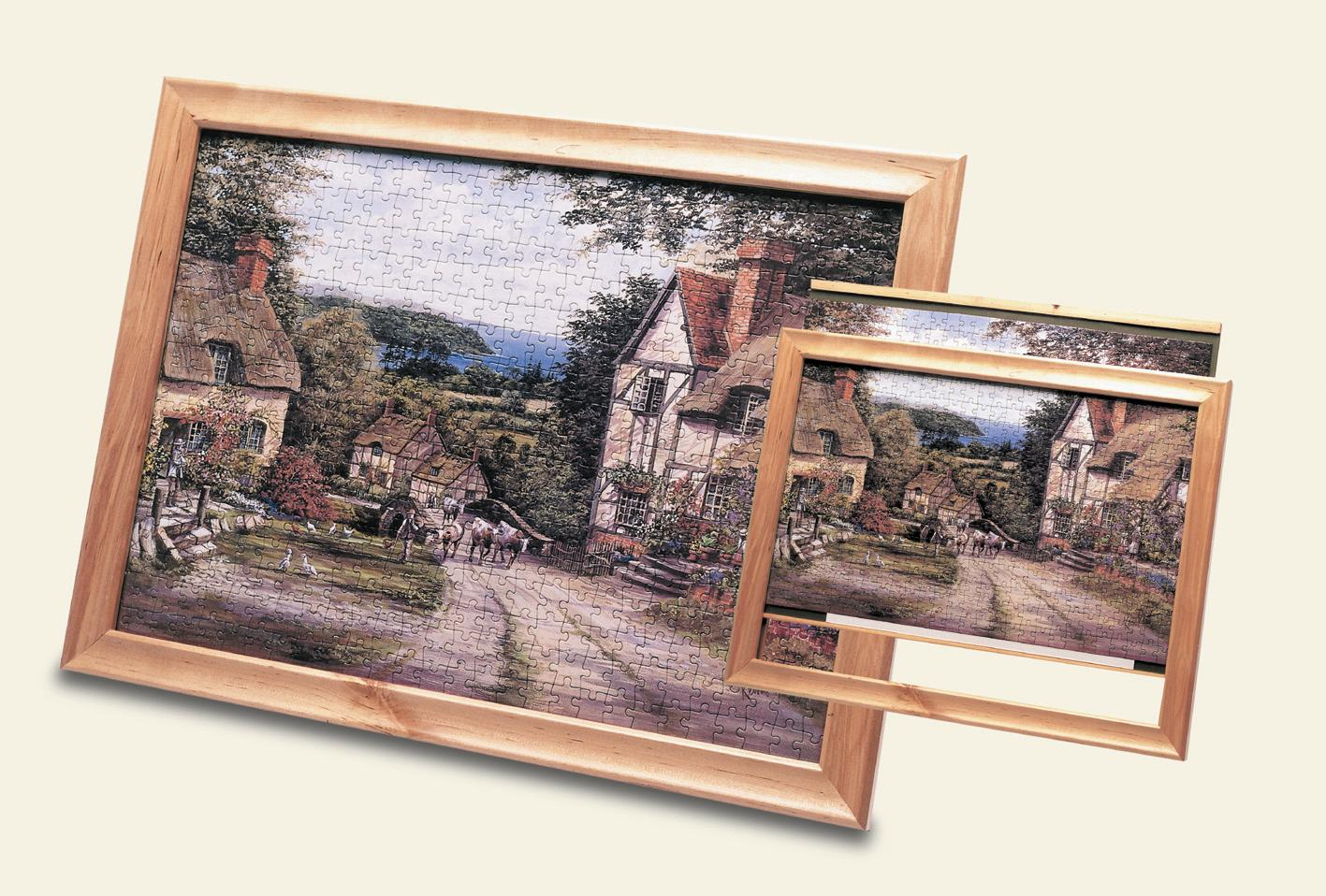
Jigframe enables puzzles to be hung on a wall.

Traditionally (especially in Japan) jigsaw puzzles that are hung on a wall are glued onto a backing board. Once glued, it is a simple process to fit a puzzle into a frame in much the same way as a picture is fitted in a picture frame. However, gluing a puzzle to a board renders it unusable in the future as a puzzle. Products like the Jigframe resolve this issue with a shallow drawer incorporated into the frame that allows jigsaws to be framed without the use of glue.

=== Storage cases ===
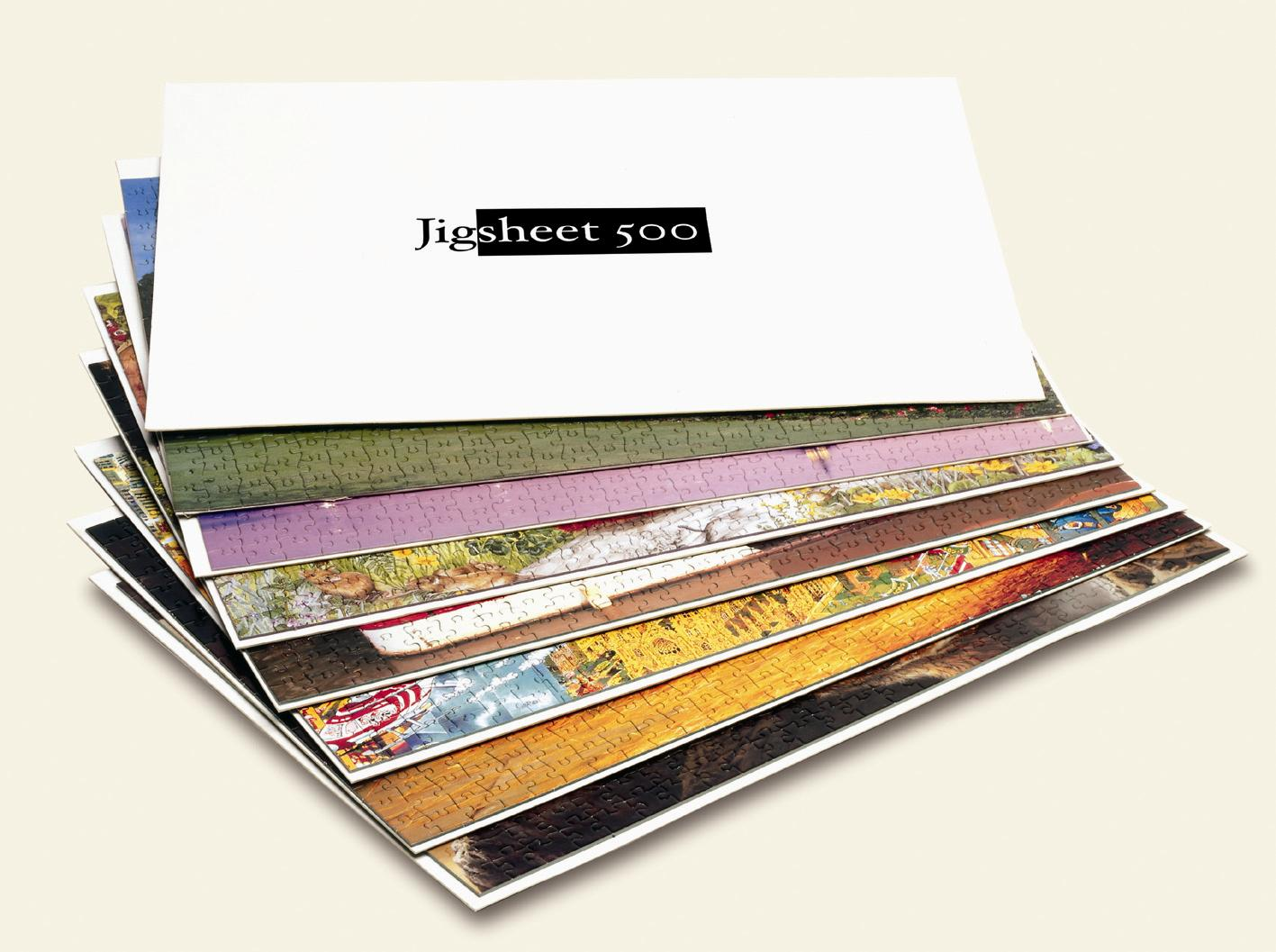
Jigstore puzzles can be stored in their completed state.

The product is sold with 10 cardboard sheets on which completed puzzles are stored. The puzzles along with their cardboard sheets are stacked on top of each other in the manner of a multi-tiered sandwich. Ultimately the entire sandwich is held together with straps that are provided and then the whole is stored in an outer cardboard case. This accessory may be used by dedicated enthusiasts or at schools and clubs, where there is a requirement to keep and display many completed puzzles.
