= Francis Kodankandath =

Indian contemporary artist

Francis Kodankandath (born 1 June 1960) is an Indian contemporary artist. He won the 2003–2004 National Academy Award and the 1993 Kerala Lalit Kala Academy Award.He is son of Prof.K.P Antony and Mrs.Achamma Antony. He is a member of the Thandikkal Kodankandath family, Manaloor, Trichur, Kerala.

== Work series ==
The Art of Happiness was inaugurated by the Dalai Lama at Cochin, Kerala on 25 November 2012. Having evolved over more than two years, the series is a combination of paintings and sculptures portraying the pain, suffering, and aspirations of the Tibetan community spread across the world in exile. These paintings also symbolize the compassion of the Tibetan people towards their motherland as well as their expectation that one day they will be able to return to a free land that they would be able to call their own. They also represent the agony of all downtrodden communities living in every part of the world.

A significant aspect of this series is that the background colors change consistently with the seven notes of music. The basic colors used are red, orange, yellow, green, blue, indigo and violet, the colors of the rainbow. The sculptures are placed over the background, giving the motifs and the core ideas of the paintings as butterflies, flowers, spiders, and elephants. The metallic sculptures used in the series evolved out of the thought process of Sherly Joseph Chalissery, wife of Kodankandath.

Restoration Within was the National Academy Award-winning painting in 2003–2004. A restoration of a painting is the subject of this artwork in which the restoration of a cathedral is being examined by the artist. This work is considered a first-time experiment in the history of contemporary art in which the intricacies of restoration of a colossal structure has been utilized as a subject by the creator.

First Supper won the 1993 Kerala State Award by the Lalita Kala Academy. The peculiarity of this painting is that it looks like a jigsaw puzzle in which the communication takes place when the viewer takes the effort to place the equally important pieces of colors in the perfect perspective.

Decoding Da Vinci—Selected by 'Swarnarekha' (Exhibition of National & Triennial Awardees, Lalit Kala Academy, New Delhi). The original idea of Leonardo da Vinci in his work The Last Supper was to convey the establishment of Holy Mass geometrically. This was misinterpreted by author Dan Brown in his book The Da Vinci Code as he put forth the notion of a lady in the painting. Through a series of paintings titled Decoding Da Vinci that was conceived in research spanning a period of 13 years, the painter reinvented the original concept of da Vinci. This painting was appreciated by the Catholic Church and Cardinal Paul Paupard, a former cultural minister of Pope John Paul II during a visit to the Pilar Seminary in Goa, India. A painting from this series was also presented to Pope John Paul II during the year 2005.

== Credits and acclaims ==
=== Indian ===
- National Academy Award 2003–2004 for the work titled Restoration Within
- Kerala State Award for Painting - Kerala Lalit Kala Academy 1993 for the work titled First Supper
- Highly Commended Certificate – Kerala Lalit Kala Academy 1986
- Highly Commended Certificate – Kerala Lalit Kala Academy 1990
- Painting selected and published by Reader’s Digest as cover of July 2001 issue
- Nominated as Member – Kerala Lalit Kala Academy during 1994–1997
- Painting Selected for National Exhibition of Art 1994 & 2004 – Lalit Kala Academy, New Delhi, India

=== International ===
- Certificate of Merit from UN (Population fund - UNFPO) and N.C.E.R.T Delhi 1997
- Painting selected as permanent exhibit by Newman centre, University of New Orleans USA 2000
- Paintings series named Tribute to the Heritage and Essence of the United Arab Emirates selected by Dubai Police General Headquarters

=== Others ===
- Honorable Mention Certificate from I.I.T, Chennai. - 2003
- Certificate of Merit from Lokmanya Tilak National Exhibition of Art Pune - 2003
- Painting Selected for National Exhibition of Art 1994 & 2004 – Lalit Kala Academy, New – Delhi
- Selected for National Artists Camp by Kerala Lalit Kala Academy 2003
- Nominated as Member –Kerala Lalit Kala Academy during 1994–1997
- Skyscapes- series of paintings (40 Nos) done on abroad in flight Indian Airlines 2000–2001
- Painting selected by' Reader’s Digest 'as cover of July 2001 issue
- 800 sq. Mural painting executed at Sir Viswasharaya Hall I.I.T.Chennai
- Selected for international Artists camp by Srishti Art Gallery, Hyderabad 2004
- Series of paintings De-coding Da Vinci - 2004.
- Selected by 'The Week' Magazine to paint the portrait of Mrs. Indira Gandhi, former Prime Minister of India, for Nov. 2004 issue
- Selected by The India Today Group to paint the portrait of Dr.A.P.J.Abdul Kalam, the President of India, for their special 50th Anniversary issue of Reader's Digest Magazine, Dec. 2005
- The Painting 'Decoding Da Vinci was selected by 'Swarnrekha' Exhibition of National & Triennale Awardees, Lalit Kala Akademi New Delhi
- Raja Ravi Varma Death Centenary Exhibition
- KCBC State Media Award 2006
- Best Turn out Award on Republic Day 2006, Customs & Central Excise Commissionerate, Calicut
- Vocational Excellence Award 2006-Rotary Club International
- Varna Jyoti Puraskaram 2011 by Karnataka Sangeeta Nadaka Akademi, Calicut
- Certificate of Appreciation 2012 – Calicut Management Association (CMA)
