= Past Time =

Past Time may refer to:

- Past Time (Grass Widow album), 2010
- Past Time, a 1993 album by Eva O

== See also ==
- Pastime (disambiguation)
- Past Times
- Past Times (painting)
