= Liberty Puzzles =

American jigsaw puzzle manufacturer

Liberty Puzzles, LLC
- Company type: Private
- Founded: Boulder, Colorado (2005)
- Founder: Christopher Wirth, Jeffrey Eldridge
- Headquarters: Boulder, Colorado
- Area served: Worldwide
- Products: Wooden jigsaw puzzles
- Number of employees: ~130 (2024)
- Website: www.libertypuzzles.com US & Worldwide website

Liberty Puzzles is an American manufacturer of classic style wooden jigsaw puzzles based in Boulder, Colorado.

== History ==
Liberty Puzzles was founded in 2005 by Christopher Wirth and his business partner Jeffrey Eldridge, after Wirth’s family inherited several hand-cut wooden puzzles from the 1930s. Surprised by the value of hand-cut wooden jigsaw puzzles (which can sell for more than $1,000 each), Wirth decided to start a business using modern cutting technologies, with a goal of producing puzzles in the $100 range. Wirth is the son of former Colorado senator Tim Wirth.

Liberty Puzzles was the largest or second largest wooden jigsaw puzzle manufacturer in America as of 2011. In 2014, the company opened a retail location on the Pearl Street Mall in Boulder. Sales show a strongly seasonal pattern, with peak sales occurring at the end of November, during the Black Friday shopping phenomenon.

Liberty Puzzles experienced a surge in popularity during the early days of the COVID-19 pandemic. In March 2020, they had a backlog of 10,000 orders and were forced to institute a waiting list to purchase puzzles of up to 60 days. After the COVID-19 lockdowns ended, they expanded their facilities and ramped up production. Demand softened considerably when pandemic-related restrictions ended, but the Christmas shopping season in 2023 was strong enough that they were once again overwhelmed by orders.

The puzzles are made in Boulder with archival paper and inks adhered to quarter-inch maple plywood cut with computer-controlled laser cutters. As of 2020, the company owned 44 laser cutters, each capable of producing one 500-piece puzzle per hour. By 2024, the company had nearly 130 employees.

== Designs ==
The company offers over 650 different puzzle images. The image selections have an emphasis on fine art, vintage prints and Asian art. The puzzle designs are modeled after the puzzles popular in the early-twentieth century. Liberty's puzzles include a relatively large number of whimsy pieces (pieces shaped recognizably, for example, as storks or swans), reaching over 20% of the pieces in some puzzles. Most Liberty Puzzles include the company's signature whimsy piece in the shape of an eagle.
