= Artifact Puzzles =

American Toy Company

Coordinates: 47.651397°N 122.33075°W

Artifact Puzzles is a manufacturer of wooden jigsaw puzzles operating out of Port Townsend, Washington (previously in Fremont, California). The business was founded in 2009 by University of Washington electrical engineering professor Maya Gupta, and was originally based in Seattle, Washington. Unlike traditional wooden jigsaw puzzles which are hand-cut by jigsaw, Artifact Puzzles laser-cuts 1/4" thick high quality 3-ply environmentally-friendly plywood and uses soy-based inks.

The puzzle pieces are designed by an artist for each new puzzle, and do not follow a consistent style of cut. For example, some of their puzzles have traditional knob connectors, while others have piece connectors shape like clouds, hearts, bird feet, horse hooves, and ancient Greek symbols. Like traditional wooden jigsaw puzzles, most of their puzzles have "whimsy pieces", which are pieces shaped like recognizable objects. These pieces are designed to match the theme of each puzzle, and range from a cow jumping over a moon in one of their Daniel Merriam puzzles, to pieces shaped like ballerinas in their Degas puzzle. The company has designed and manufactures over 250 different puzzles of a broad range of art, with an unusually large selection of whimsical neo-surrealist art and 16th century art.
