= Gerald Garston =

American painter

Gerald Drexler Garston (May 4, 1925 – April 5, 1994) was an American painter and printmaker who lived in Connecticut. Garston is known for his works of sports figures, geometric shapes, and animals.

== Exhibitions ==
Gartson's exhibitions include numerous solo and group exhibitions at locations including New York, Boston, and Connecticut. His best-known work, "Pastime," which depicts a baseball player holding an American flag, was the centerpiece of "Diamonds are Forever," the Smithsonian Institution's traveling exhibition of baseball art.

== Museum collections ==
- DeCordova Museum, Lincoln, Massachusetts
- Fogg Museum, Harvard University, Cambridge, Massachusetts
- Los Angeles County Museum, Los Angeles, California
- Philadelphia Museum of Art, Philadelphia, Pennsylvania
- Rose Museum, Brandeis University, Waltham, Massachusetts
- Wadsworth Athenaeum, Hartford, Connecticut
- William Rockhill Nelson Gallery of Art, Kansas City, Missouri

== Publications ==
A Monograph, The Art of Gerald Garston: A Good Life in Your Eyes with an essay by: Alicia Currier Kallay, Foreword by: Bud Collins was published in 2005
