= Par Puzzles =

American jigsaw puzzle manufacturer

Par Company, Ltd.
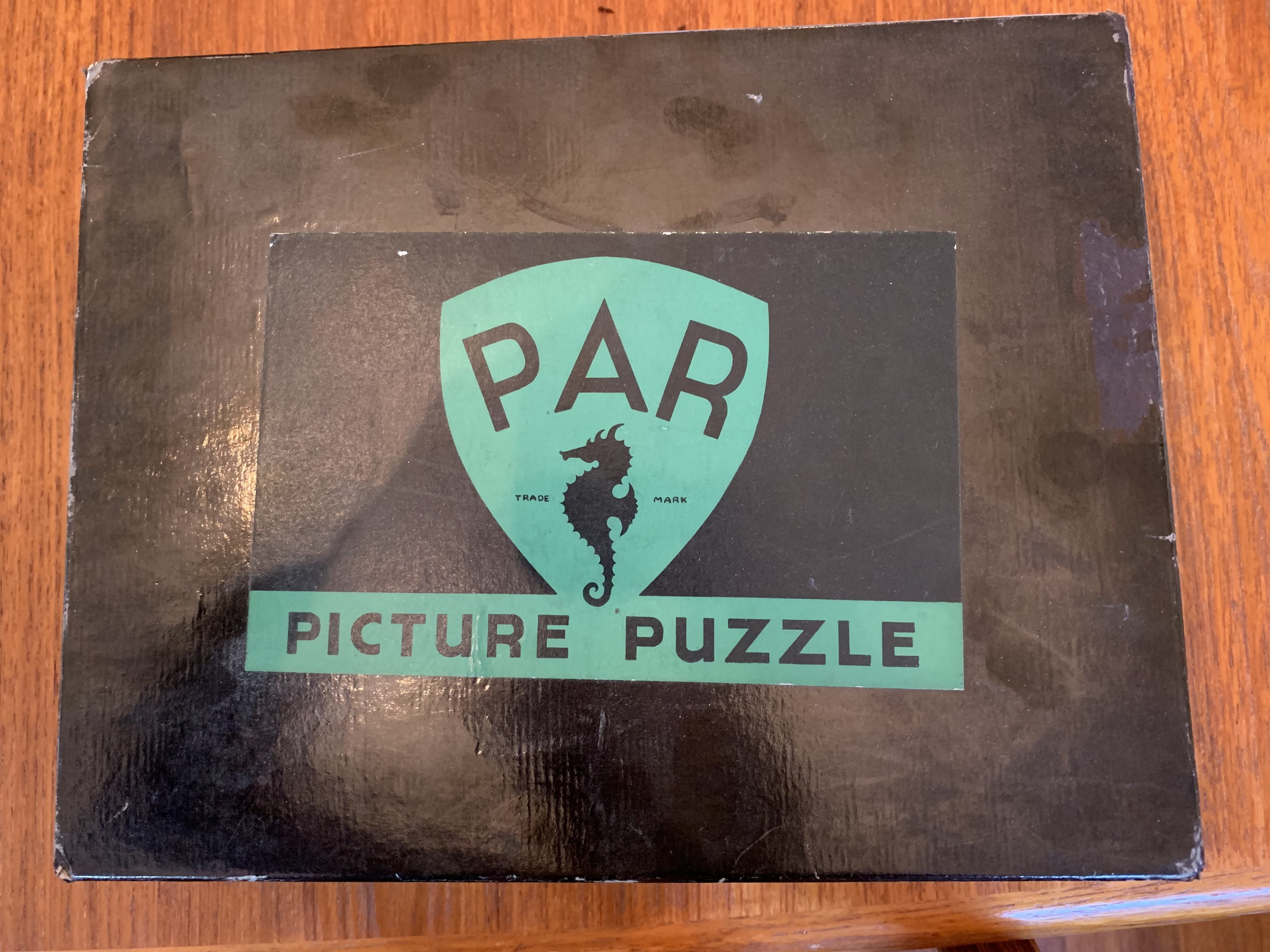
- A vintage Par puzzle box
- Founded: 1932; 94 years ago in New York City
- Founders: John N. Henriques; Frank Q. Ware
- Headquarters: Coram, New York, U.S.
- Products: Hand-cut wooden jigsaw puzzles

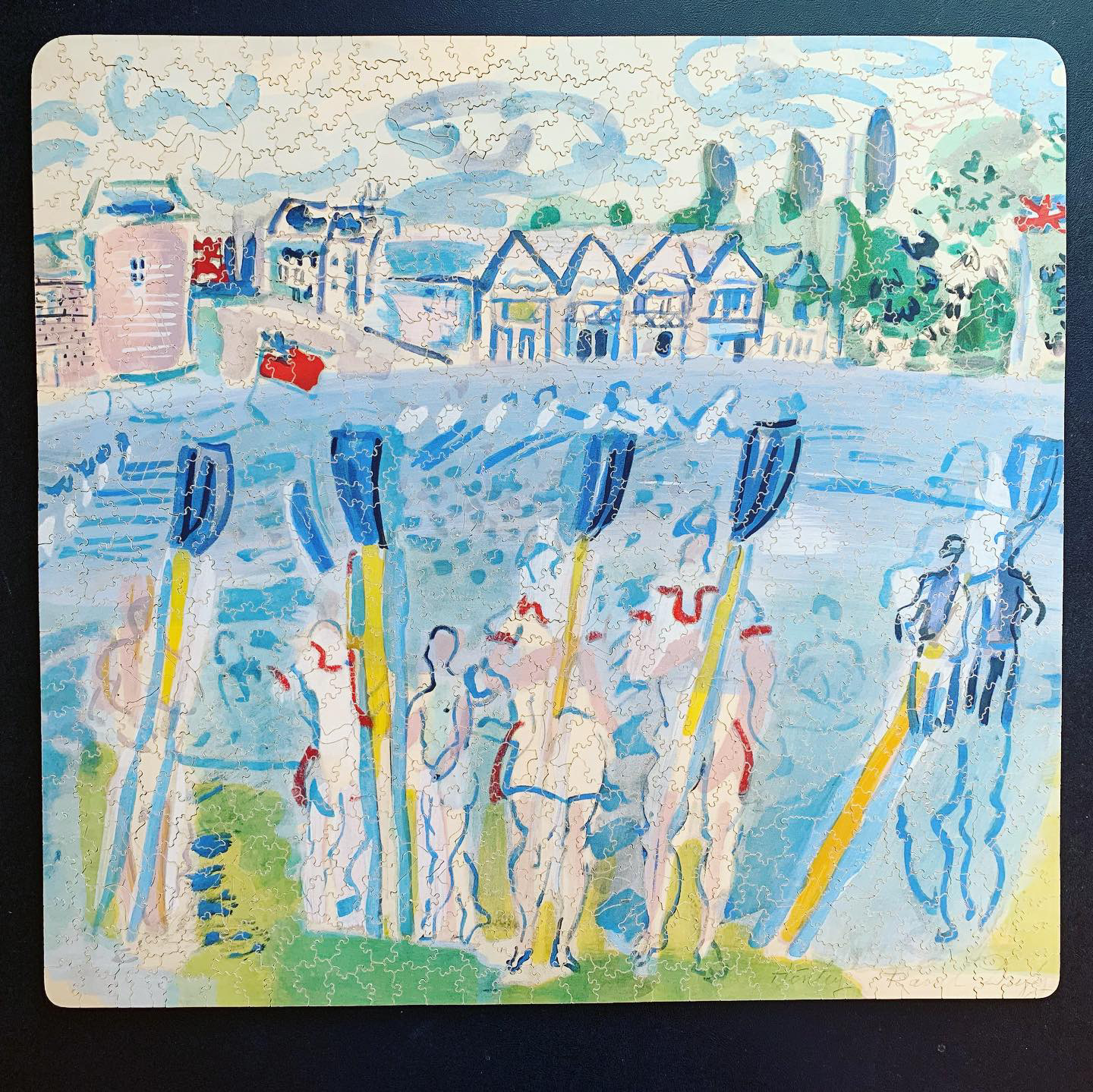
A vintage Par Puzzle featuring a print of Raoul Dufy's painting of the Henley Royal Regatta.

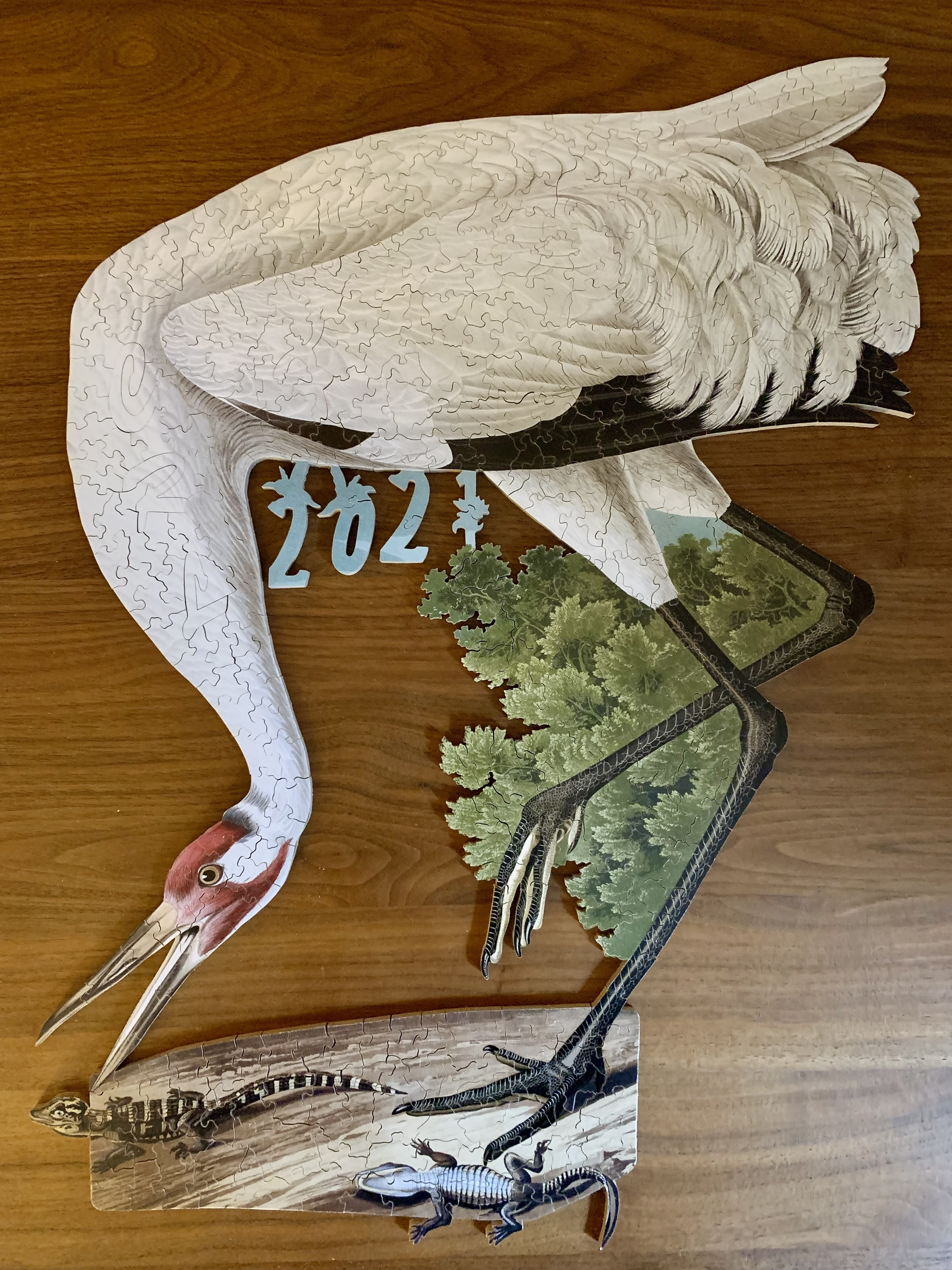
A modern hand-cut Par Puzzle made by the Maddens featuring art from John James Audubon's Birds of North America. The puzzle has an irregular edge, a feature typical of vintage and modern Pars.

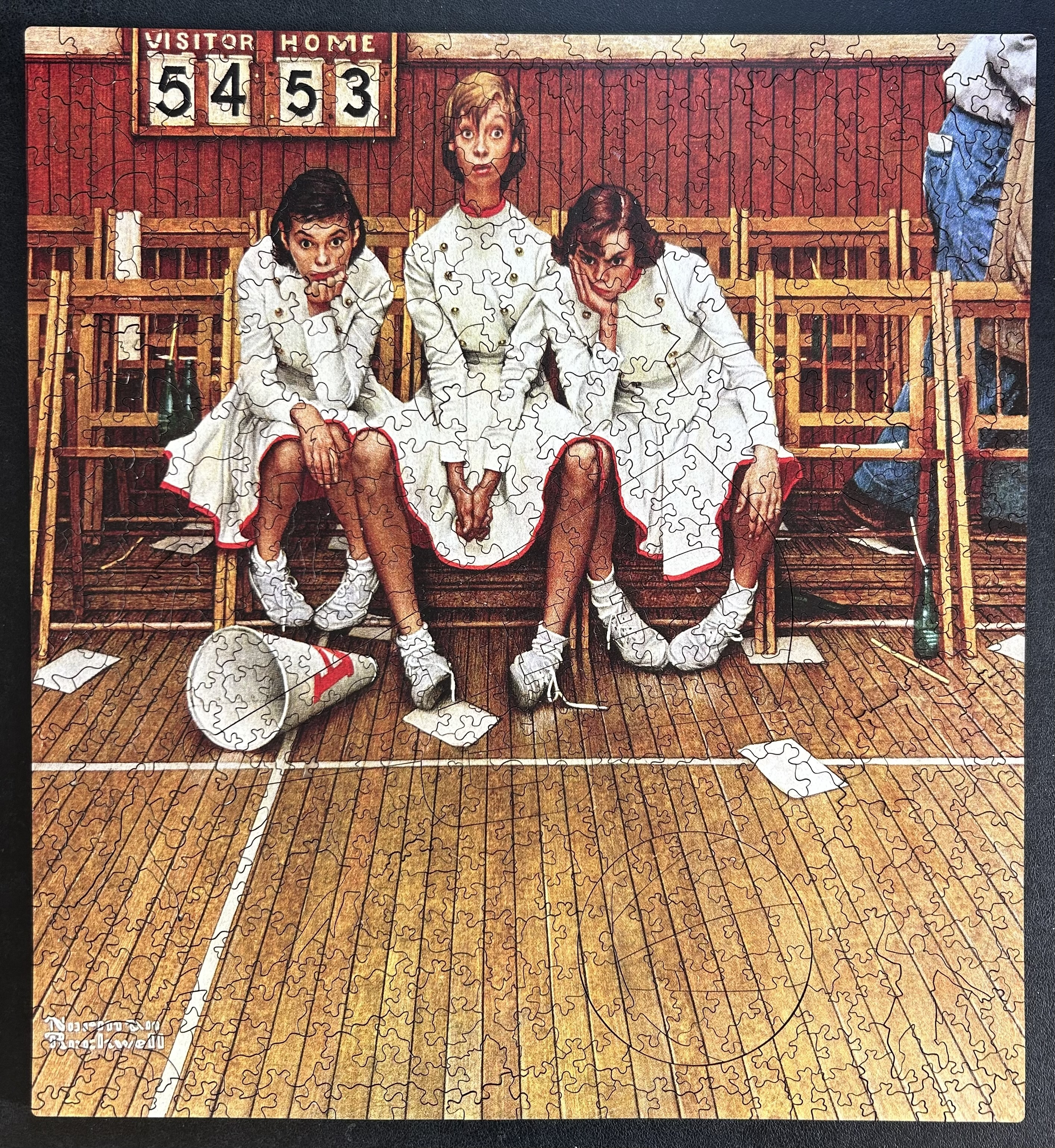
"Buzzer Beaten," a limited edition laser-cut wooden jigsaw puzzle made in a collaboration between Par Puzzles and a Canadian laser-cut puzzle brand, Stumpcraft Puzzles. The puzzle features art by Norman Rockwell.

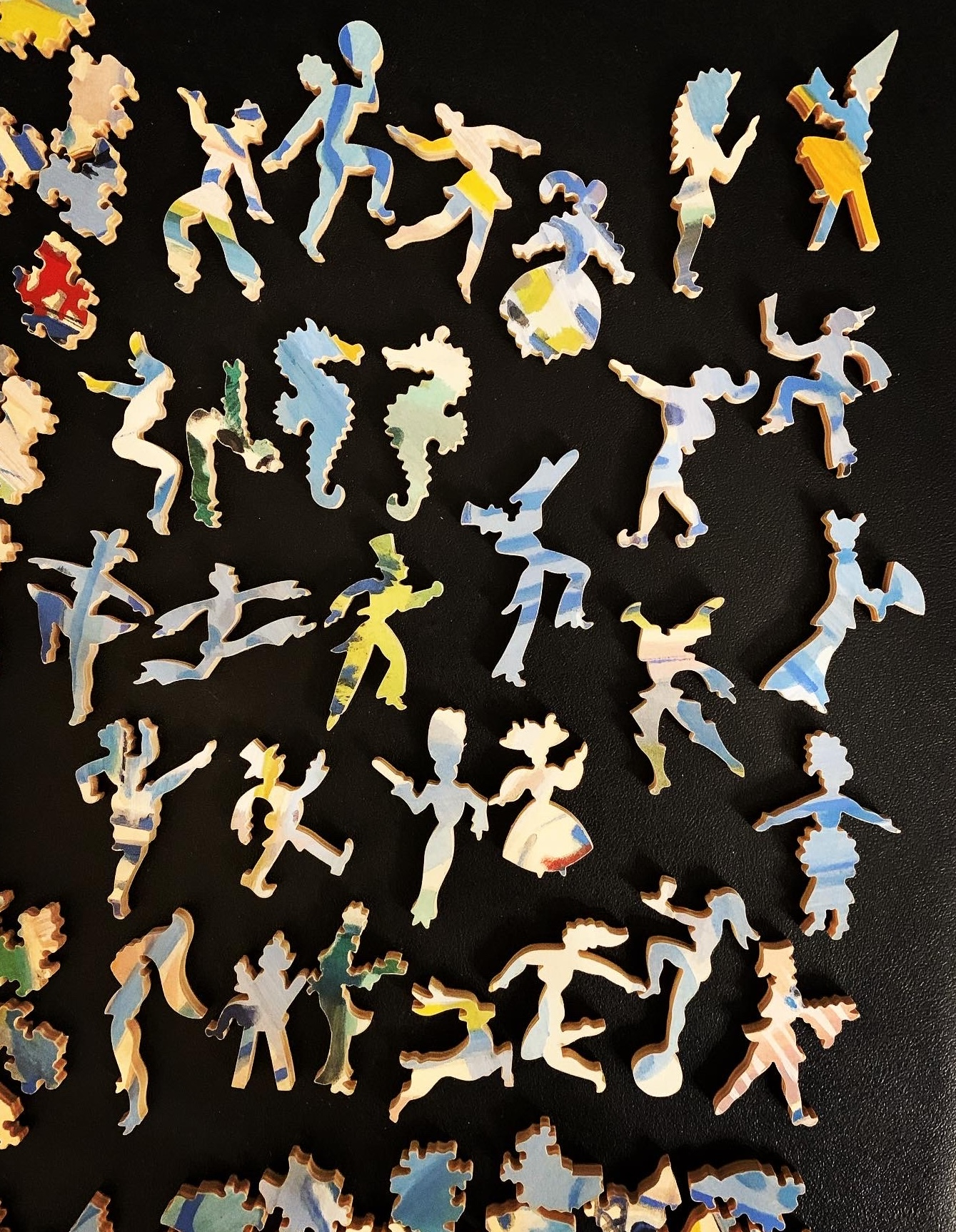
Figure pieces from a vintage Par Puzzle, including two seahorses, Par's signature piece, as well as dancers, a deer, a child in a high chair, and other figures.

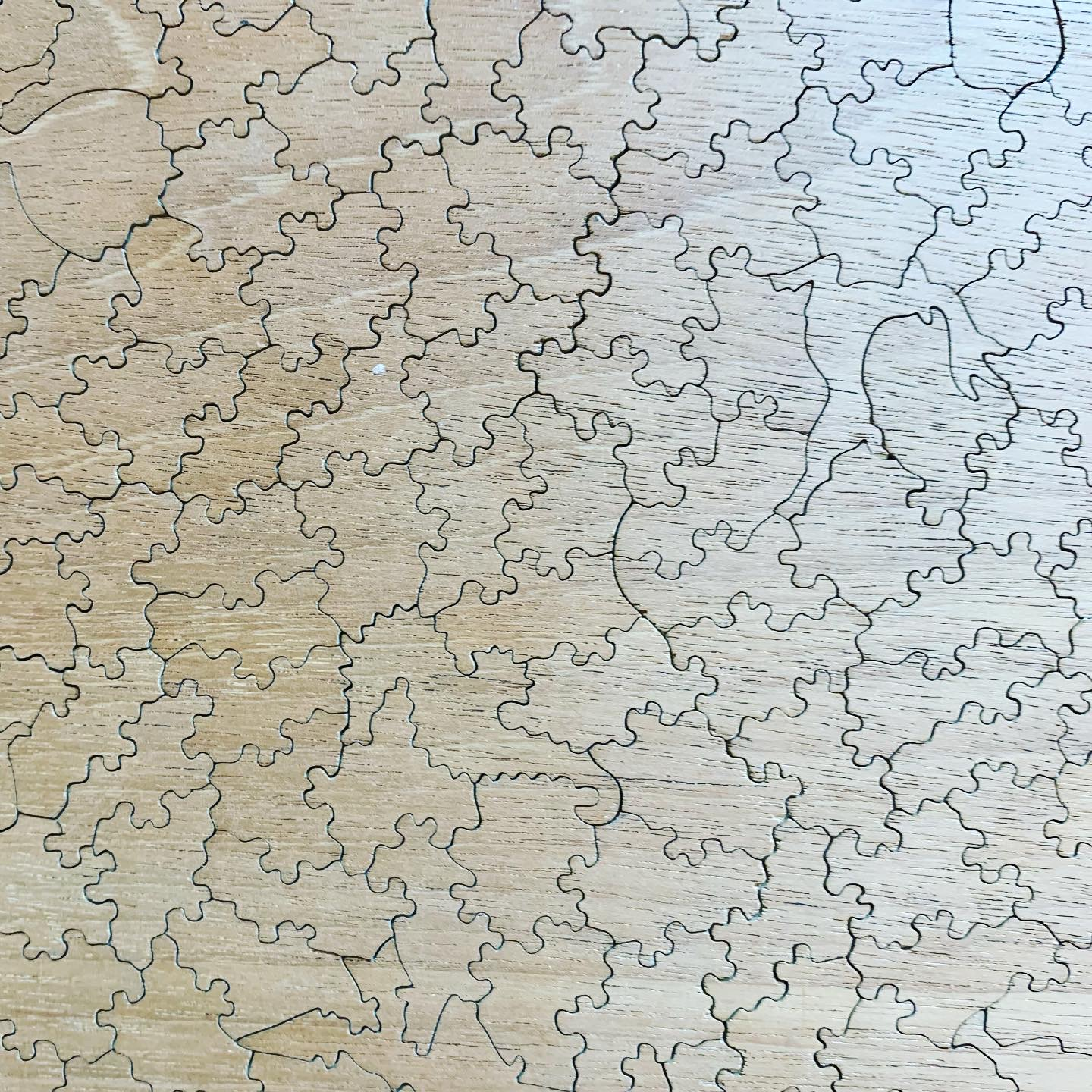
Back of a vintage Par puzzle, showing the mahogany back of the plywood. Also visible are figure pieces interspersed among many standard pieces.

Par Company, Ltd. or Par Puzzles is an American manufacturer of wooden jigsaw puzzles founded in New York City in 1932 by John N. Henriques and Frank Q. Ware. The company became known for expensive, custom-made puzzles made for a wealthy and celebrity clientele, and for features such as irregular edges, stylized figure pieces, false interior edges, "drop-outs" of negative space, and a seahorse-shaped signature piece. The company's name refers to the "par time" printed on each puzzle box, an estimate of how long a skilled solver should take to complete the puzzle. The business remains in operation in Coram, New York under Justin Madden.

== History ==
=== Founding ===
Frank Quarles Ware (1903–1984) grew up in Garrison, New York, and by 1928 was the advertising director for Pennsylvania-Dixie Cement in New York City. John Nunes Henriques (1903–1972) was from New York and sold real estate in the city in the late 1920s. Both men lost their jobs at the start of the Great Depression, toured Europe for about six months, and returned to New York in 1931 still unemployed.

Henriques's family had been avid puzzlers, and the two men began cutting jigsaw puzzles to occupy their time, producing their first puzzles for themselves and friends. The very first puzzle they made was a Matisse print mounted on a fir panel that they cut at home using a coping saw. As a nationwide jigsaw puzzle craze

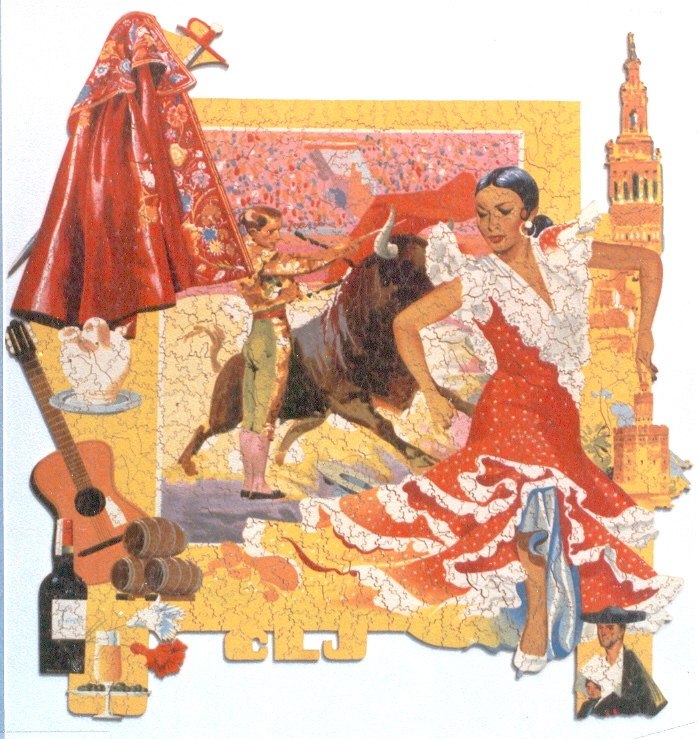
"Fancy Footwork," a personalized vintage Par puzzle that appears to be made from a vintage travel poster for Spain. The initials "C L J" are cut away as negative space along the bottom. The puzzle has an irregular outer edge.

intensified during the Depression, they turned their hobby into a business in 1932, buying an electric scroll saw, walnut plywood, and art prints, and setting up a workshop in the basement of the Henriques home at 419 West 154th Street. They delivered rental puzzles around New York by suitcase, and a window display of their puzzles near the Harvard Club in Manhattan helped them attract an affluent and influential clientele. By 1936 the company had moved to a two-story penthouse studio at 18 East 53rd Street. By 1940 it employed a staff of five in addition to the two founders.

=== Second World War ===
During World War II the company was required to open its records to the Federal Bureau of Investigation and to British intelligence after Axis agents were found to have concealed coded messages inside hollowed-out wooden puzzle pieces bound for Trinidad; Par was not involved. Rentals increased during the war years.

=== Later ownership ===
Henriques died in 1972. In 1974 Ware turned the saws, materials, and customer list over to Arthur Gallagher (1922–1989), a longtime Par cutter who began with the company as a messenger in the late 1930s and learned to cut in the 1940s. Gallagher moved the business to North Massapequa on Long Island and cut 100 to 150 puzzles a year. Ware died in 1984.

Gallagher retired in the early 1980s and passed the business to John Madden, who had apprenticed under him. By 1991 Madden was cutting about 20 puzzles a year of 500 to 1,700 pieces. John Madden has since retired, and as of the 2020s the company was operated by his son Justin Madden in Coram, New York, producing hand-cut wooden puzzles as well as a line of laser-cut puzzles.

== Puzzles and cutting style ==
Par initially made its puzzles from three-ply wood with a walnut backing; however, because the walnut splintered easily, the company switched to three-ply wood backed with Honduras mahogany, which it used through the 1940s before moving to five-ply mahogany in the 1950s. During a period when their normal wood supply was unavailable, Par imported mahogany logs directly from a plantation in Belize, an arrangement made through a customer in the diplomatic corps. The firm used thin German saw blades that measured seven-thousandths of an inch, and said it had worked with chemists to develop a special glue that would withstand cutting and repeated handling.

Special puzzle cutting techniques associated with Par included irregular outer edges, split corners, false straight edges placed inside the puzzle, cutting along color boundaries, and "drop-outs" of negative space within the image. Henriques was the faster cutter and cut more puzzles than Ware. Par also had distinct-looking figure pieces that included dancers, athletes, and animals that were designed by Ware. Figure pieces were also frequently customized, incorporating monograms, initials, significant dates, or other shapes relevant to the puzzle's subject matter or recipient, such as babies in high chairs for an expectant mother. The company's signature piece was originally a backwards swastika; after the symbol was adopted by the Nazis, Par replaced it with a seahorse, a shape suggested by the drama critic (and Par customer) Alexander Woollcott. Most Par puzzles included at least one seahorse piece, often two or even more. Later puzzles also sometimes featured a pair of golden seahorses sketched onto the puzzle image.

Puzzles were sold in black boxes bearing no image of the completed picture. The company gave many puzzles ambiguous or playful titles (e.g., "Bobby's Beat" for a London street scene) and sometimes fanciful par times (e.g., "Forever and Ever" for a wedding collage puzzle); the par time was initially derived from the founders' own solving times and later was estimated. Typical puzzles ran from about 500 to 750 pieces, though the company produced much larger commissions, including a 10,000-piece puzzle in the 1940s with a par time of "Days and nights".

Image sources ranged from fine art prints by Matisse, Picasso, Gauguin, Dufy, and Dalí to circus and travel posters and customers' own photographs and artwork. Ware and Henriques also made puzzles of more conventional subjects such as hunting scenes and seascapes at customers' request, and occasionally of risqué subjects, including Playboy centerfolds. The company made a puzzle of one of Picasso's own prints as a gift for the artist, which Picasso is said to have loved.

== Business model and clientele ==
Originally, Par both sold and rented puzzles. They did not distribute through retailers; customers placed their orders directly. Rentals were delivered by messenger within Manhattan and by mail elsewhere, and returned puzzles were checked for completeness before being rented again. The rental business operated for more than 30 years before Par discontinued it in the 1960s, when checking for missing pieces became too time-consuming; at this point, Par sold off all of its rental stock, and vintage Par puzzles that were rentals can be identified by serial numbers on the box label. The company offered subscriptions to customers who wanted a new puzzle every week or every month. Prices rose over the company's history, from custom hand-cut puzzles priced at two cents per piece in 1940 to roughly one dollar per piece by the 1990s and three dollars a piece in 2026.

Ware and Henriques were theater buffs, and as angel investors in Broadway musicals they found many puzzle customers among show business performers and aficionados. Sources report that Par's clientele included Gary Cooper, Humphrey Bogart, Bing Crosby, Marlene Dietrich, Jimmy Durante, Marilyn Monroe, Dwight D. Eisenhower, the Duke and Duchess of Windsor, Clare Boothe Luce, Edsel Ford, and members of the Astor, Vanderbilt, Du Pont, and Rockefeller families. In the 1990s the company made puzzles for George H. W. Bush and Barbara Bush, including one incorporating small elephant-shaped pieces holding the initials "GB".
