= John Spilsbury (cartographer) =

British inventor of the jigsaw puzzle (1739–1769)

- Born: 1739
- Died: 3 April 1769 (aged 29–30)
- Occupation: Cartographer
- Known for: First commercial maker of the jigsaw puzzle

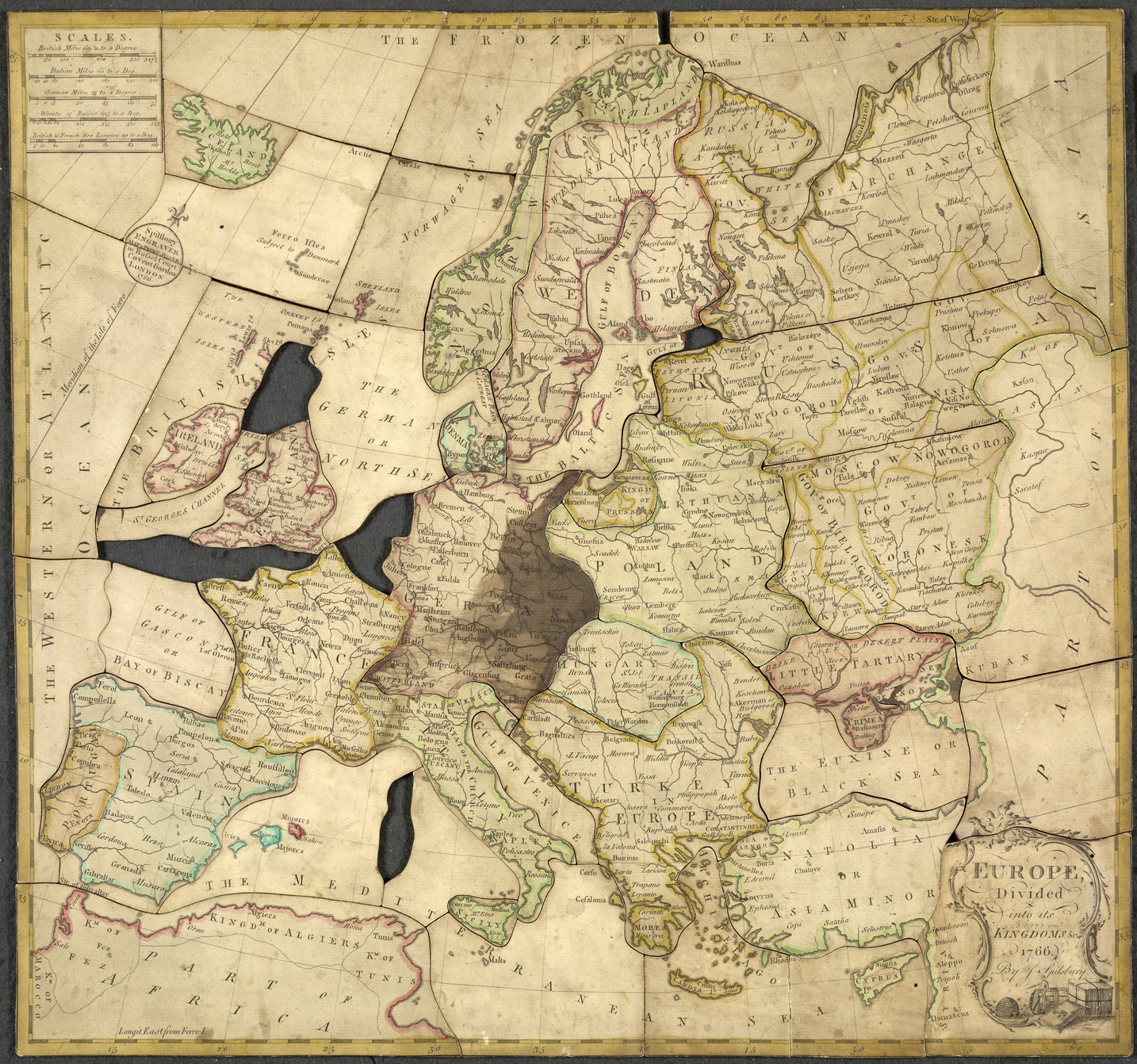
"Europe divided into its kingdoms, etc." (1766) Believed to be the first purpose-made jigsaw puzzle

John Spilsbury (/I.P.A. spɪlsbəri/ 1739 – 3 April 1769) was an English cartographer and engraver. He is credited as the inventor of the jigsaw puzzle. Spilsbury created them for educational purposes, and called them "Dissected Maps".

== Life and works ==
John Spilsbury was the second of three sons of Thomas Spilsbury; the engraver Jonathan Spilsbury was his elder brother, and the two have sometimes been confused. He served as an apprentice to Thomas Jefferys, the Royal Geographer to King George III.

Spilsbury advertised himself as an 'engraver and map dissector in wood' in 1763 and is almost certainly the earliest commercial producer of jigsaw puzzles. He created the first puzzle in 1766 as an educational tool to teach geography. He affixed a world map to wood and carved each country out to create the first puzzle. Sensing a business opportunity, he created puzzles on eight themes - the World, Europe, Asia, Africa, America, England and Wales, Ireland, and Scotland.

Another individual has been identified as a maker of map puzzles before Spilsbury was selling his wares: Madame de Beaumont, a French author and educator living in England from 1748-1762. Madame de Beaumont's 'wooden maps' are referred to in letters sent in 1759 and 1762, predating the sale of Spilsbury's puzzles.

Spilsbury married Sarah May of Newmarket, Suffolk in 1761. After his death she ran his business for a period, then married Harry Ashby who had been apprentice to Spilsbury, and who continued to sell puzzles.
