= Jigsaw puzzle =

Type of tiling puzzle

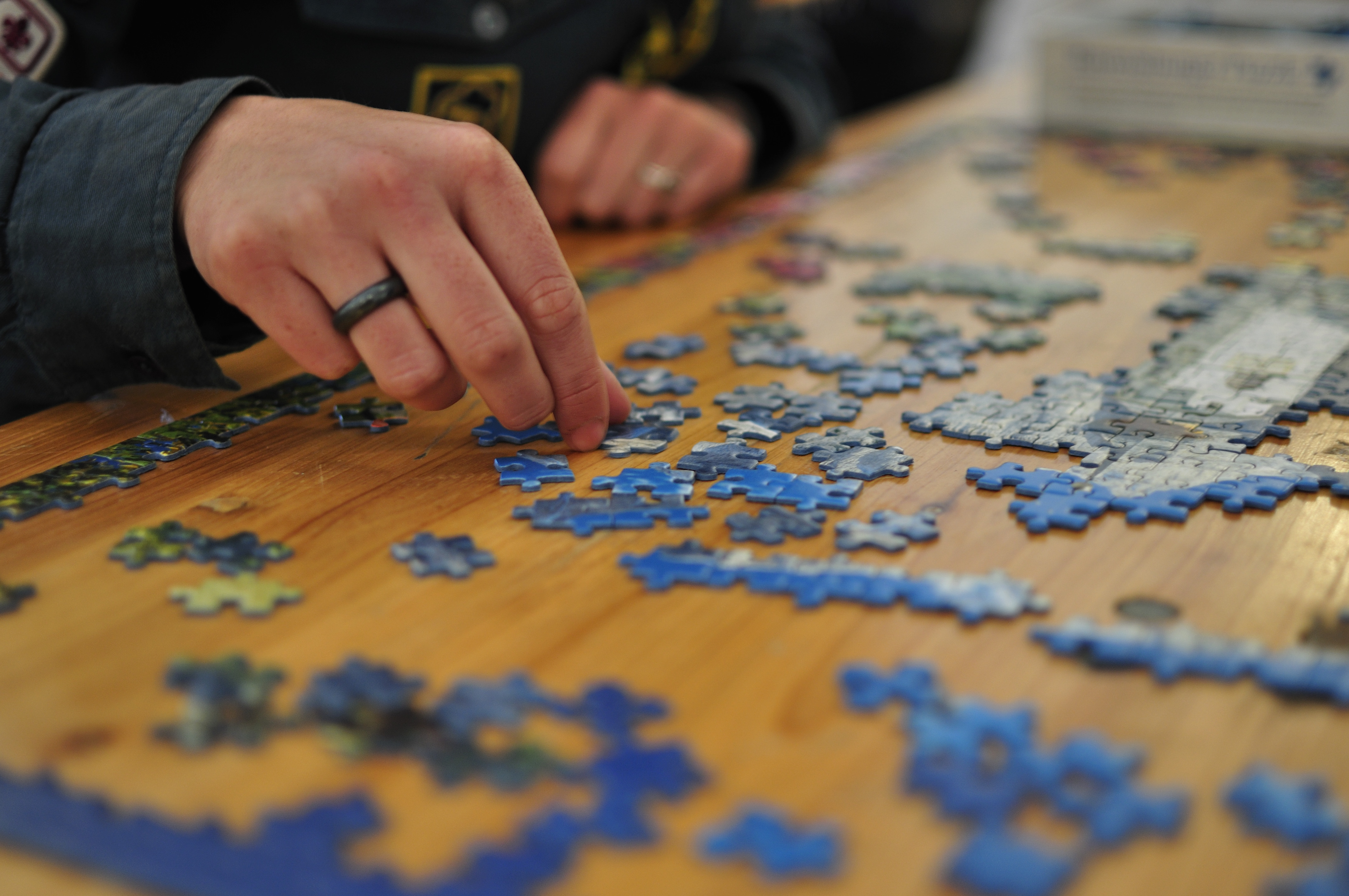
Person solving a jigsaw puzzle

A jigsaw puzzle (with context, sometimes just jigsaw or just puzzle) is a tiling puzzle that requires the assembly of often irregularly shaped, interlocking, and mosaicked pieces. Typically each puzzle piece contains a portion of a picture, which is completed by solving the puzzle, in which the picture should match the one shown on its box.

In the 18th century, jigsaw puzzles were created by painting a picture on a flat, rectangular piece of wood, then cutting it into small pieces. The name "jigsaw" derives from the tools used to cut the images into pieces—variably identified as jigsaws, fretsaws or scroll saws. John Spilsbury, a London cartographer and engraver, is credited with commercialising jigsaw puzzles around 1760. His design took world maps, and cut out the individual nations in order for them to be reassembled by students as a geographical teaching aid. They are now made primarily of interlocking cardboard pieces, incorporating a variety of images and artwork.

Jigsaw puzzles have been used in research studies examining cognitive abilities such as mental rotation visuospatial ability in young children.

Typical images on jigsaw puzzles include scenes from nature, buildings, and repetitive designs. Castles and mountains are among traditional subjects, but any picture can be used. Artisan puzzle-makers and companies using technologies for one-off and small print-run puzzles utilize a wide range of subject matter, including optical illusions, unusual art, and personal photographs. In addition to traditional flat, two-dimensional puzzles, three-dimensional puzzles have entered large-scale production, including spherical puzzles and architectural recreations.

A range of jigsaw puzzle accessories, including boards, cases, frames, and roll-up mats, have become available to assist jigsaw puzzle enthusiasts. While most assembled puzzles are disassembled for reuse, they can also be attached to a backing with adhesive and displayed as art.

Competitive jigsaw puzzling has grown in popularity in the 21st century, with both regional and national competitions held in many countries, and annual World Jigsaw Puzzle Championships held from 2019.

== History ==
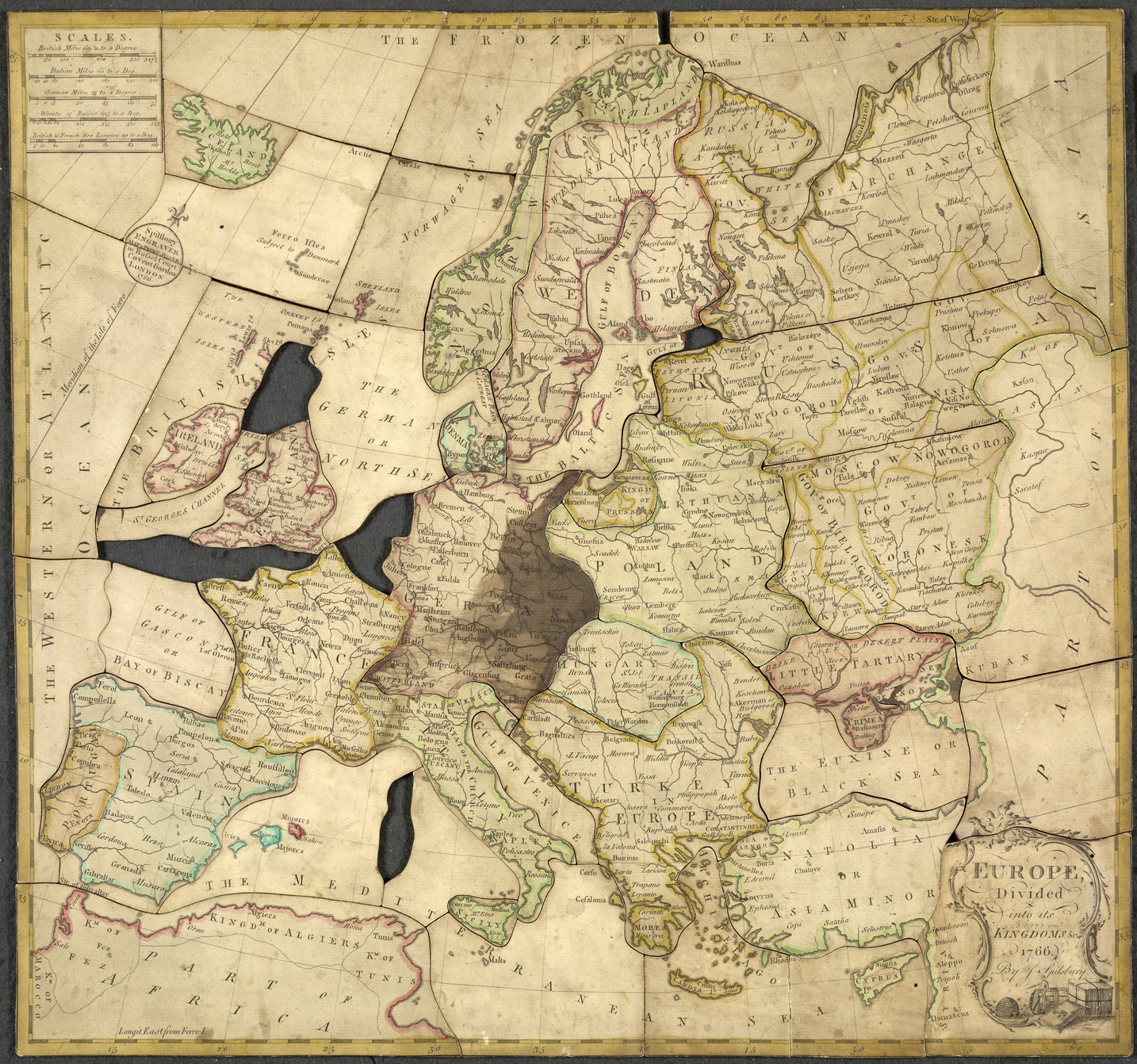
John Spilsbury's "Europe divided into its kingdoms, etc." (1766). He created the jigsaw puzzle for educational purposes, and called them "Dissected Maps".

John Spilsbury is believed to have produced the first commercial jigsaw puzzle around 1760, using a marquetry saw. Jeanne-Marie Leprince de Beaumont, French author and childhood educator, had been using dissected maps or 'wooden maps' in her teaching from as early as 1759.

Early puzzles, known as dissections, were produced by mounting maps on sheets of hardwood and cutting along national boundaries, creating a puzzle useful for teaching geography. Royal governess Lady Charlotte Finch used such "dissected maps" to teach the children of King George III and Queen Charlotte. Cardboard jigsaw puzzles appeared in the late 1800s, but were slow to replace wooden ones because manufacturers felt that cardboard puzzles would be perceived as low-quality, and because profit margins on wooden jigsaws were larger.

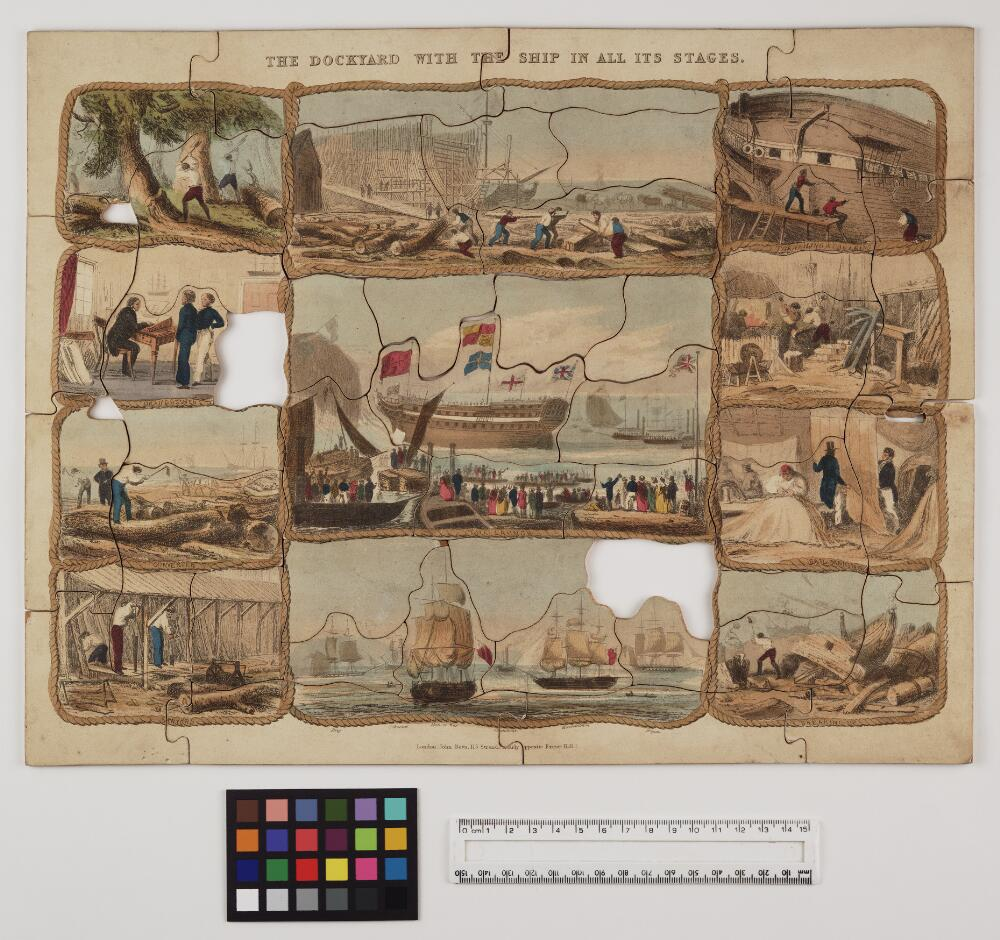
British printed puzzle from 1874

The name "jigsaw" came to be associated with the puzzle around 1880 when fretsaws became the tool of choice for cutting the shapes. Along with fretsaws, jigsaws and scroll saws have also been noted as tools used to cut jigsaw puzzles into pieces. The term "jigsaw puzzle" dates back to 1906.

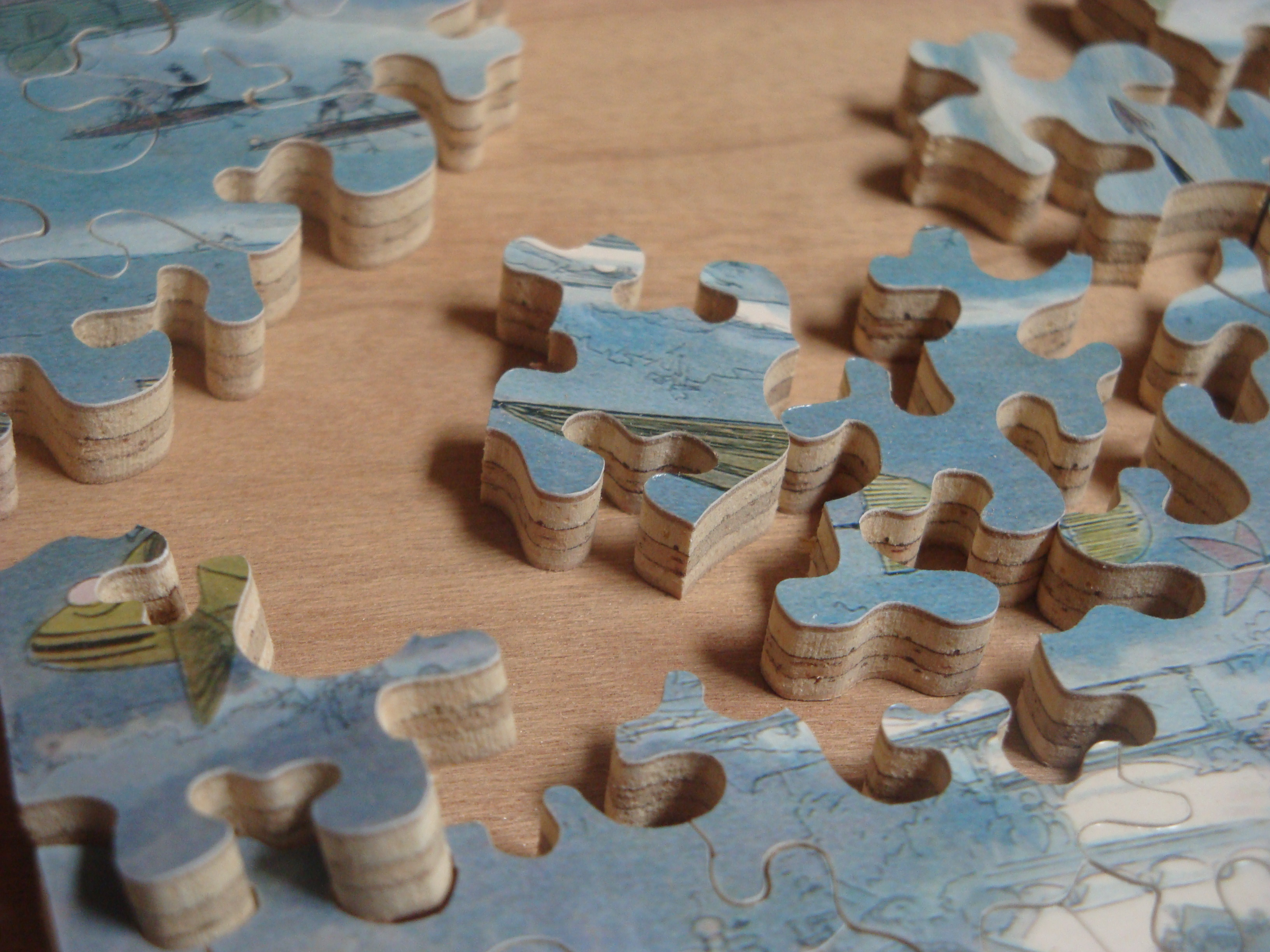
Wooden jigsaw pieces, cut by hand

Jigsaw puzzles first became a craze among adults in the United States from 1907 to 1910, and a year or two later in Europe. These puzzles were typically made from solid wood, and were often non-interlocking, making them very challenging. Adding to the challenge, there was usually no image on the box. Puzzle historian Anne Williams attributes the 1907-1910 puzzle craze to a mix of factors: a poor U.S. economy in 1907, increased participation of middle- and upper-class women in arts and crafts activities like puzzle making, and the introduction of the foot-powered scroll saw. Jigsaw puzzles also soared in popularity during the Great Depression, as they provided a cheap, long-lasting, recyclable form of entertainment. It was around this time that jigsaws evolved to become more complex and appealing to adults. They were also given away in product promotions and used in advertising, with customers completing an image of the promoted product. Some of the largest makers of hand-cut wooden puzzles in the United States in the early 20th century included Pastime Puzzles (made by Parker Brothers), Milton Bradley Premier Puzzles, Par Puzzles, Madmar Puzzles, and J.K.Straus.

Sales of wooden puzzles fell after World War II as improved wages led to price increases, while improvements in manufacturing processes made paperboard jigsaws more attractive.

Demand for jigsaw puzzles saw a surge, comparable to that of the Great Depression, during the COVID-19 pandemic's stay-at-home orders.

== Modern construction ==
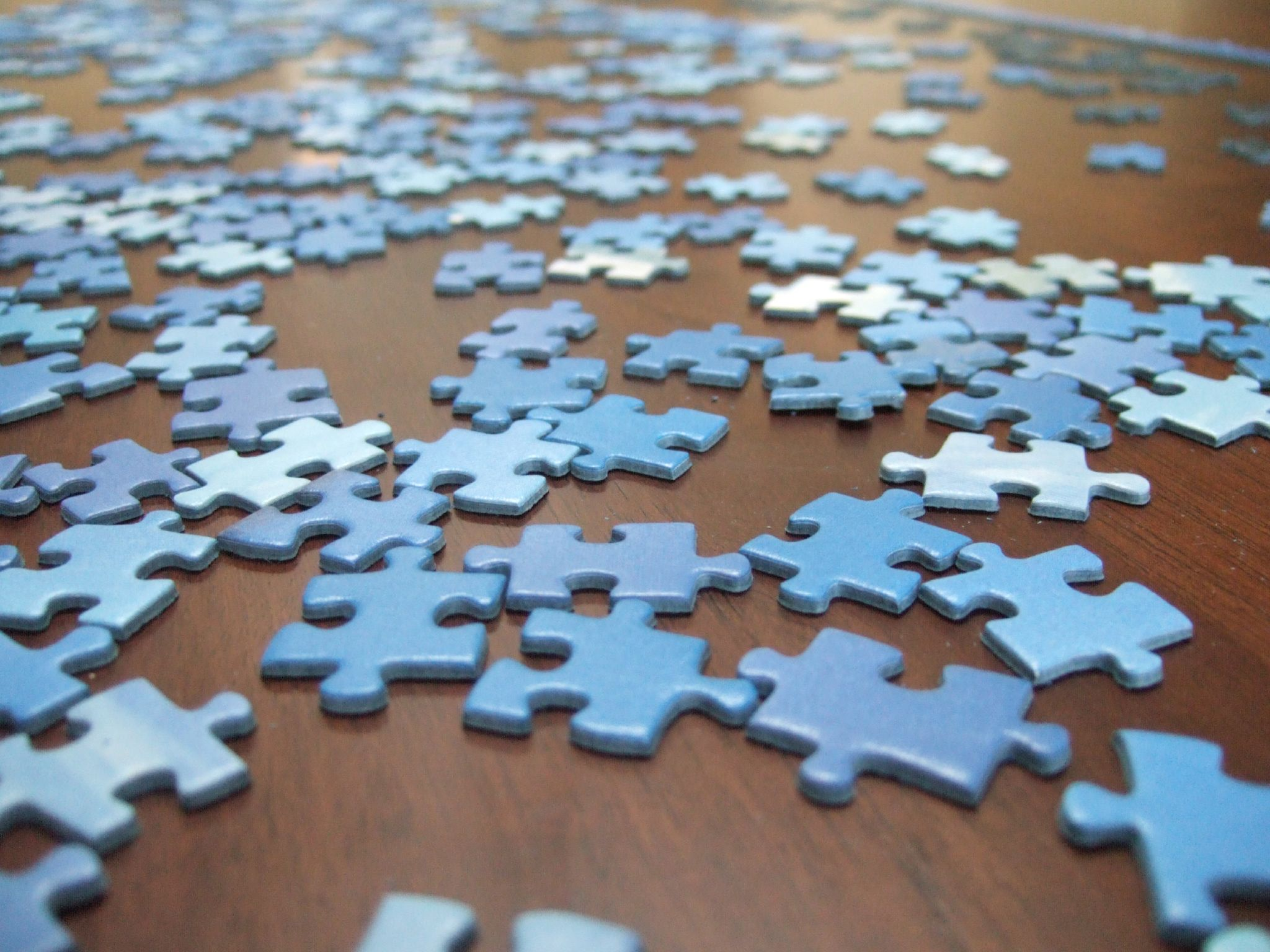
Paperboard jigsaw pieces

Most modern jigsaw puzzles are made of paperboard as they are easier and cheaper to mass-produce. An enlarged photograph or printed reproduction of a painting or other two-dimensional artwork is glued to cardboard, which is then fed into a press. The press forces a set of hardened steel blades of the desired pattern, called a puzzle die, through the board until fully cut.

The puzzle die is a flat board, often made from plywood, with slots cut or burned in the same shape as the knives that are used. The knives are set into the slots and covered in a compressible material, typically foam rubber, which ejects the cut puzzle pieces.

The cutting process is similar to making shaped cookies with a cookie cutter. However, the forces involved are tremendously greater.

Beginning in the 1930s, jigsaw puzzles were cut using large hydraulic presses that now cost hundreds of thousands of dollars. The precise cuts gave a snug fit, but the cost limited jigsaw puzzle production to large corporations. Recent roller-press methods achieve the same results at a lower cost.

New technology has also enabled laser-cutting of wooden or acrylic jigsaw puzzles. The advantage is that the puzzle can be custom-cut to any size or shape, with any number or average size of pieces. Many museums have laser-cut acrylic puzzles made of some of their art so visiting children can assemble puzzles of the images on display. Acrylic pieces are very durable, waterproof, and can withstand continued use without the image degrading. Also, because the print and cut patterns are computer-based, missing pieces can easily be remade.

By the early 1960s, Tower Press was the world's largest jigsaw puzzle maker; it was acquired by Waddingtons in 1969. Numerous smaller-scale puzzle makers work in artisanal styles, handcrafting and handcutting their creations.

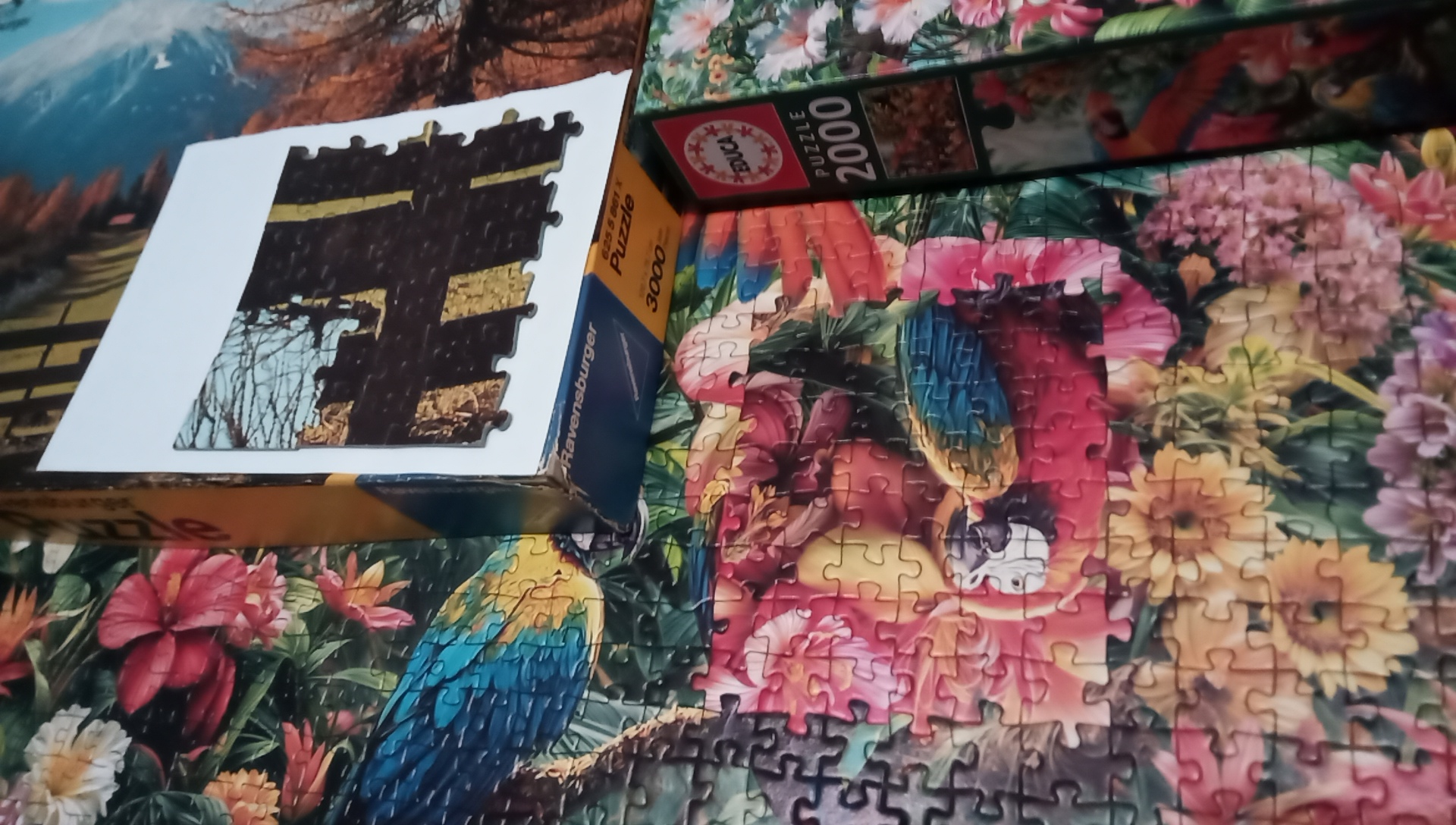
Interchangeable pieces within each of these jigsaw puzzles because their cutting patterns have 180 degree rotation symmetry.

== Variations ==
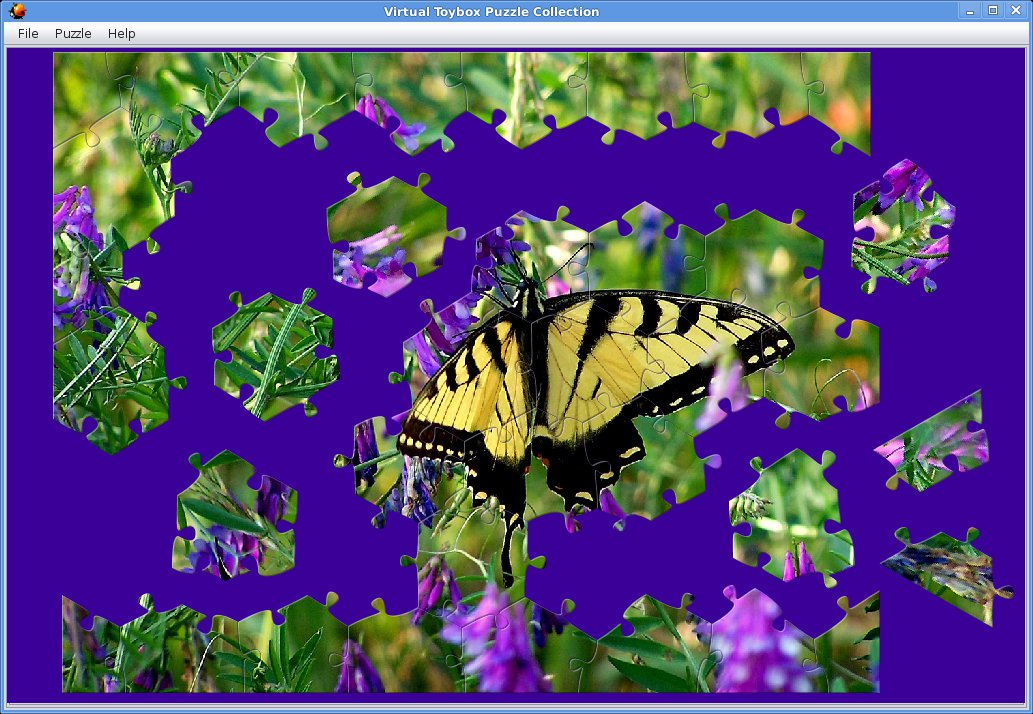
Jigsaw puzzle software allowing rotation of pieces

Jigsaw puzzles come in a variety of sizes. Among those marketed to adults, 300-, 500- and 750-piece puzzles are considered "smaller". More sophisticated, but still common, puzzles come in sizes of 1000, 1500, 2000, 3000, 4000 and 5000 pieces.

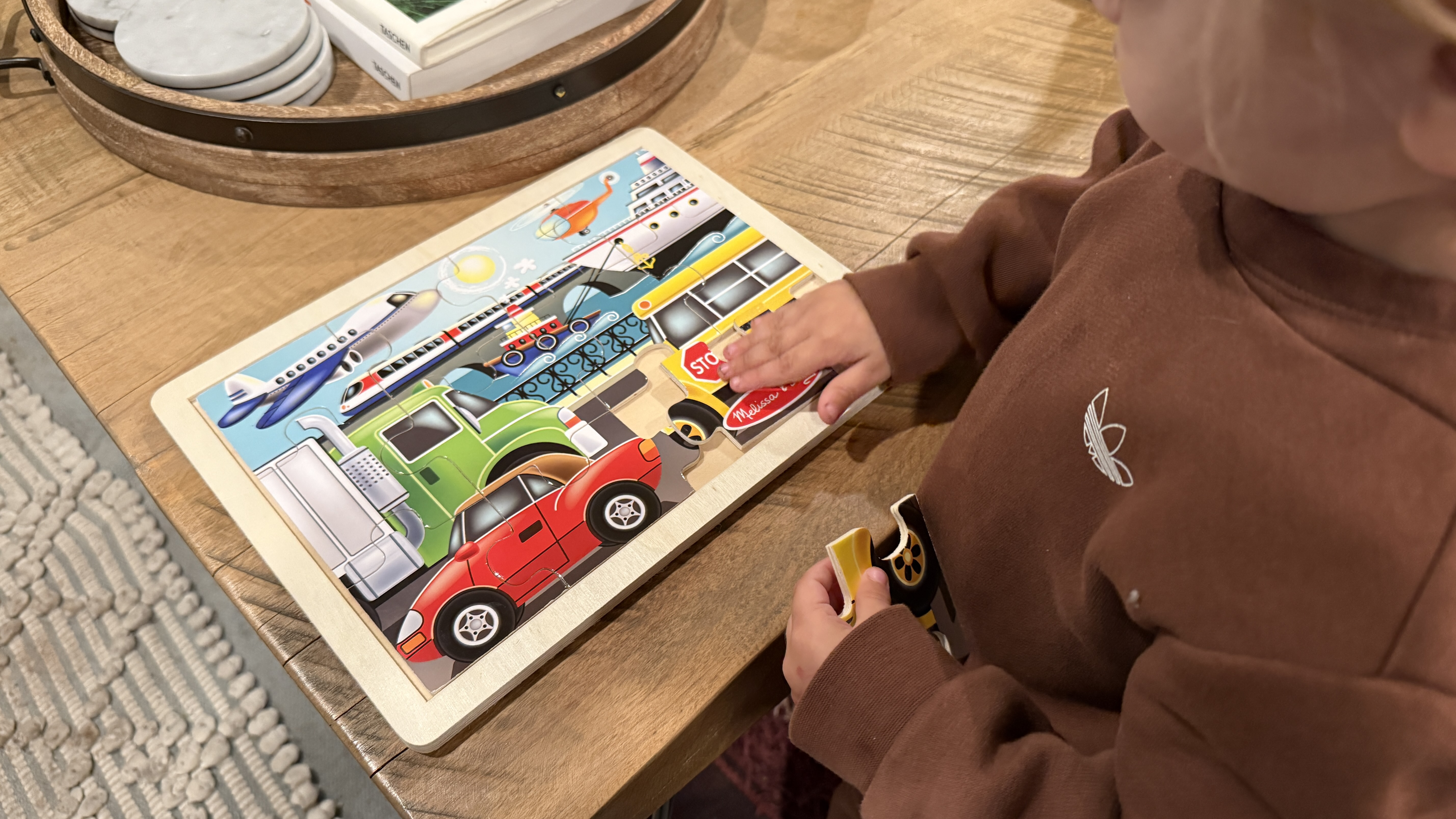
Child solving wooden puzzle

Jigsaw puzzles geared towards children typically have significantly fewer pieces and are typically much larger. For very young children, puzzles with as few as 4 to 9 large pieces (so as not to be a choking hazard) are standard. They are usually made of wood or plastic for durability and can be cleaned without damage.

The most common layout for a thousand-piece puzzle is 38 pieces by 27 pieces, for an actual total of 1,026 pieces. Most 500-piece puzzles are 27 pieces by 19 pieces, for a total of 513 pieces. A few puzzles are double-sided so they can be solved from either side—adding complexity, as the enthusiast must determine if they are looking at the right side of each piece.

"Family puzzles" of 100–550 pieces use an assortment of small, medium and large pieces, with each size going in one direction or towards the middle of the puzzle. This allows a family of different skill levels and hand sizes to work on the puzzle together. Companies like Springbok, Cobble Hill, Ceaco, Buffalo Games and Suns Out make this type of specialty puzzle. Ravensburger, on the other hand, formerly made this type of puzzle from 2000 until 2008.

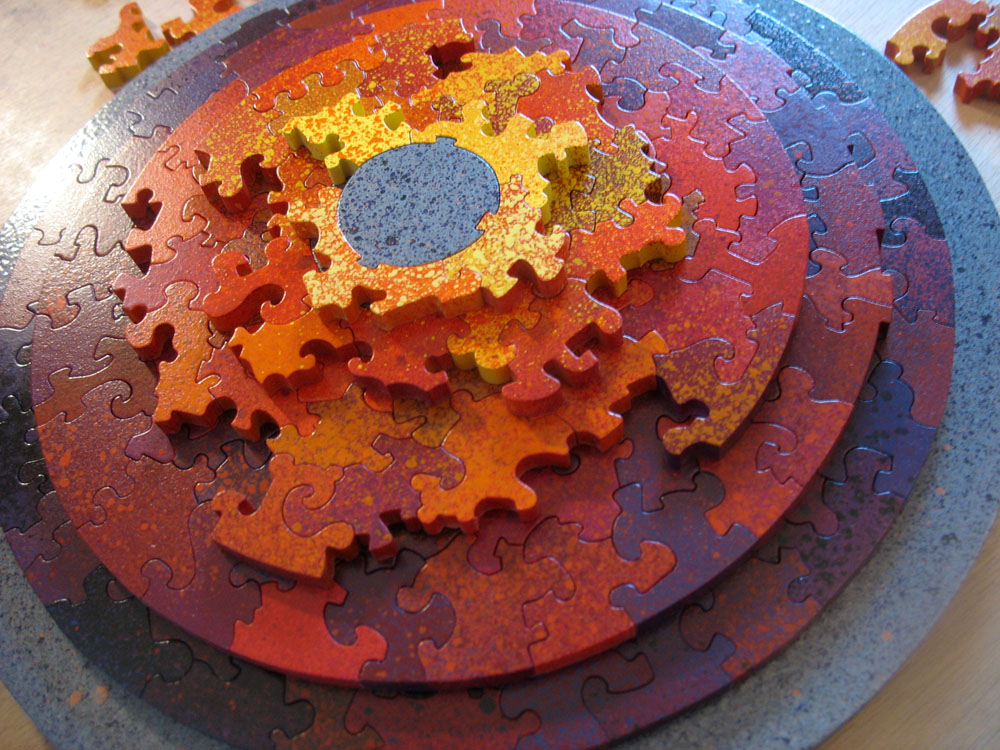
A three-dimensional puzzle composed of several two-dimensional puzzles stacked on top of one another

There are also three-dimensional jigsaw puzzles. Many are made of wood or styrofoam and require the puzzle to be solved in a particular order, as some pieces will not fit if others are already in place. One type of 3-D jigsaw puzzle is a puzzle globe, often made of plastic. Like 2-D puzzles, the assembled pieces form a single layer, but the final form is three-dimensional. Most globe puzzles have designs representing spherical shapes such as the Earth, the Moon, and historical globes of the Earth.

Puzzles from the Magic Puzzle Company include a shifting effect that allows the puzzle to be rearranged to form a new image while revealing extra space to be filled by a separate set of included pieces.

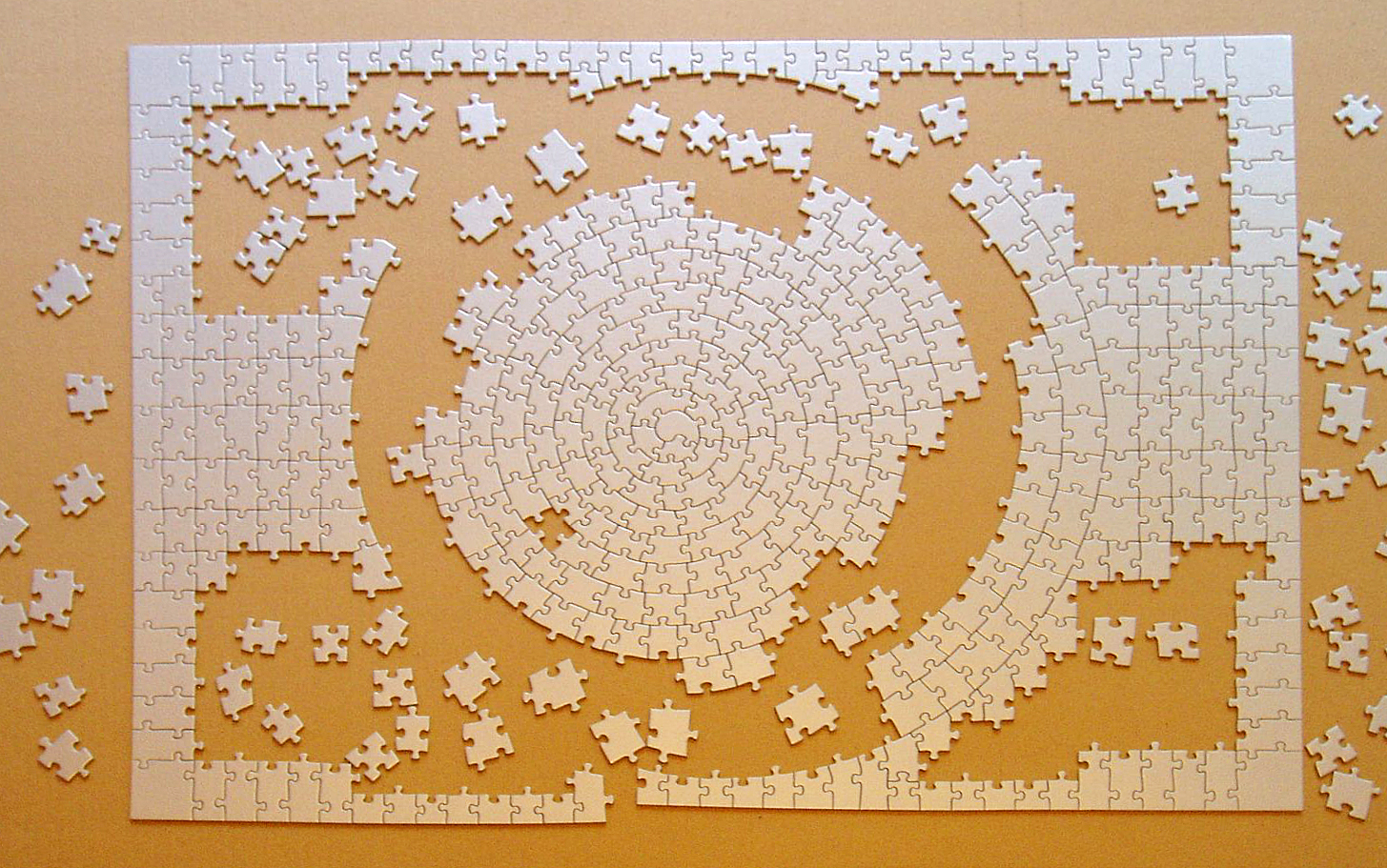
A puzzle without a picture

Jigsaw puzzles can vary significantly in price depending on their complexity, number of pieces, and brand. In the US, children's puzzles can start around $5, while larger ones can be closer to $50. The most expensive puzzle to date was sold for $US27,000 in 2005 at a charity auction for The Golden Retriever Foundation.

== Puzzle pieces ==
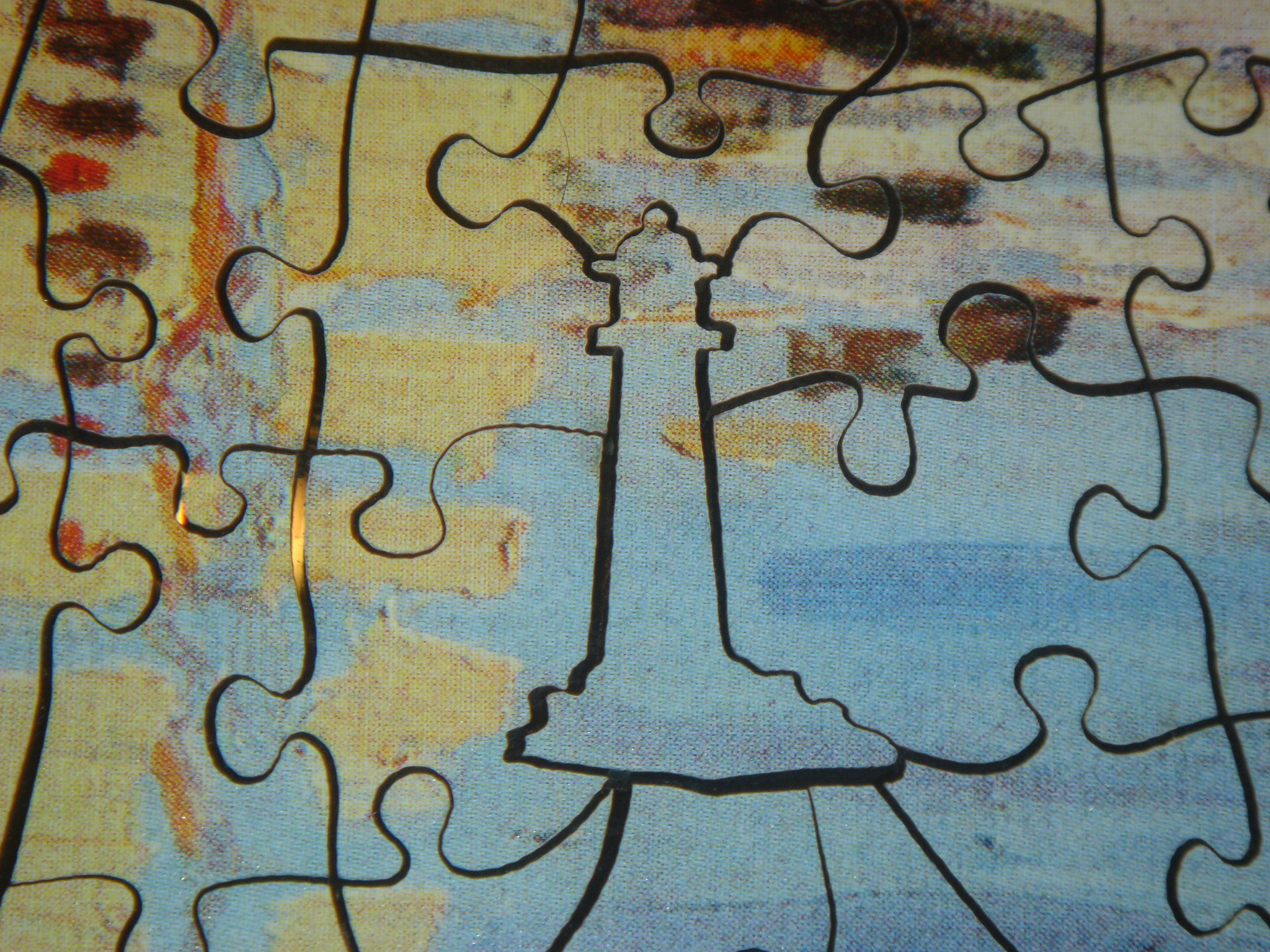
A "whimsy" piece in a wooden jigsaw puzzle

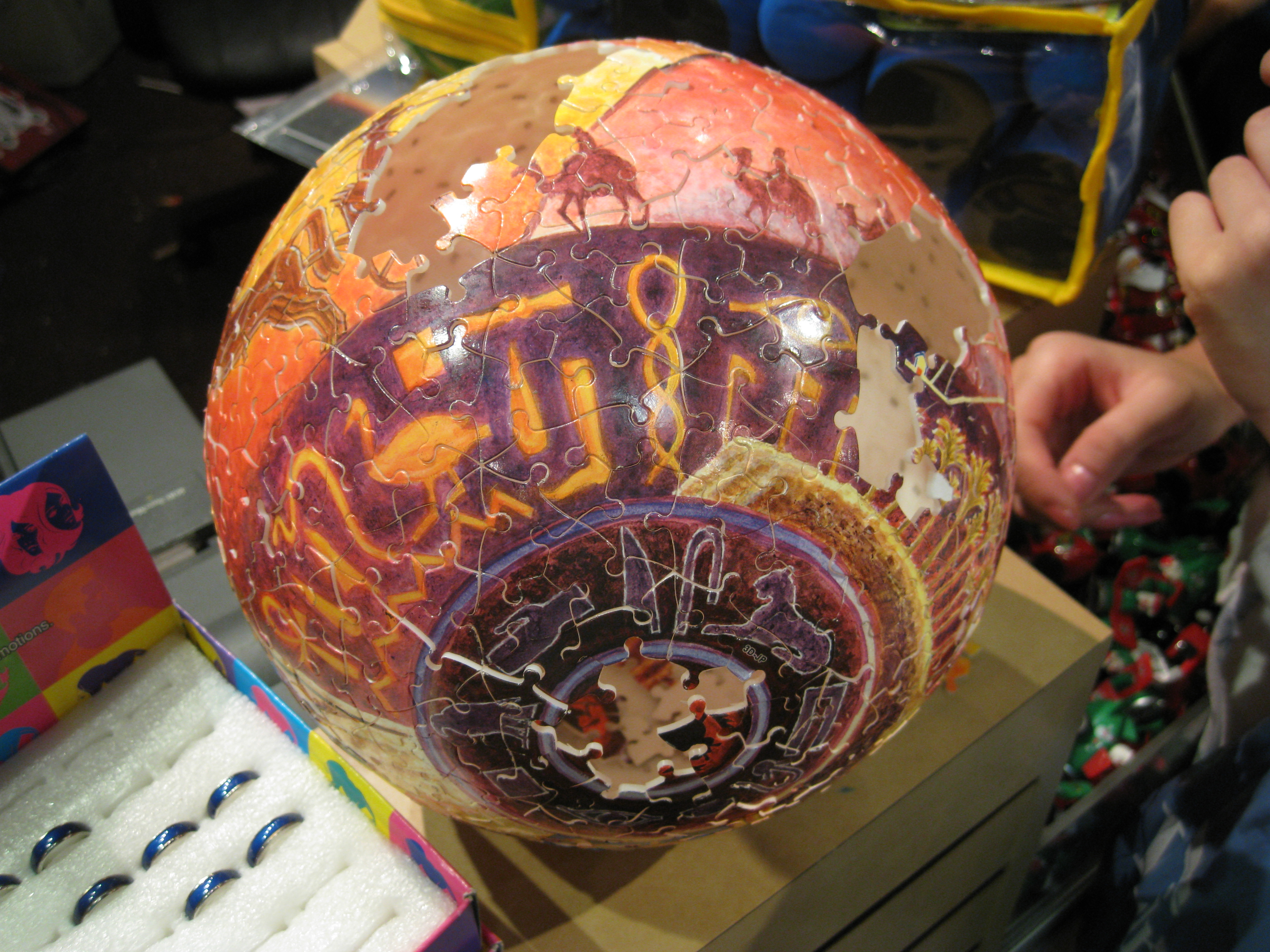
A 3D jigsaw puzzle

Most puzzles are square or rectangular, with edge pieces with one straight side, and four corner pieces. However, some puzzles have edge and corner pieces cut like the rest, with no straight sides, making them more challenging to identify. Some puzzles are round or in a more complex shape, such as profiles of animals, and their edge pieces are therefore curved. Spherical puzzles can have triangular edge pieces.

Otherwise, all or most pieces of a modern jigsaw puzzle interlock by means of rounded tabs (interjambs) and indentations (called "blanks") on adjacent sides. The pieces are normally four-sided and may be uniform in appearance except for the edges and corners. Some puzzles are termed "fully interlocking", which means that a group of assembled pieces fit together tightly enough to be moved without falling apart; sometimes the connection is tight enough that a solved section will remain attached when lifted by one piece. Uniformly shaped fully interlocking puzzles, sometimes called "Japanese Style", are more difficult because pieces are hard to tell apart.

Wooden puzzles fit together more loosely, with few tabs and blanks, because of the limits of the material and the cutting technology. They sometimes include pieces in recognisable shapes such as objects or animals, known as "whimsies", "silhouettes", or "figurals". Designer Yuu Asaka has created monochrome jigsaw puzzles with five "corner" pieces (with two straight edges) and consisting entirely of such pieces. The former was awarded the Jury Honorable Mention at the 2018 Puzzle Design Competition.

== World records ==
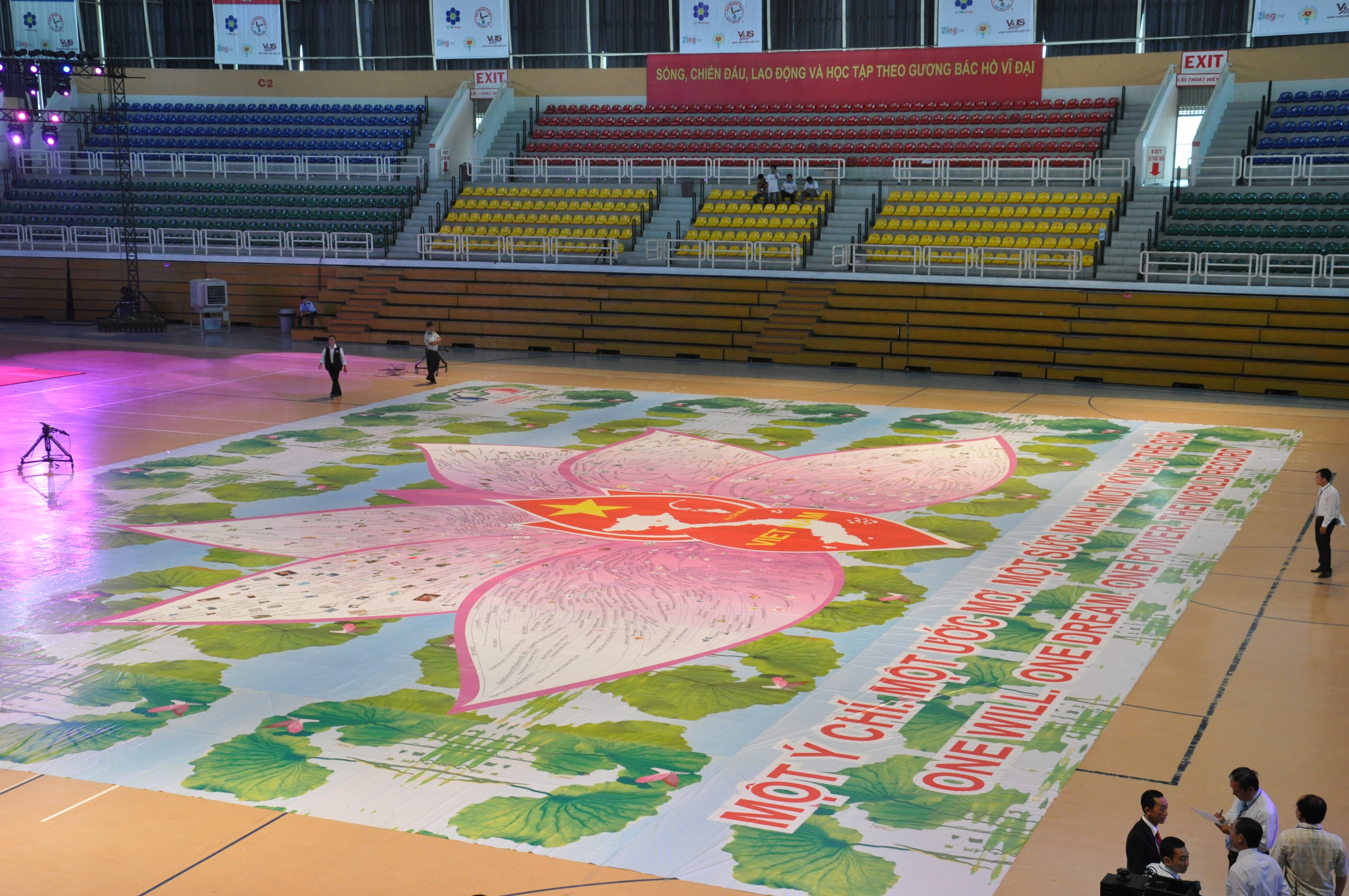
The floor layout for the planned Guinness record of CYM Group in 2011 with 551,232 pieces

The world's largest-sized jigsaw puzzle measured 6,122.68 m^{2} (65,904.0 sq ft) with 12,320 pieces. It was assembled on 7 July 2018 at Dubai Multi Commodities Centre in United Arab Emirates.

The jigsaw with the greatest number of pieces had 551,232 pieces and measured 14.85 by 23.20 metres (48 ft 9 in × 76 ft 1 in). It was assembled on 25 September 2011 at Phú Thọ Indoor Stadium in Ho Chi Minh City, Vietnam, by students of the University of Economics, Ho Chi Minh City. It is listed by the Guinness World Records for the "Largest Jigsaw Puzzle – most pieces", and was divided into 3,132 sections each containing 176 pieces, which were assembled individually and then connected to compose the full puzzle.

=== Largest commercially available jigsaw puzzles ===
Pieces	Name of puzzle	Company	Year	Size [cm]	Area [m^{2}]
60,000	What A Wonderful World	Dowdle Folk Art	2022	883 × 243	21.46
54,000	Travel around Art	Grafika	2020	864 × 204	17.63
52,110	(No title: collage of animals)	MartinPuzzle	2018	696 × 202	14.06
51,300	27 Wonders from Around the World	Kodak	2019	869 × 191	16.60
48,000	Travel Around the World	Grafika	2017	768 × 204	15.67
42,000	Around the World	Educa Borras	2017	749 × 157	11.76
40,320	Pokémon Celebration Journey	Ravensburger	2026	680 × 192	13.06
40,320	Making Mickey's Magic	Ravensburger	2018	680 × 192	13.06
40,320	Memorable Disney Moments	Ravensburger	2016	680 × 192	13.06
33,600	Wild Life	Educa Borras	2014	570 × 157	8.95
32,000	New York City Window	Ravensburger	2014	544 × 192	10.45
32,000	Double Retrospect	Ravensburger	2010	544 × 192	10.45
24,000	Life, The greatest puzzle	Educa Borras	2007	428 × 157	6.72

== Research studies ==
In 2021, researchers conducted a study during which a group of children between the ages of 3 and 5 years old were asked to complete three different types of jigsaw puzzles. Each child was given a normal jigsaw puzzle with a picture on it, another with normal shaped pieces but without an image on it and finally a puzzle with an image on it but all the pieces were shaped the same. They were shown the completed versions then asked to reassemble them. The children were given three minutes to complete each puzzle; half of the group was given a guide picture while the other half was not. The results revealed that 4 and 5 year olds were able to complete all three puzzles within the allotted time, meanwhile most 3-year-olds were able to complete the normal jigsaw puzzle and the puzzle of normal shaped pieces without an image on it but struggled more with the puzzle that had an image but all the pieces were shaped the same. With all of the children the fastest completion time was with the normal puzzle and the slowest was with the puzzle with an image and same shaped pieces; there were also fewer errors in with the children that had a guide. The cognitive development between the different ages can be seen in their completion times and how many errors were made. The older children were able to complete the puzzles with fewer errors because their mental rotation abilities, which is the ability to rotate an object in your mind to see it from a different perspective, are further developed than they are for younger children who are more likely to resort to trial and error.

The difference in the visuospatial abilities between boys and girls were studied in 2017 using jigsaw puzzles. A second-grade class was asked to complete three different puzzles, the first was a neutral one of a horse, second was a male-oriented one of a tractor, and the third was a female-oriented one of the character Bambi. The Bambi puzzle had the fastest completion time with all the children which is believed to be caused by their previous experience, and because it was finished the fastest with all of the children researchers do not believe there is a connection between the puzzles' targeted audience and the sex of the children. Overall the girls in the class were faster, and made fewer errors.

== Society ==
The logo of Wikipedia is a globe made out of jigsaw pieces. The incomplete sphere symbolizes the room to add new knowledge.

In the logo of the Colombian Office of the Attorney General, a jigsaw puzzle piece appears in the foreground. They named it "The Key Piece": "The piece of a puzzle is the proper symbol to visually represent the Office of the Attorney General because it includes the concepts of search, solution and answers that the entity pursues through the investigative activity."

=== Art and entertainment ===
The central antagonist in the Saw film franchise is nicknamed Jigsaw, due to his practice of cutting the shape of a puzzle piece from the remains of his victims.

In the 1933 Laurel and Hardy short Me and My Pal, several characters attempt to complete a large jigsaw puzzle.

"Lost in Translation" is a 1974 poem about a child putting together a jigsaw puzzle, as well as an interpretive puzzle itself.

Life: A User's Manual (1978), Georges Perec's most famous novel, tells as pieces of a puzzle a story about a jigsaw puzzle maker.

"Jigsaw Puzzle", sometimes spelled "Jig-Saw Puzzle" is a song by the rock and roll band The Rolling Stones, featured on their 1968 album Beggars Banquet; “Jigsaw Falling into Place” is a song by the alternative rock band Radiohead, released in 2007 as part of their album ‘’In Rainbows’’.

In the 1941 film Citizen Kane Susan Alexander Kane (Dorothy Comingore) is reduced to spending her days completing jigsaws after the failure of her operatic career. After Kane's death when "Xanadu" is emptied, hundreds of jigsaw puzzles are discovered in the cellar.

Rhett And Link Do A Rainy Day Jigsaw Puzzle is a short video by self-described "internetainers" (portmanteau of "Internet" and "entertainers") Rhett & Link which portrays the frustration of discovering a puzzle piece is missing.

In 2022, Andorra issued a commemorative 2 euro coin, on the national side of which a figure of puzzle pieces was stamped, symbolising the Principality of Andorra and the countries belonging to the European Union.

According to the Alzheimer Society of Canada, doing jigsaw puzzles is one of many activities that can help keep the brain active and may reduce the risk of Alzheimer's disease.

=== As a symbol for autism ===
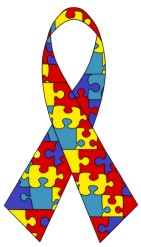
An "autism awareness" ribbon, featuring red, blue, and yellow jigsaw pieces

Jigsaw puzzle pieces were first used as a symbol for autism in 1963 by the United Kingdom's National Autistic Society, wherein a crying child was depicted wiping their eye. The organization chose jigsaw pieces for their logo to represent the "puzzling" nature of autism and the inability to "fit in" due to social differences, and also because jigsaw pieces were recognizable and otherwise unused. Puzzle pieces have since been incorporated into the logos and promotional materials of many organizations, including the Autism Society of America and Autism Speaks.

Proponents of the autism rights movement oppose the jigsaw puzzle iconography, stating that metaphors such as "puzzling" and "incomplete" are harmful to autistic people. Critics of the puzzle piece symbol instead advocate for an infinity symbol representing diversity. In 2017, the journal Autism concluded that the use of the jigsaw puzzle evoked negative public perception towards autistic individuals. They removed the puzzle piece from their cover in February 2018.

== See also ==
- Edge-matching puzzle
- European Jigsaw Puzzle Championships
- Jigsaw puzzle accessories
- Tessellation
