= John Baker Jr. =

John Baker Jr. is the name of:

- John A. Baker Jr. (1927–1994), U.S. diplomat
- John Baker (defensive lineman, born 1935) (1935–2007), American defensive lineman in the National Football League
- John F. Baker Jr. (1945–2012), U.S. Army Master Sergeant and Medal of Honor recipient

== See also ==
- John Baker (disambiguation)
