= Jaime Aparicio Otero =

Bolivian diplomat, lawyer, journalist (born 1955)

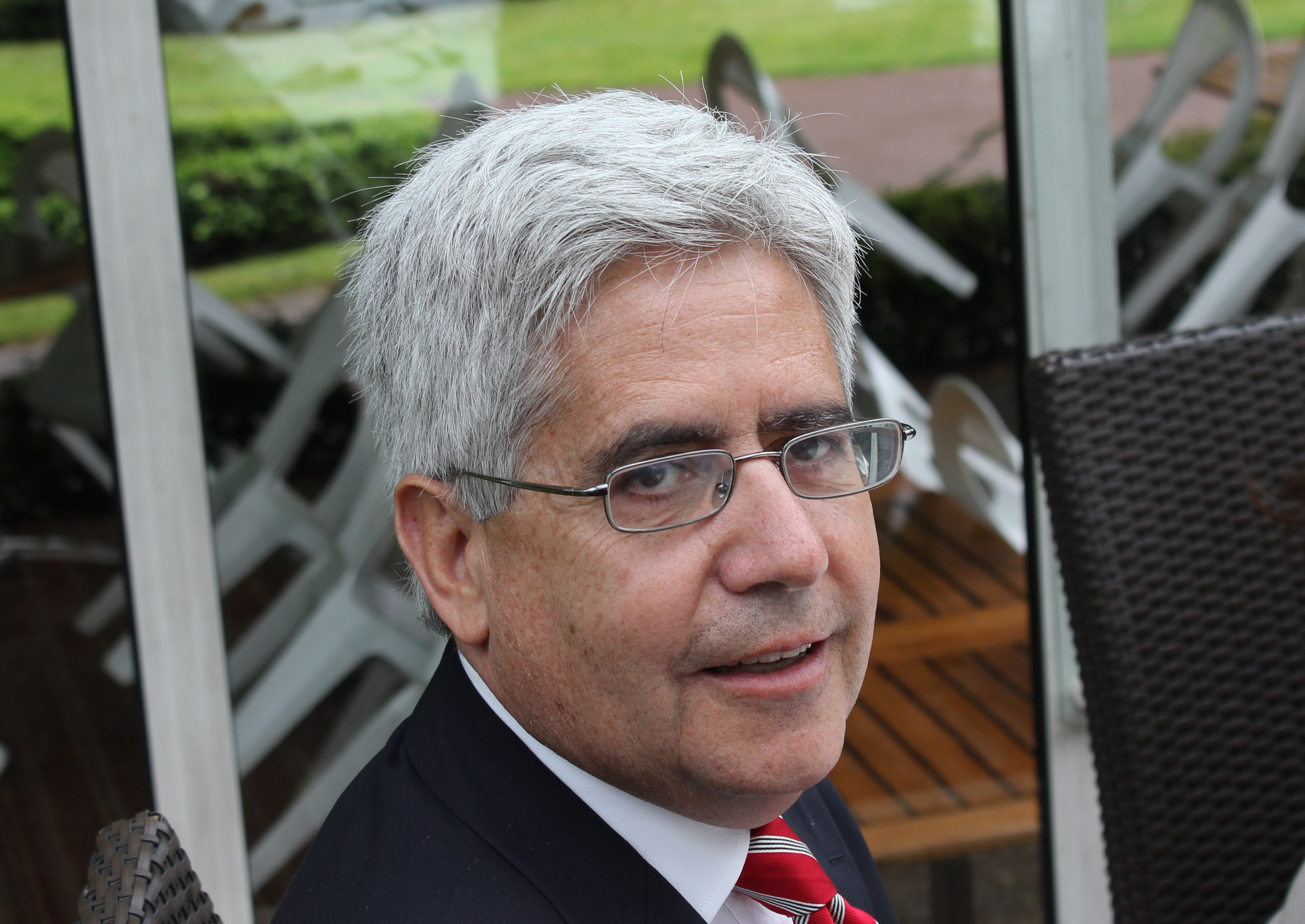
- Aparicio in 2013
- Born: Jaime Aparicio Otero; August 30, 1955 (age 70); La Paz, Bolivia
- Education: Higher University of San Andrés, La Paz, Bolivia; La Sorbonne, Paris, France; Institut d'Études Politiques, Paris, France.
- Occupations: Lawyer, diplomat and political consultant
- Relatives: Maria Otero, Jaime Otero Calderon
- Writing career
- Notable awards: National Order of the Legion of Honour of France; Merit Award of the Government of Canada

Jaime Aparicio Otero (born August 30, 1955) has been the Bolivian Permanent Representative to the Organization of American States (OAS) and was Bolivian Agent to the International Court of Justice, in the Hague, in the process against Chile related to the Silala waters. Ambassador Aparicio is a career diplomat, lawyer, journalist and a Washington-based legal and political advisor. He was also a political analyst working in international public and corporate affairs in Latin America, the Caribbean, North America, and Europe. He has a Law Degree from the Higher University of San Andrés of La Paz, the Bolivian Diplomatic Academy and the Institute d’Etudes Politiques (commonly referred as Sciences Po) in Paris.

With over two decades of personal experience dealing with the United States and with four different US Presidents, Aparicio has championed access to information as a fundamental human right in the continent.

Aparicio has been working in issues related to international law, democracy, human rights, and rule of law in Latin America for more than 30 years. Aparicio's firm, Aparicio, Arp & Associates LLC, has submitted petitions to the Inter-American Commission on Human Rights (IACHR) representing, among others, the Cuban blogger Yoani Sánchez. and the "Ladies in White" Group (Damas de Blanco).

He was the Ambassador of Bolivia to the United States (2002–2006) and was later President of the Inter-American Juridical Committee of the OAS. Previously, he worked at the Organization of American States as Executive Secretary of the Summits of the Americas. Before that, he was Under-Secretary of State for Foreign Affairs and Acting Secretary of State for Foreign Affairs of Bolivia. Aparicio led several missions to the General Assembly of the United Nations, UNESCO and the Organization of American States.

He has also served abroad in Venezuela and France as Bolivia's Permanent Representative to UNESCO in Paris.

In 2019, Aparicio sued President of Nicaragua Daniel Ortega at the Inter-American Commission on Human Rights after Ortega jumped a constitutional ban on presidential re-election with help from a Supreme Court filled with his supporters setting a major precedent for similar unconstitutional re-elections across the continent and more especially of his Bolivian counterpart Evo Morales. Aparicio has become one of the most vocal opponents to dictatorships across Latin America, especially in Cuba, Bolivia, Venezuela and Nicaragua.

== Personal life and family background ==
Aparicio was born in La Paz on August 30, 1955. He is the son of Elisa Otero Calderón and Enrique Aparicio Chopitea. His father Enrique, born in Sucre, Bolivia, was a Ph.D graduate from Columbia University (Public Health), and a Professor and Dean at the Faculty of Medicine of the Higher University of San Andrés (Universidad Mayor de San Andrés). His mother Elisa was the sister of Jaime Otero Calderon, an intellectual and very influential congressman and journalist. Aparicio's cousin Maria Otero was the first holder of the office of the Under Secretary of State for Civilian Security, Democracy, and Human Rights under President Barack Obama's administration. Maria is also the highest-ranking Latina in the State Department's history.

Aparicio studied law at Higher University of San Andrés (Universidad Mayor de San Andrés) in La Paz, Bolivia; he also graduated from the Bolivian Diplomatic Academy. He then studied Universal Jurisdiction at the Sorbonne University and Political Science at the Institut d'Études Politiques in Paris and International Relations at the Fondazione Di Ricerche E Studi Internazionali, Farnesina (Italian Foreign Office) in Florence, Italy.

Aparicio is divorced and has three children.

== Recent work and legal career ==
Aparicio has been working in issues related to international law, democracy, human rights, and rule of law in Latin America for more than 25 years. Aparicio created Aparicio, Arp & Associates LLC a consulting group based in Washington, D.C., specialized in international litigation, mediation, and arbitration on international public and private law. He also practices international litigation on cases of violation of individual freedoms, political rights, private property, freedom of expression, and abuse of power in cases like TIPNIS in Bolivia; submitting cases to the Inter-American Commission on Human Rights representing, among others, the Cuban blogger, Yoani Sánchez, Marta Beatriz Roque from the "Ladies in White" Group (Damas de Blanco); or representing the former presidential candidate, Fabio Gadea, from Nicaragua, against the unconstitutional reelection of Daniel Ortega.

Aparicio has published widely on foreign policy, promotion of democracy, populism, and the application of the Inter-American Democratic Charter (IADC) and participates regularly as political analyst in CNN, NTN24 and other TV programs and media in issues related to foreign policy and Latin America. Aparicio's articles and analysis are widely published by the most prestigious newspapers such as El País from Spain, Clarin, El Universal, The Huffington Post, Economist Latin American Advisor (The Dialogue), the Brookings Institution and Página Siete among others.

Ambassador Aparicio has been invited to speak at the Universities of Harvard, Yale, Columbia, Wharton, Texas, Brigham Young, San Diego in California, SAIS at Johns Hopkins, American University, Kellogg School of Management at Northwestern University, and Georgetown, among others. Jaime is widely considered as the most experienced analyst regarding Latin-American politics nowadays. He is also a regular commentator for the Latin American Advisor, a daily current affairs publication of the Inter-American Dialogue in Washington, D.C.

In 2019, Aparicio sued President of Nicaragua Daniel Ortega at the Inter-American Commission on Human Rights (IACHR) after Ortega jumped a constitutional ban on presidential re-election with help from a Supreme Court filled with his supporters setting a major precedent for similar unconstitutional re-elections across the continent and more especially of his Bolivian counterpart Evo Morales.

Aparicio has become one of the biggest opponents to the new Constitution of Cuba and is supportive of the position taken by Luis Almagro and the Grupo de Lima.

== Public service ==
From 2002 to 2006, Jaime Aparicio was the Ambassador of Bolivia to the United States. He represented Bolivian interests in the United States, during critical times, maintaining relations between both countries at its highest standards. During his tenure, Bolivia was included in the Millennium Challenge Account and admitted as observer to the free trade agreement negotiations between the Andean States and the United States. Ambassador Aparicio participated in complex discussions and tactical negotiations with U.S. Department of State; U.S. Congress; US Trade Representative; U.S. Department of Commerce; International Monetary Fund; World Bank and Inter-American Development Bank, setting goals for cooperation and financial relations with Bolivia.

From August 1993 to April 1997, he was Under-Secretary of State for Foreign Affairs and Acting Secretary of State for Foreign Affairs of Bolivia. Ambassador Aparicio coordinated the Summit of the Americas on Sustainable Development, and the Latin-America and European Union Summit, held in Bolivia in 1996. He led several missions to the General Assembly of the United Nations, UNESCO and the Organization of American States.

In 1994, Aparicio, as Bolivia's deputy Minister of Foreign Affairs, organized the Summit of the Americas, a true milestone for democracies in the continent. For the very first time all states in the Americas from Alaska to Tierra del Fuego, with the exception of Cuba, were democracies. President Bill Clinton invited all democratic leaders of the Americas in a hemispheric initiative aimed at rebuilding the inter-American system in a new scenario defined by the end of the Cold War. 34 democratic heads of state and government discussed ways to commit themselves to the collective defense of democracy and free-market economies. The shared strategy in these negotiations was to build a new hemispheric architecture based on representative democracy, free markets and social development. The new regional agenda, unanimously approved by the presidents and prime ministers of the Americas, marked an exceptional moment for U.S. foreign policy. The U.S.

He has also served abroad in Venezuela and France as Bolivia's Permanent Representative to UNESCO in Paris.

== Private activities ==
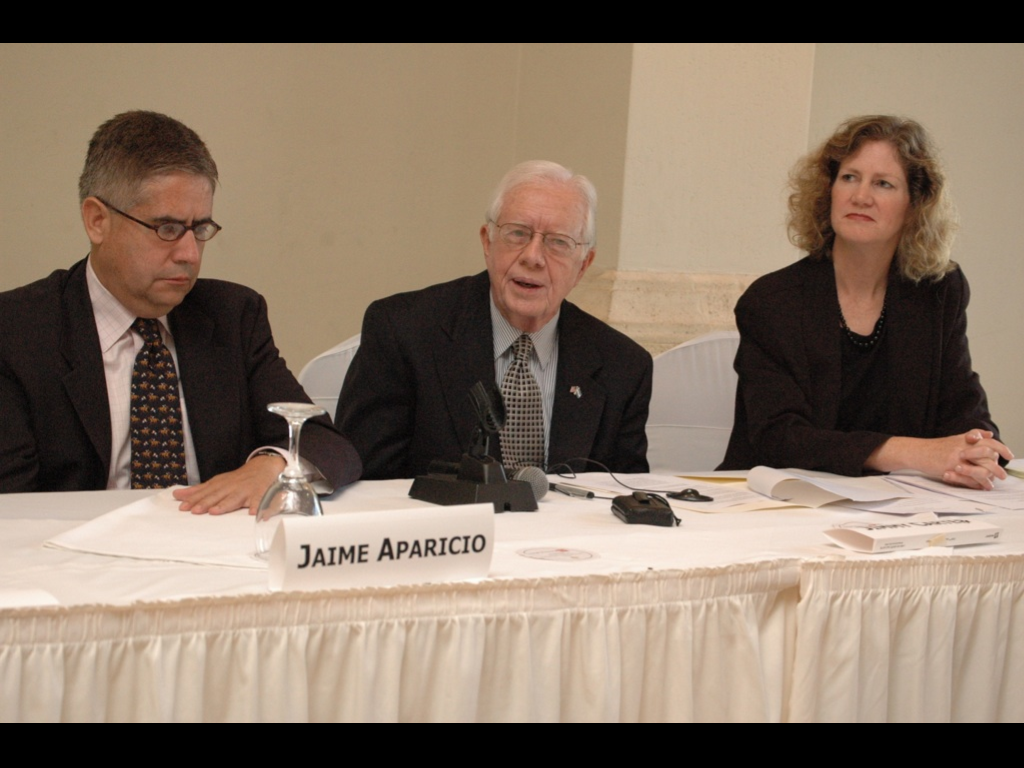
Ambassador Aparicio with Jimmy Carter

Previously, Aparicio Otero has been an envoy on special missions for the Carter Center in issues related to monitoring elections and political conflict resolution, in Nicaragua, Ecuador, and Costa Rica. He was also a political consultant in Washington, D.C., for Newlink Political, a Miami-based government relations firm.

He was President of the Inter-American Juridical Committee of the OAS, of which he was unanimously elected as a board member, for four years, by the 34 countries of the Organization of American States (OAS). The committee, headquartered in Rio de Janeiro, is an advisory body in juridical matters of an international nature and also advises on juridical problems related to the countries of the Americas. The committee had a leading role in drafting the Inter-American Convention against Corruption (IACAC), the resolution on Essential Elements of Representative Democracy and the Ten Principles of Access to Public Information

From May 1997 to December 2002, he worked at the Organization of American States first as Senior Advisor to the Secretary General and former President of Colombia César Gaviria and later as Executive Secretary of the Summits of the Americas. In that capacity, he coordinated the Summit of the 34 Heads of State of the Americas in Quebec City in 2002. At the OAS, Ambassador Aparicio had first hand experience dealing with political crisis, electoral conflicts, political mediation and threats to democracy throughout Latin America and the Caribbean. In that capacity, he established an institutionalized mechanism for civil society to participate in the Summits of the Americas process. He coordinated the efforts of the Organization to initiate a dialogue with private companies of the Americas to promote Corporate Social Responsibility as a key factor to contribute to sustainable development.

== Aparicio, Arp and Associates LLC ==
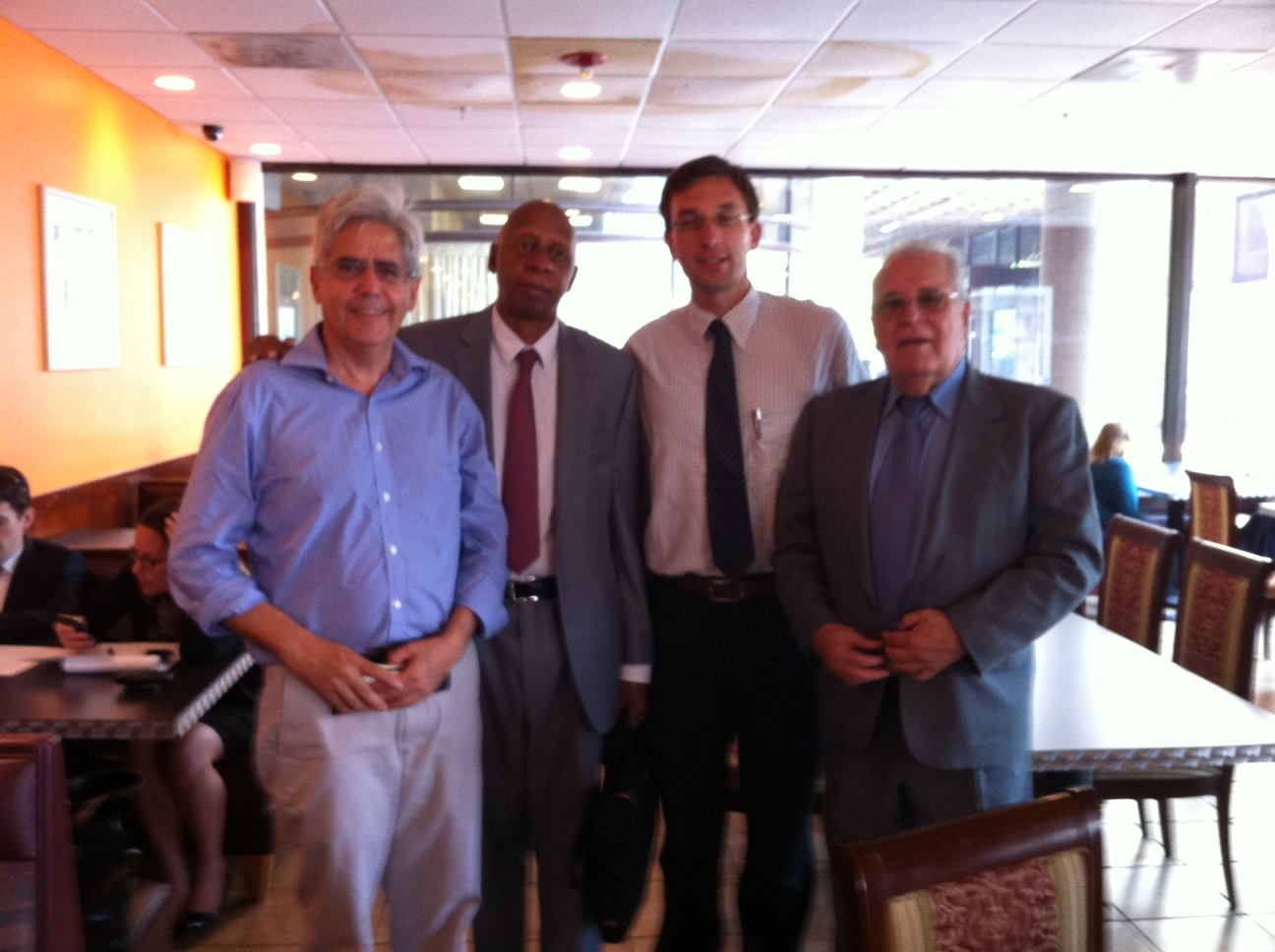
Ambassador Aparicio with Cuban dissidents and human rights activists Guillermo Fariñas and Elizardo Sánchez.

Aparicio created his advisory firm Aparicio, Arp & Associates LLC in 2010 which is specialized in public and private international law.

Aparicio, Arp and Associates LLC represented Maude Versini in her case against Mexico at the Inter-American Commission on Human Rights in Washington, D.C. Maude, a French-Mexican citizen, divorced Arturo Montiel, former Governor of the State of Mexico and moved back to France with their children. In December 2011, the children went to Mexico for a Christmas vacation with their father and never returned to France. For the next 3 years, the mother had no access to her children. On March 6, 2015, the IACHR decided to grant precautionary measures (PM314-13), requesting that Mexico immediately guarantees the children's access to their mother.

== Recognition ==
Ambassador Aparicio has received recognition such as the highest French award, the "Legion D'Honneur" awarded by President Jacques Chirac.

"The 100 Most Invited: A Spotter's guide to the Washingtonian" social scene ranked Ambassador Aparicio as the third most invited man in the USA. President George W. Bush and Vice President Dick Cheney are on top of the list and Senator Barack Obama is number 71.

Ambassador Aparicio is described as "smart, suave and knows how to blend".

== Conferences ==
Interdisciplinary Council on Latin America. American University Understanding Bolivian Crisis. UCSD Bolivian diplomat looks to the future. Morse College

Conferences at Harvard, Yale, Columbia, Wharton, Texas, Brigham Young, San Diego in California, SAIS at Johns Hopkins, American University, Kellogg School of Management at Northwestern University, and Georgetown
