= Rena Golden =

- Born: Rena Shaheen Zeya; March 30, 1961; Bihar, India
- Died: March 20, 2013 (aged 51); New York City, New York
- Known for: Radio and Television Journalist
- Spouse: Rob Golden
- Children: 2

Rena Golden (née Rena Shaheen Zeya; March 30, 1961 – March 20, 2013) was an Indian-born American journalist and news executive who served as senior vice president of CNN International. She also worked for the Weather Channel. In 2013, Golden died after a two-year battle with lymphoma.

== Early and personal life ==
She was married to Rob Golden. The couple has a daughter, Sabrina, and a son, Adam. Her sister Uzra Zeya is an American diplomat who serves as Under Secretary of State for Civilian Security, Democracy, and Human Rights in the Biden administration.
