= John Baker =

John Baker or Jon Baker may refer to:

== Military figures ==
- John Baker (American Revolutionary War) (1731–1787), war hero, for whom Baker County, Georgia was named
- John Baker (general) (1936–2007), Australian Chief of the Defence Force
- John Baker (Medal of Honor, 1876) (c. 1855–?), American soldier
- John Baker (RAF officer) (1897–1978), British air marshal
- John Baker (Royal Navy officer) (1660–1716), English naval officer, MP for Weymouth and Melcombe Regis
- John C. Baker (1919–1996), US Army major general
- John Drayton Baker (1915–1942), United States Navy officer
- John F. Baker Jr. (1945–2012), American soldier, Medal of Honor recipient

== Political figures ==
- John Baker (fl. 1388), English Member of Parliament (MP) for Horsham, 1388
- John Baker (died 1406), English MP for Southwark, 1406
- John Baker (fl. 1407), English MP for Lyme Regis, 1407
- John Baker (MP for Lewes); see Lewes
- John Baker (died c.1421), English MP for Helston, 1414
- John Baker (fl. 1421), English MP for Devizes, 1421
- John Baker (died 1544) (by 1503–44), English MP for Radnorshire
- Sir John Baker (1488–1558) (1488–1558), English speaker of the House of Commons
- John Baker (MP for Bedford) (by 1501–1538 or later), English mayor and MP of Bedford
- John Baker (by 1531 – between 1604 and 1606), English MP for Horsham and Bramber
- John Baker (MP for East Grinstead), English MP for East Grinstead in 1648
- John Baker (MP for Canterbury) (c. 1754–1831), British MP for Canterbury
- John Baker (Virginia politician) (1769–1823), United States congressman from Virginia
- John Baker (Australian politician) (1813–1872), briefly the Premier of South Australia
- John I. Baker (1812–1897), American politician from Beverly, Massachusetts
- Sir John Baker (Portsmouth MP) (1828–1909), British MP for Portsmouth
- John Tamatoa Baker (1852–1921), Hawaiian rancher, sheriff and governor
- John Baker (Labour politician) (1867–1939), British Labour MP for Bilston
- John Baker (Wisconsin politician) (1869–?), American politician from Wisconsin
- John Baker (defensive lineman, born 1935) (1935–2007), American professional football player and then sheriff of Wake County, North Carolina
- John Baker (Indiana politician) (1832–1915), United States congressman from Indiana
- John Aaron Baker (1839–1919), American politician in Wisconsin
- John S. Baker (1861–1955), American politician from Washington
- Sir John Baker, 2nd Baronet (1608–1653), English politician
- John A. Baker Jr. (1927–1994), U.S. diplomat
- John Arnold Baker (1925–2016), British judge and politician
- John Baker II (1780–1843), sheriff of Norfolk County, Massachusetts, 1834–1843
- J. Edwin Baker (1899–1963), American politician, a member of the Florida Senate

== Sports figures ==
=== Baseball ===
- John Baker (baseball) (born 1981), American baseball player
- John Franklin Baker or Home Run Baker (1886–1963), American professional baseball player
- Johnnie "Dusty" Baker (born 1949), American baseball manager and former player

=== Gridiron football ===
- John Baker (defensive lineman, born 1935) (1935–2007), professional football player, sheriff of Wake County, North Carolina
- John Baker (defensive lineman, born 1942), American and Canadian football defensive end
- John Baker (punter) (born 1977), American football punter
- Johnny Baker (guard) (1907–1979), American football player and coach
- Johnny Baker (linebacker) (born 1941), American football linebacker and tight end
- Jon Baker (linebacker) (1923–1992), American football linebacker
- Jon Baker (placekicker) (born 1972), American football placekicker

=== Other sports ===
- John Baker (Australian footballer) (1918–1988), Australian rules footballer for North Melbourne
- John Baker (cricketer) (born 1933), former English cricketer
- John Baker (Ghanaian footballer), Ghanaian international footballer in squad that won 1982 African Cup for the fourth time
- John Baker (musher) (born 1962/3), American dogsled racer
- John Baker (runner) (1944–1970), American cross-country runner
- John Baker (runner, born 1949), American middle-distance runner, 1969 All-American for the Maryland Terrapins track and field team
- John Baker (rugby league) (born 1946), Australian rugby league footballer
- John Baker (diver) (born 1951), British diver

== Music ==
- John Baker (Radiophonic musician) (1937–1997), British composer and musician
- John Baker, British musician and member of The Korgis (active since 1978)
- John Bevan Baker (1926–1994), British composer
- John Baker, composer for ToeJam & Earl (1991–1994)
- Jon Baker (producer) (born 1960), British-Jamaican music industry executive
- Jon Baker, musician (active 1989–1991), member of English indie rock band The Charlatans

== Science ==
- John Baker (biologist) (1900–1984), British biologist and anthropologist
- John Baker, Baron Baker (1901–1985), British engineer
- John Gilbert Baker (1834–1920), British botanist
- J. N. L. Baker (John Norman Leonard Baker, 1893–1971), British geographer
- John Holland Baker (1841–1930), New Zealand surveyor and public servant

== Writers ==
- John Baker (legal historian) (born 1944), English legal historian, Downing Professor of the Laws of England, University of Cambridge
- John Roman Baker (born 1944), British playwright and activist

== Religious figures ==
- John Baker (bishop) (1928–2014), Bishop of Salisbury
- John Gilbert Baker (bishop) (1910–1986), bishop of Anglican Diocese of Hong Kong and Macau
- John Baker (priest) (died 1745), English Anglican vice-master of Trinity College, Cambridge

== Others ==
- John Baker (barrister) (1711–1779), English barrister, Solicitor-General of the Leeward Islands (1750–1753) and diarist
- John Baker (artist) (1726–1771), English flower painter
- John Baker (stained glass artist) (1916–2007), British artist, teacher, conservator and author
- John Wynn Baker (died 1775), Irish agricultural economist
- John William Baker (c. 1775–1860), plantation owner in Cuba
- John Baker (entrepreneur) (born 1976), Canadian businessman, founder and president of D2L
- Jon Baker, fictional character in the American TV show CHiPs

== Given name ==
- John Baker White (clerk of court) (1794–1862), American military officer, lawyer, court clerk, and civil servant
- John Baker White (West Virginia politician) (1868–1944), American military officer, lawyer, and politician in West Virginia
- John Baker White (British politician) (1902–1988)

== See also ==
- Jonathan Baker (disambiguation)
- Jack Baker (disambiguation)
