= Under Secretary of State for Democracy and Global Affairs =

United States Under Secretary of State for Democracy and Global Affairs
- Inaugural holder: Tim Wirth
- Formation: 1994
- Final holder: Maria Otero
- Abolished: February 4, 2013
- Superseded by: Under Secretary of State for Civilian Security, Democracy, and Human Rights
- Website: Official website

The under secretary for democracy and global affairs is a former position within the United States Department of State that, according to the department website, "coordinates U.S. foreign relations on a variety of global issues, including democracy, human rights, and labor; environment, oceans, and science; population, refugees, and migration; women's issues; and trafficking in persons." The office was last held by Maria Otero. Other former under secretaries were Timothy Wirth, Frank E. Loy, and Paula Dobriansky.

The State Department Basic Authorities Act of 1956 states the under secretary for democracy and global affairs had the responsibility to coordinate with the under secretary of state for public diplomacy and public affairs and other offices from regional bureaus to promote democracy in nondemocratic countries. The under secretary also advises the secretary of the Department of State of the effects on human rights and democracy on a foreign country on any recommendation requested by another official, or any agency program. The position was created when Section 161(b) of the Foreign Relations Authorization Act for Fiscal Years 1994 and 1995 authorized the appointment of a fifth under secretary of state.

== Change ==
On January 17, 2012, the office of the under secretary for democracy and global affairs (State Department designation G) became the under secretary of state for civilian security, democracy, and human rights (State Department designation).

== List of under secretaries of state for democracy and global affairs, 1994—2012 ==
Name	Assumed office	Left office	President served under
Tim Wirth	May 12, 1994	December 23, 1997	Bill Clinton
Frank E. Loy	October 26, 1998	January 20, 2001	Bill Clinton
Paula Dobriansky	May 1, 2001	January 20, 2009	George W. Bush
Maria Otero	August 10, 2009	February 4, 2013	Barack Obama
