= Bruce W. Piasecki =

American academic and environmentalist

Bruce Piasecki
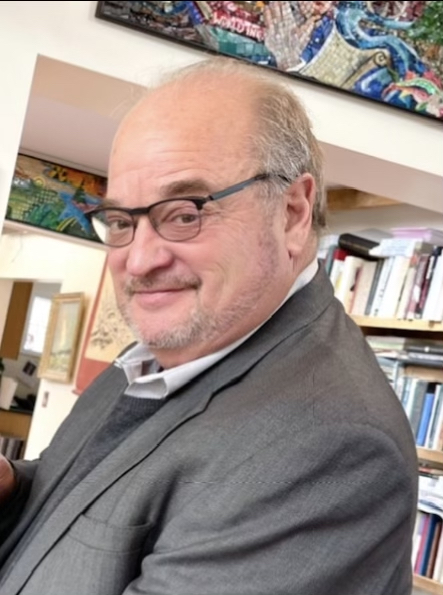
- Born: Bruce W. Piasecki; 1955 (age 70–71); West Islip, Long Island, New York
- Education: Cornell University
- Occupations: Author businessperson
- Spouse: Andrea Masters
- Writing career
- Period: 1987–present
- Genre: Non-fiction
- Website: brucepiasecki.com

Bruce W. Piasecki (born 1955) is an American author, academic, and environmentalist. He is the founder and president of AHC Group.

== Early life and education ==
Bruce Piasecki was born on February 1, 1955, in West Islip, Long Island, New York. He was raised by his widowed mother, Lillian Anna (née Kureczko) Piasecki, who fostered children from diverse racial and ethnic backgrounds.

Piasecki graduated from Cornell University, where he earned a doctorate under literary historian M. H. Abrams.

== Career ==
After completing his doctorate, Piasecki served as an associate professor at Rensselaer Polytechnic Institute, where he directed an environmental management program. He has also taught at Clarkson University and Cornell University. At Clarkson, he taught courses including Great Books in Western Civilization and the biography of Benjamin Franklin for ten years. One of his early articles, "Unfouling the Nest," on managing toxic waste, appeared in the September issue of Science 83, published by the American Association for the Advancement of Science.

In 1981, Piasecki founded AHC Group, Inc. to advise businesses on environmental strategy and public policy.

From 1983 to 1988, with funding awarded by Frank E. Loy of the German Marshall Fund of the United States, Piasecki researched hazardous waste policies and technologies in twelve European countries. This work led to his early books Beyond Dumping (1984) and America's Future in Hazardous Waste Management (1987). In the 1990s, Piasecki served on a White House council formed by Vice President Al Gore.

In 1990 Simon & Schuster published In Search of Environmental Excellence: Moving Beyond Blame, co-authored with Peter Asmus. His 1995 book Corporate Environmental Strategy: The Avalanche of Change since Bhopal was reviewed by Booklist. His 2007 book, World Inc., examines the increasing role of corporations in addressing global challenges and was later published in multiple foreign-language editions. In March 2012, the hardcover edition of Doing More with Less: The New Way to Wealth (Wiley), reached No. 5 spot on the New York Times nonfiction bestseller list. VoiceAmerica interviewer David Gibbons called it "a fine book that weaves its way through the definitions of frugality and historical context as framed by the lives of Benjamin Franklin among others." Another book, New World Companies, was reviewed by Kirkus, which called it "Optimistic and full of good intentions."

In 2021 Piasecki and his wife, Andrea Masters, launched the Creative Force Fund Award for Social Impact Journalists. The award is given to young journalists covering business and society who are under the age of 35. In March 2022, his book A New Way to Wealth: The Power of Doing More with Less was published. In 2023, he published his memoir Doing More With One Life: A Writer's Journey Through the Past, Present, and Future. In 2024, Wealth and Climate Competitiveness: The New Narrative on Business and Society was published.

Piasecki's latest book Stan the Man: Back to Basics is a contemporary narrative set on Long Island, New York. Paris-based podcaster Mia Funk wrote the introduction. Piasecki is a frequent contributor to and podcast guest on Funk's The Creative Process.

In 2024 Worth magazine named Piasecki to its "Worthy 100" list.

PBS is roducing a prime-time special, Doing More with Less, The Ben Franklin Way, centered on Piasecki's life and work. The program is scheduled to air in early 2026.

== Bibliography ==
- 1976: Stray Prayers (poetry collection)
- 1984: Beyond Dumping: New Strategies for Controlling Toxic Contamination (editor)
- 1987: America's Future in Toxic Waste Management: Lessons from Europe (co-edited with Gary A. Davis)
- 1990: In Search of Environmental Excellence: Moving Beyond Blame (with Peter Asmus)
- 1995: Corporate Environmental Strategy: The Avalanche of Change Since Bhopal
- 1998: Environmental Management and Business Strategy: Leadership Skills for the 21st Century (with Kevin A. Fletcher and Frank J. Mendelson)
- 2007: World Inc
- 2009: The Surprising Solution: Creating Possibility in a Swift and Severe World
- 2015: Missing Persons: A Life of Unexpected Influences
- 2016: New World Companies: The Future of Capitalism
- 2016: Doing More With Less: The New Way To Wealth
- 2016: Doing More With Teams: The New Way To Winning
- 2020: The Quiet Genius of Eileen Fisher
- 2021: The Social Intelligence of Linda Coady
- 2021: Giants of Social Investing: John Streur and Jack Robinson
- 2021: Swallowing the Earth Whole: The Lives of Frank Loy and Steve Percy
- 2022: A New Way to Wealth: The Power of Doing More with Less
- 2024: Doing More with One Life: A Writer's Journey Through the Past, Present, and Future (with Jay Parini)
- 2024: Wealth and Climate Competitiveness: The New Narrative on Business and Society
- 2025: Stan the Man: Back to Basics
