= Paula Dobriansky =

American diplomat (born 1955)

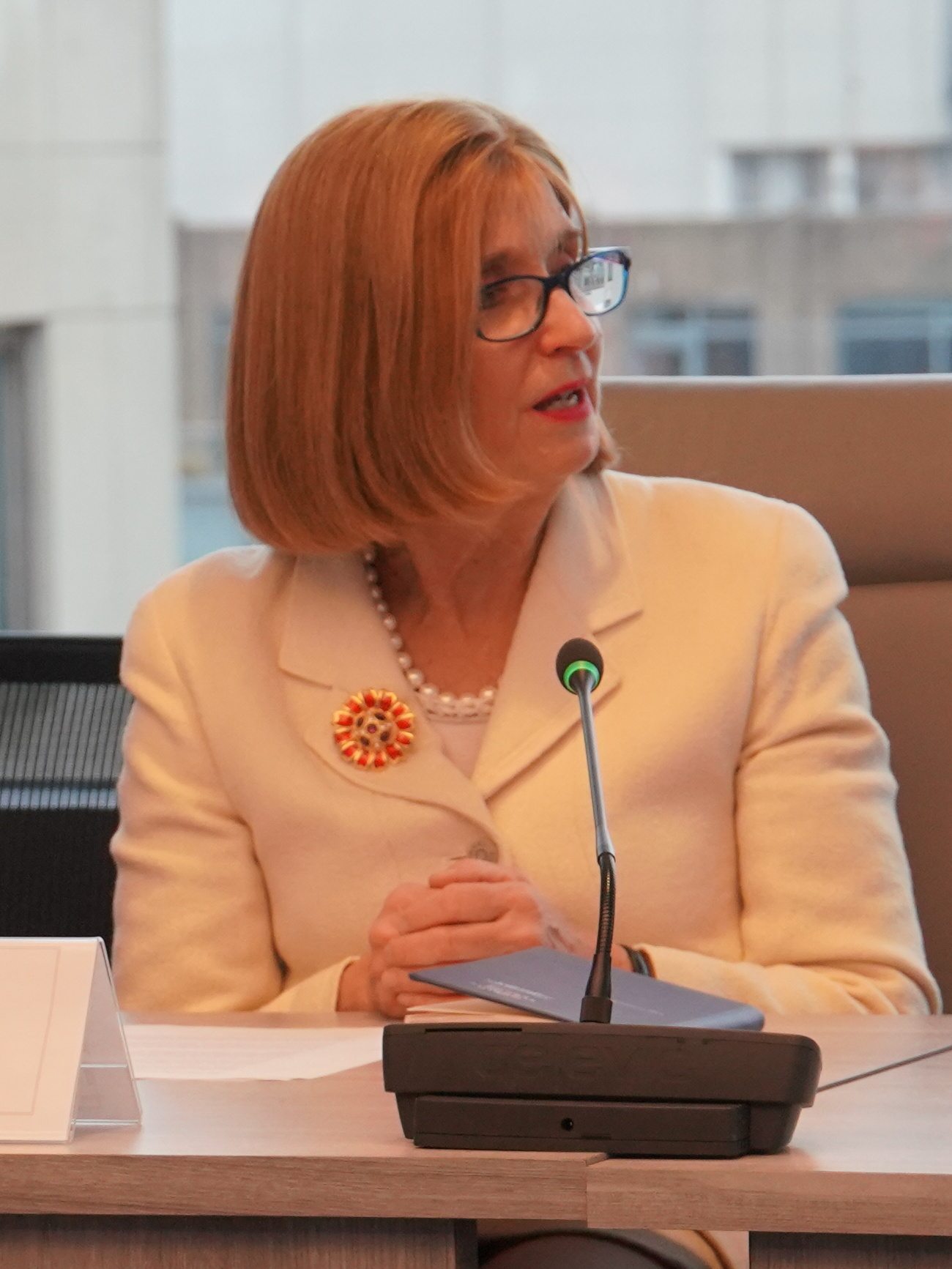
- Dobriansky in 2022

United States Special Envoy for Northern Ireland
- In office February 15, 2007 – January 20, 2009
- President: George W. Bush
- Preceded by: Mitchell Reiss
- Succeeded by: Declan Kelly

Under Secretary of State for Global Affairs
- In office May 1, 2001 – January 20, 2009
- President: George W. Bush
- Preceded by: Frank E. Loy
- Succeeded by: Maria Otero

Personal details
- Born: September 14, 1955 (age 71) Alexandria, Virginia, U.S.
- Party: Republican
- Education: Georgetown University (BS); Harvard University (MA, PhD)

Paula Jon Dobriansky (born September 14, 1955) is an American diplomat, public official, and foreign policy expert who served as Under Secretary of State for Global Affairs (2001–2009) and the President's Envoy to Northern Ireland (2007–2009). A specialist in Central/East European affairs and the former Soviet Union, trans-Atlantic relations, and political-military affairs, Dobriansky held key senior roles in the administrations of five U.S. presidents.

Since 2009, she has been a Senior Fellow at Harvard University's JFK Belfer Center for Science and International Affairs and was named in 2018 the Vice Chair of the Scowcroft Center for Strategy and Security, the Atlantic Council.

== Early life and education ==
Dobriansky graduated summa cum laude from Georgetown University's School of Foreign Service and earned her master's and doctoral degrees from Harvard University in political-military affairs. She is a Fulbright-Hays scholar, a former Rotary and Ford Foundation Fellow, and a member of Phi Beta Kappa.

Her Ukrainian-American father, Dr. Lev Dobriansky, was a professor of economics and prominent anti-communist activist who initiated the Captive Nations Week during the Eisenhower administration.

== Career ==
=== Government service ===
Over more than 30 years, Dobriansky has served in high-level, Senate-confirmed, government positions. She worked at the National Security Council, the White House (1980–1987) on U.S. policy toward all East European countries and contributed to the crafting of U.S. policy toward the Soviet Union. As Director of European and Soviet Affairs in the Reagan administration, she played a key role in the formulation of U.S. political and economic policies toward Poland, matters regarding the Conference on Security and Co-operation in Europe and Soviet human rights issues.

From 1987 to 1990, Dobriansky was appointed Deputy Assistant Secretary of State for Human Rights and Humanitarian Affairs and served in that capacity in both the Reagan and George H.W. Bush administrations. In 1990, she was named Deputy Head of the U.S. Delegation to the 1990 Copenhagen Conference on Security and Cooperation in Europe. That same year, she was appointed associate director (Assistant Secretary rank) of the Bureau of Policy and Programs at the United States Information Agency (USIA). And, in 1997, former President Bill Clinton appointed her to serve as a Republican commissioner on the U.S. Advisory Commission on Public Diplomacy (1997–2001), a Senate-confirmed commission.

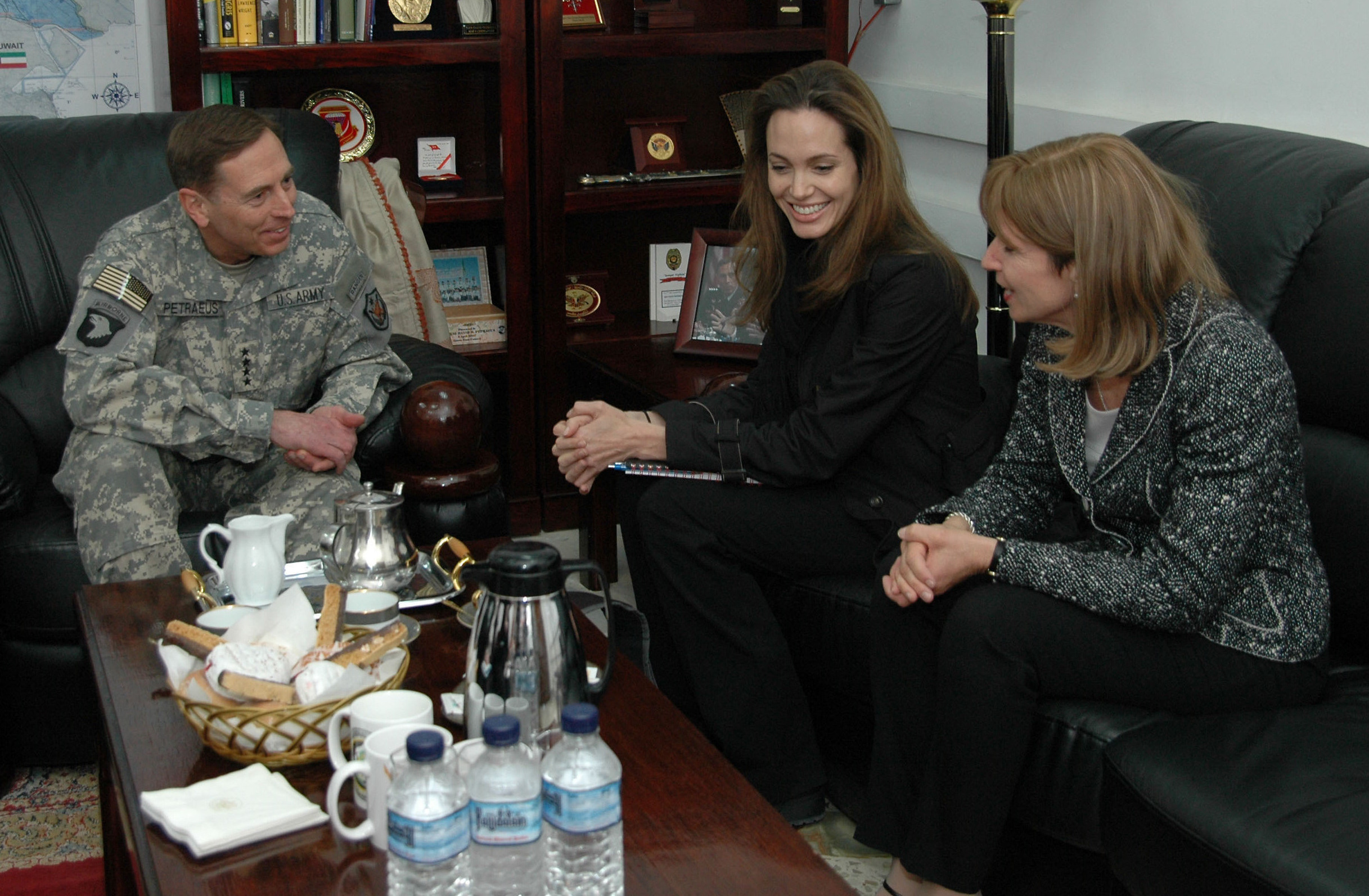
General David Petraeus, Angelina Jolie, and Dobriansky in Baghdad in 2008

In 2001, President George W. Bush nominated Dobriansky as Under Secretary of State for Global Affairs, a position for which she was unanimously confirmed by the U.S. Senate. In that position (2001–2009), she presided over a wide range of areas including human rights, international narcotics and law enforcement, refugees, oceans, environment, science, health, international women's issues and was the head of delegation and lead negotiator on U.S. climate change policy. She is credited with having established and led the U.S.-India, U.S.-China, and U.S.-Brazil Global Issues Fora. She was also a staunch advocate of public-private partnerships and was a Founder of the U.S. Afghan Women's Council. In 2007, while serving as Under Secretary, she became the President's Envoy on Northern Ireland, for which she received the Secretary of State's highest honor, the Distinguished Service Medal, for her contribution to the historic devolution of power in Belfast.

On April 25, 2018, it was reported by U.S. media that President Donald Trump intended to nominate her for the position of Under Secretary of State for Political Affairs, though it was never announced and David Hale was eventually confirmed.

=== Business and academia ===
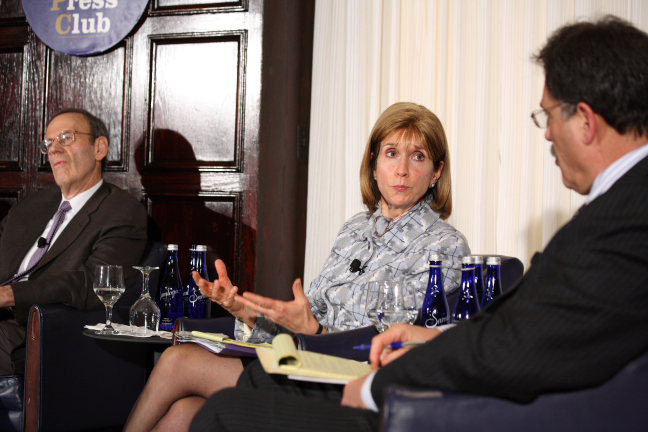
Dobriansky at the Miller Center Reagan Centennial Conference in 2011

After leaving government service in 2009, Dobriansky became a Senior Fellow at Harvard University's John F. Kennedy School of Government's Belfer Center for Science and International Affairs and later became part of the center's "Future of Diplomacy" Project.

In January 2010, Dobriansky was appointed Distinguished National Security Chair at the U.S. Naval Academy, where she taught senior level foreign policy courses for three years. During this period, she was also a senior advisor at the Bipartisan Policy Center and was co-chair of the center's Commission on Stabilizing Fragile States. And from 2010 to 2012, Dobriansky was Senior Vice President and Global Head of Government and Regulatory Affairs at Thomson Reuters, responsible for designing and implementing a corporate approach for engagement in Washington DC and key capitals around the globe.

Earlier from 1997 to 2001, Dobriansky served as Senior Vice President and Director of the Washington Office of the Council on Foreign Relations and was the first George F. Kennan Senior Fellow for Russian and Eurasian Studies.

== Board memberships ==
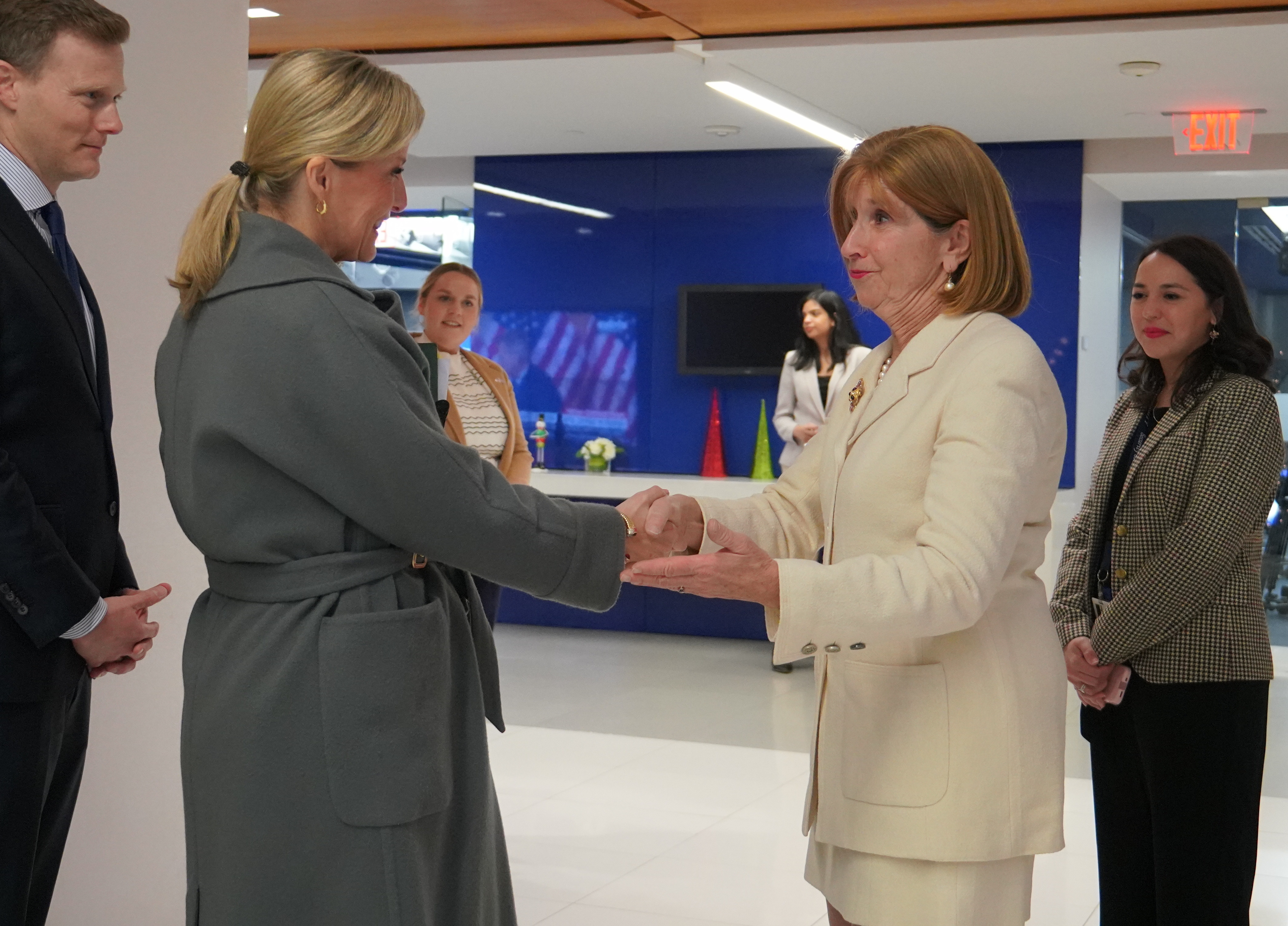
Dobriansky and Sophie, Duchess of Edinburgh in 2022

Dobriansky is a trustee of the Victims of Communism Memorial Foundation, a non-profit organisation which Lev Dobriansky had helped establish.

A member of the Council on Foreign Relations and the American Academy of Diplomacy (including board of directors), Dobriansky serves on the Defense Policy Board, the Secretary of State's Foreign Affairs Policy Board, and the EXIM Advisory Committee, serving as chair of the Subcommittee on Strategic Competition with China.

Dobriansky also serves as vice chair of the U.S. Water Partnership (USWP), is on Concordia's Leadership Council, the Atlantic Council's board of directors, and Georgetown University's School of Foreign Service advisory board. She is on the IDS International advisory board, providing the company with guidance on strategy and operations. She is on the board of advisors of the China Center at Hudson Institute. From 2011 to 2015, she served as chair of the national board of directors of the World Affairs Councils of America.

Since 2022, Ambassador Paula Dobriansky has been a member of the ACE Global Leaders of Excellence Network.,

Diplomatic posts
Preceded by Frank E. Loy	Under Secretary of State for Democracy and Global Affairs; 2001–2009	Succeeded by Maria Otero
Preceded by Mitchell Reiss	United States Special Envoy for Northern Ireland; 2007–2009	Succeeded by Declan Kelly
