= Otero =

Otero is a Spanish surname, and an occasional given name, derived from the Spanish word for height, and indicating a family history of having come from a geographically high place. The name also reflects association with places in Spain having this name.

== People ==
=== Surname ===
- Alejandra Otero (born 1983), Venezuelan comedian
- Alejandro Otero (1921–1990), Venezuelan artist, writer and cultural promoter
- Angel Pérez Otero (born 1970), Puerto Rican politician
- Blas de Otero (1916–1979), Spanish poet
- Clementina Otero (1909–1996), Mexican actress
- Dan Otero (born 1985), American baseball player
- Jaime Otero Calderon (1921-1970), Bolivian congressman, mayor, secretary general, and journalist
- Jorge Otero (born 1969), Spanish footballer
- Jorge Otero Barreto (born 1937), the Puerto Rican Rambo
- La Belle Otero (1868–1965), Spanish-born dancer, actress and courtesan
- Luis Otero Mujica (1879–1940), Commander-in-Chief of the Chilean Army
- Marcelo Otero (born 1971), Uruguayan footballer
- Maria Otero (born 1950), Bolivian-born American under secretary of State
- Mariano Sabino Otero (1844-1904), territorial delegate to U.S. Congress from New Mexico
- Miguel Antonio Otero (born 1829) (1829–1882), territorial delegate to U.S. Congress from New Mexico
- Miguel Antonio Otero (born 1859) (1859–1944), territorial governor of New Mexico and author
- Miguel Otero Lathrop (1930–2025), Chilean politician, senator and ambassador
- Miguel Otero Silva (1908–1985), Venezuelan writer, journalist, humorist and politician
- Olimpio Otero Vergés (1845-1911), Puerto Rican merchant, attorney, composer, musical editor, and civic leader
- Reggie Otero (1915-1988), Cuban baseball player
- Sofía Otero (born 2013), Spanish actress
- Valerie Otero, American physics educator

=== Given name ===
- Otero Pedrayo (1888–1976), Galician geographer, writer and intellectual
