= Jack Baker =

Jack Baker may refer to:

- Jack Baker (actor) (1947–1994), American actor and writer
- Jack Baker (activist) (born 1942), American LGBT activist
- Jack Baker (baseball) (born 1950), American baseball player
- Jack Baker (footballer, born 1878) (1878–1950), Australian footballer for Geelong
- Jack Baker Jr. (1891–1952), Australian footballer for Geelong
- Jack Baker (magician) (1913/1914–1980), American magician
- Jack Baker (rugby league) (1890–1947), Australian rugby league footballer
- Jimmy Baker (footballer, born 1904) (1904–1979), Welsh footballer also known as Jack Baker
- Jack Croft Baker (1894–1962), English businessman and local politician

== Fictional ==
- Jack Baker, head of the Baker family in the Resident Evil franchise
- Jack Baker, a character from comics featuring Captain Marvel (M. F. Enterprises)

== See also ==
- John Baker (disambiguation)
