= Otero (disambiguation) =

Otero is a Spanish surname and occasional given name. Otero may also refer to:

- Otero, Spain
- Otero County, Colorado
- Otero County, New Mexico
