= 1986 United States Senate election in Colorado =

- November 4, 1986
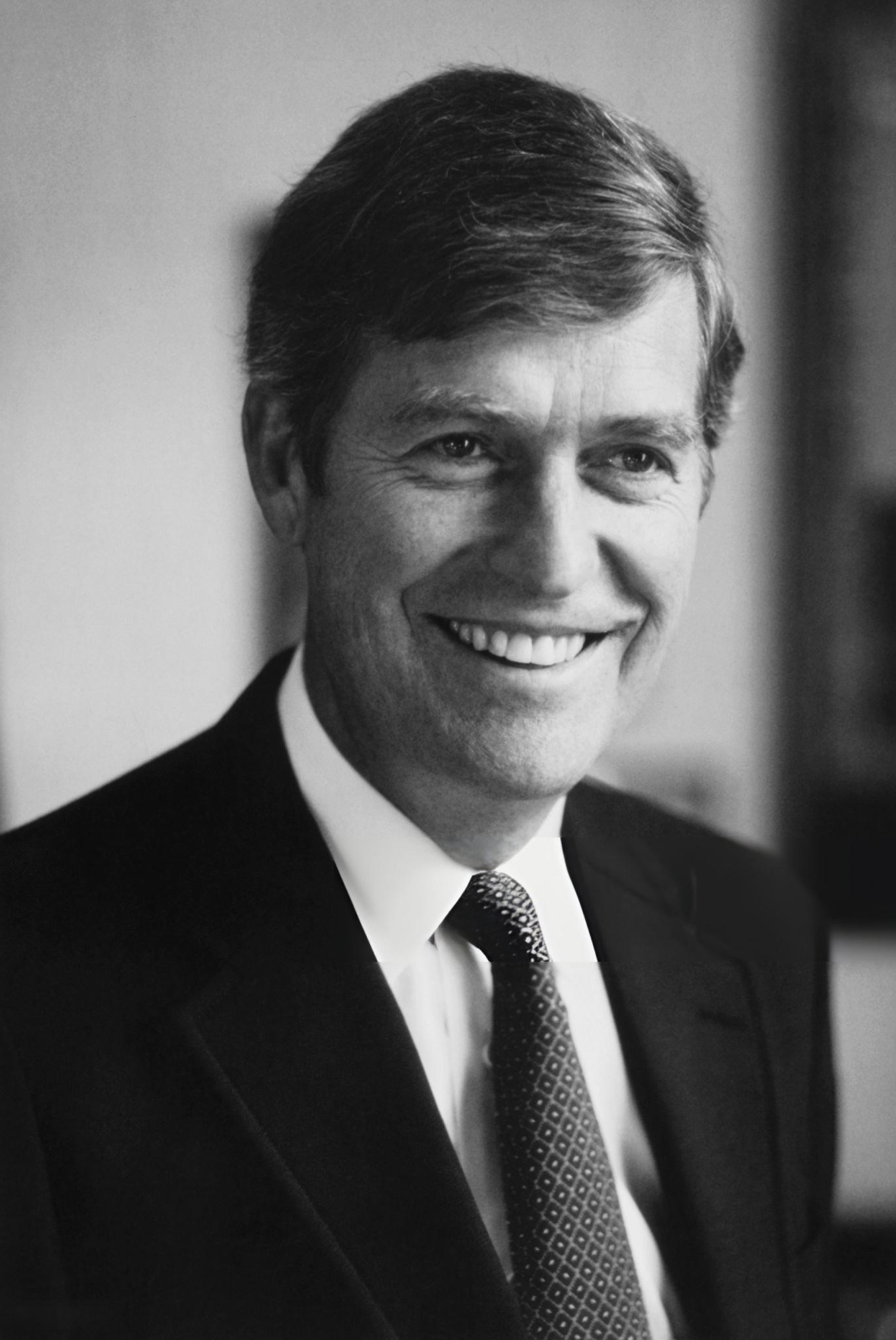

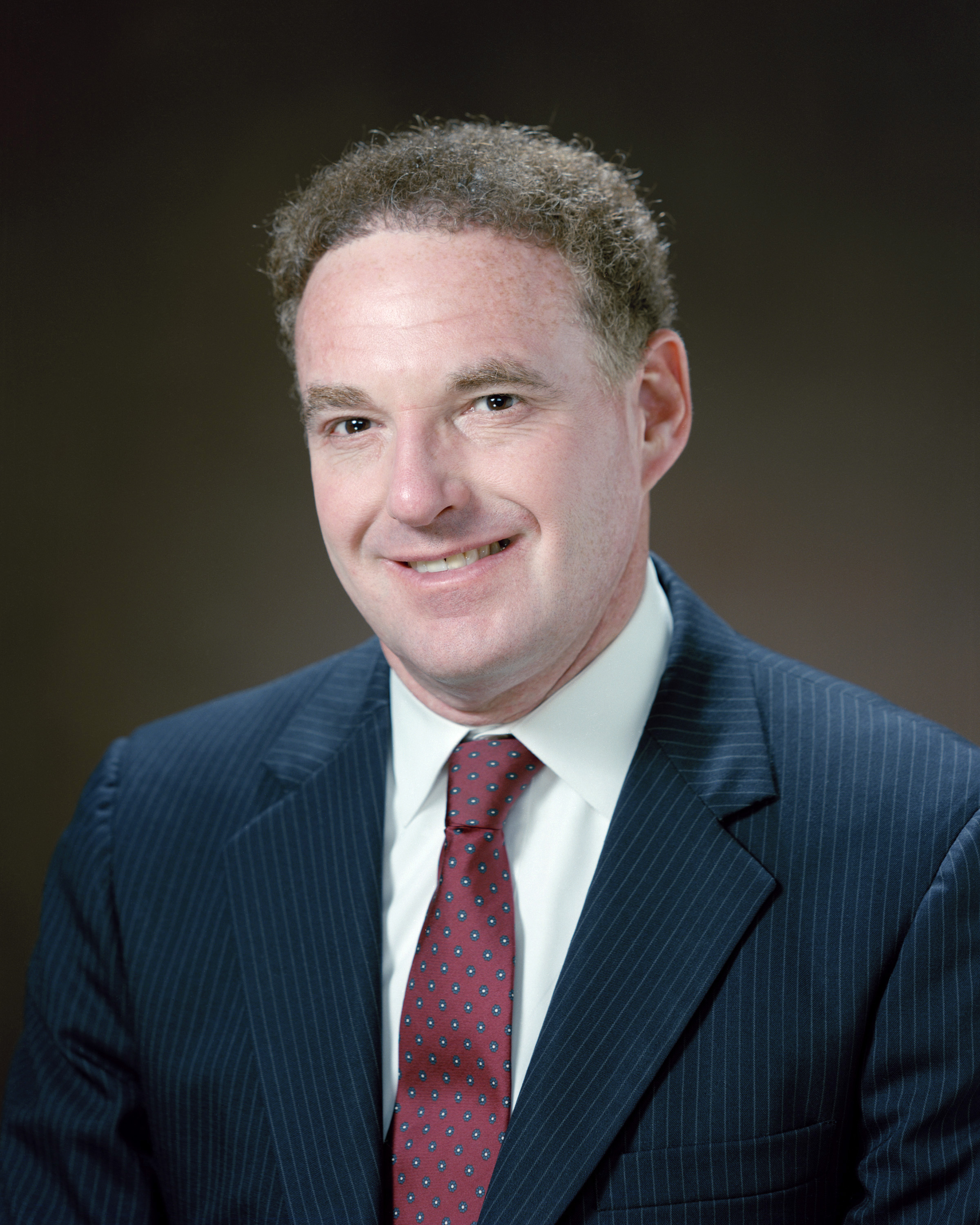
Nominee	Tim Wirth	Ken Kramer
Party	Democratic	Republican
Popular vote	529,449	512,994
Percentage	49.91%	48.36%
- County results Wirth: 40–50% 50–60% 60–70% Kramer: 40–50% 50–60% 60–70%
U.S. senator before election
Gary Hart
Democratic
Elected U.S. Senator
Tim Wirth
Democratic

The 1986 United States Senate election in Colorado was held on November 4, 1986. Incumbent Democratic U.S. Senator Gary Hart decided to vacate his Senate seat instead of seeking a third term ahead of another presidential run which he would announce right after leaving the Senate. Democratic nominee Tim Wirth won the open seat by a narrow margin, keeping it in Democrat hands for another six years.

== General election ==
=== Candidates ===
- Michael Martin Bush (Independent)
- Michael R. Chamberlain (Socialist Workers)
- Calvin G. Dodge (Prohibition)
- Ken Kramer, U.S. Representative from Colorado Springs (Republican)
- Henry John Olshaw (American Independent)
- Tim Wirth, U.S. Representative from Boulder (Democratic)

=== Results ===
General election results
Party	Candidate	Votes	%	±%
Democratic	Tim Wirth	529,449	49.91%	−0.42%
Republican	Ken Kramer	512,994	48.36%	−0.34%
Independent	Michael Martin Bush	11,127	1.05%	
Socialist Workers	Michael R. Chamberlain	3,756	0.35%	
Independent American	Henry John Olshaw	1,868	0.18%	−0.17%
Prohibition	Calvin G. Dodge	1,571	0.15%	
Majority		16,455	1.55%	−0.09%
Turnout		1,060,765		
Democratic hold		Swing		

== See also ==
- 1986 United States Senate elections
