= Uzra Zeya =

American diplomat

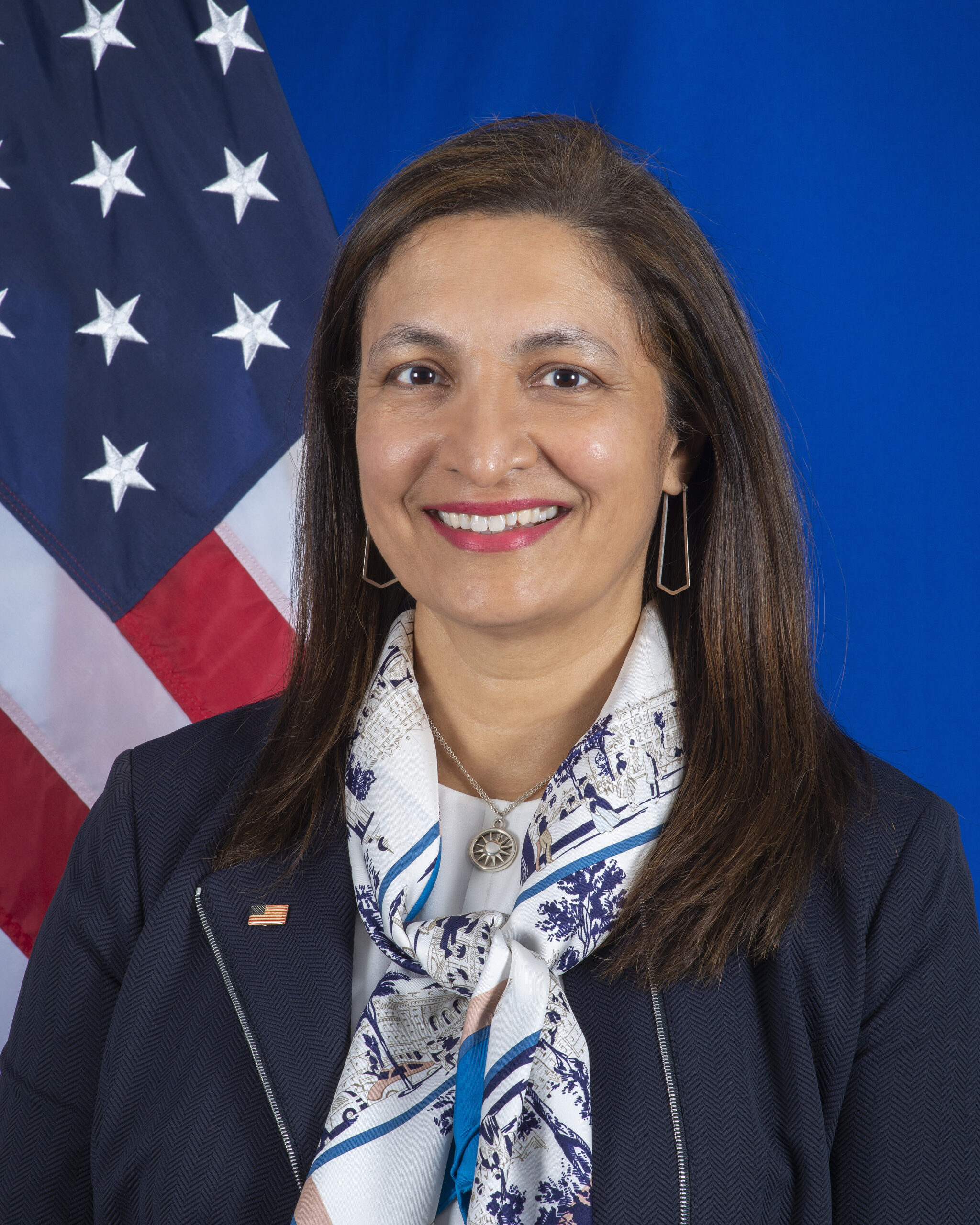

3rd Under Secretary of State for Civilian Security, Democracy, and Human Rights
- In office July 14, 2021 – January 20, 2025
- President: Joe Biden
- Preceded by: Sarah Sewall (2017)

Personal details
- Born: Chapel Hill, North Carolina, U.S.
- Education: Georgetown University (BS)

Uzra Zeya is an American diplomat who had served as the under secretary of state for civilian security, democracy, and human rights in the Biden administration. She is the current president and CEO of Human Rights First.

== Early life and education ==
Zeya was born in Chapel Hill, North Carolina, to immigrants from Bettiah, Dist West Champaran Bihar, India. She is the grand daughter of most senior advocate of Late Mohammad Obaidullah Zeya's sister, Rena Golden (née Rena Shaheen Zeya), died in 2013 due to lymphoma. Zeya graduated from the School of Foreign Service at Georgetown University.

== Career ==
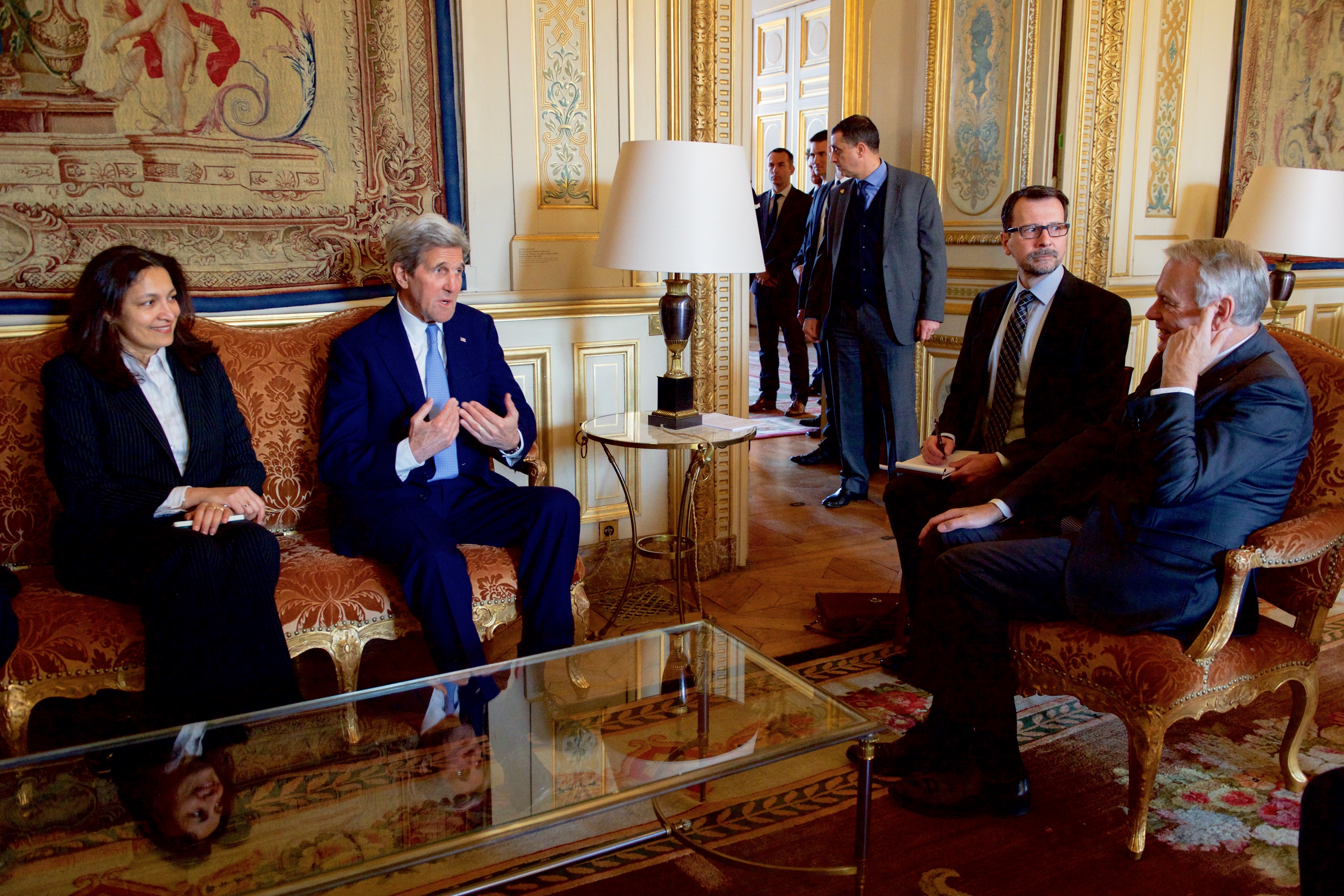
Zeya with Secretary of State John Kerry and French Foreign Minister Jean-Marc Ayrault in 2016

Uzra Zeya worked as a diplomat in the U.S. Foreign Service for 27 years. During the Obama administration, Zeya served as the acting assistant secretary and principal deputy assistant secretary in the Bureau of Democracy, Human Rights, and Labor. She also worked in the Embassy of the United States, Paris, from 2014 to 2017. In 2013, Zeya was suspected to have been involved in the arrest of Indian diplomat Devyani Khobragade. Zeya was accused of helping evacuate the domestic help's kin out of India, just two days prior to Khobragade's arrest.

In 2018, Zeya wrote in Politico wrote that she left the State Department after not being promoted because she did not pass the Trump administration's "Breitbart test" due to her race and gender.

From 2019 through 2021, Zeya served as the president and CEO of the Alliance for Peacebuilding, a network of organizations working to end violent conflict worldwide. Zeya also worked for the Albright Stonebridge Group, a Washington, D.C.–based consulting firm co-founded by former secretary of state Madeleine Albright.

=== Biden administration ===
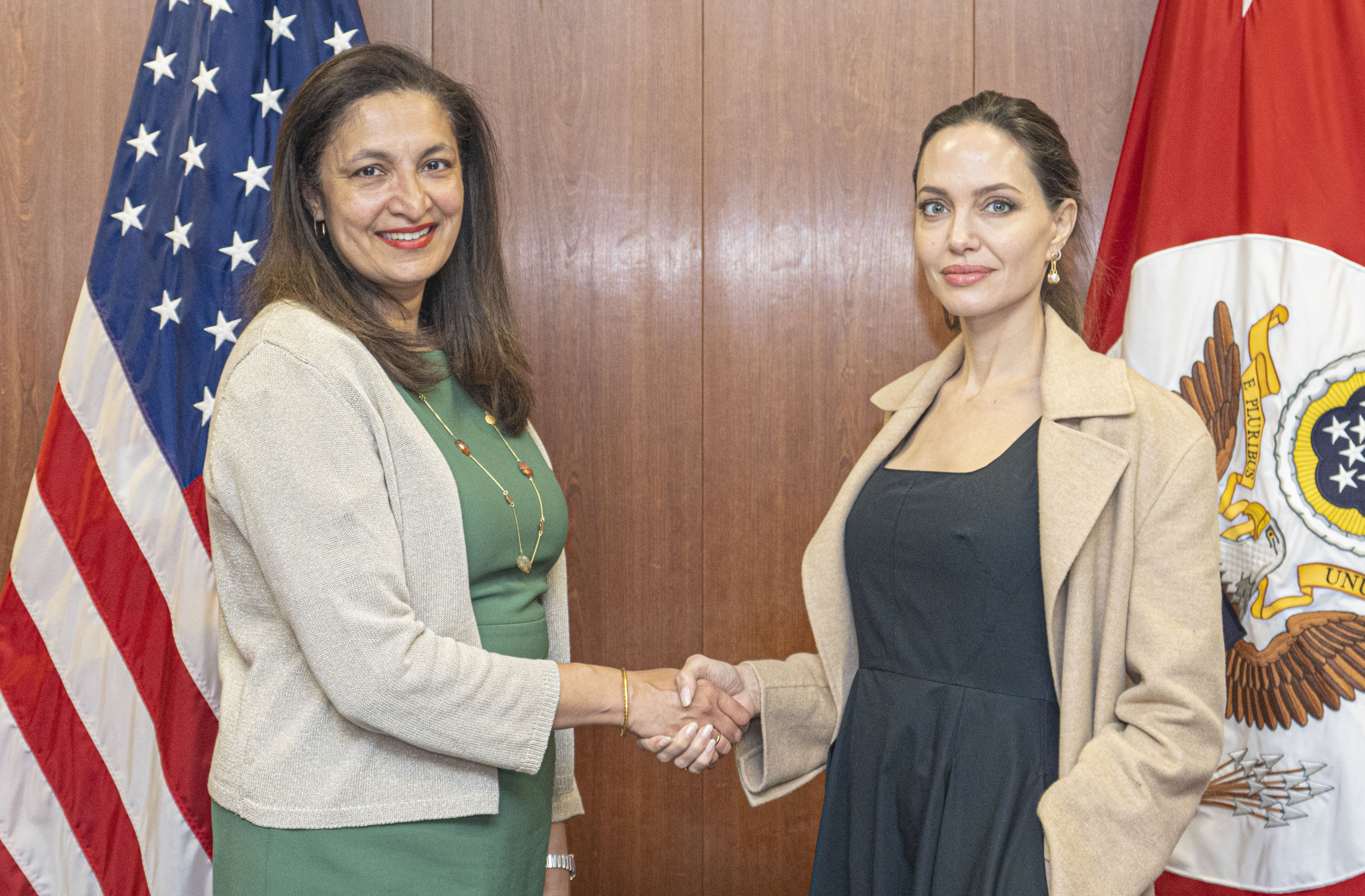
Zeya with UNHCR Special Envoy Angelina Jolie in 2022

President Joe Biden nominated Zeya to be Under Secretary of State for Civilian Security, Democracy, and Human Rights in March 2021. The Senate Foreign Relations Committee held a hearing on her nomination on April 15, 2021. The committee favorably reported the nomination to the U.S. Senate on April 21, 2021. Zeya was confirmed on July 13, 2021, by a vote of 73–24, and assumed office on July 14.

In January 2024, as Under Secretary Zeya made public remarks to the UN Security Council where she denounced Hamas, claiming it had used Palestinian civilians as "human shields," and declared Israel had sought to "expand the flow" of aid into Gaza after a UN report the previous month that Israeli authorities were blocking lifesaving aid. While citing the deaths of more than 150 staff of the United Nations Relief and Works Agency (UNRWA), she refused to attribute their deaths to Israeli attacks.

On March 20, 2024, when conditions in Gaza had worsened significantly, Zeya attended a press briefing and refused to acknowledge reports of starvation in Gaza or attribute this to Israel's restrictions and blockades. Just two days previously, the World Health Organization had warned famine in Gaza was "imminent."

As the top human rights official in the State Department, Zeya reportedly communicated the message to people under her that they should "focus on Myanmar, look at Congo, don't try to do it in Gaza."

On December 20, 2021, Zeya was designated by Secretary of State Antony Blinken to serve concurrently as the United States special coordinator for Tibetan issues. Zeya met with Tibetan exile leader Penpa Tsering in Washington, D.C., on April 25, 2022, in the first of a series of meetings to promote freedoms in Tibet.

=== Later career ===
In April 2025, Zeya was announced as the next President and CEO of Human Rights First, a leading international human rights organization founded in 1978 to advance freedom and protect rights.
