= Sarah Sewall =

American academic

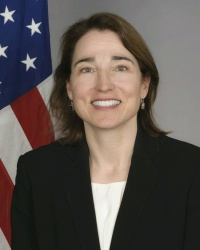

2nd Under Secretary of State for Civilian Security, Democracy, and Human Rights
- In office February 20, 2014 – January 20, 2017
- President: Barack Obama
- Preceded by: Maria Otero
- Succeeded by: Uzra Zeya (2021)

Personal details
- Born: August 21, 1961 (age 65) Boston, Massachusetts, U.S.
- Party: Democratic
- Spouse: Tom Conroy
- Education: Harvard University (BA); New College, Oxford (MPhil, DPhil)

Sarah Sewall (born August 21, 1961) is Executive Vice President for Policy at In-Q-Tel, a strategic investor for the national security community. A national security expert whose career spans government service and academia, she most recently served as Under Secretary of State for Civilian Security, Democracy, and Human Rights, where she was the key architect of the Obama administration's preventive approach to combatting violent extremism abroad. At both the Pentagon and State Department, she built and led organizations that integrated security and human rights in their policy and operational work. She spent ten years as a professor at Harvard's Kennedy School of Government, where she directed the Carr Center for Human Rights Policy. In partnership with U.S. military leaders, she helped revise U.S. counterinsurgency doctrine, led groundbreaking field assessments of U.S. civilian casualty mitigation efforts, and created new operational concepts for halting mass atrocities.

== Early years ==
Sewall became interested in anti-satellite weapons during a Washington internship, turning this topic into her undergraduate honors thesis at Harvard. She did graduate work on strategic and international studies at New College, Oxford. She worked as a military analyst for the House Democratic Study Group before becoming Senate Majority Leader George J. Mitchell's Senior Foreign Policy Advisor in 1987. In that role, she was appointed to the bipartisan Senate Arms Control Observer Group, monitoring U.S. arms negotiations and treaty compliance. For six years, Sewall advised Mitchell and drafted legislation to halt U.S. nuclear testing, halt U.S. support for Cambodian rebels, oppose chemical weapons use in Iraq, and reform the War Powers Resolution.

== Career ==
=== Department of Defense ===
In 1993, Sewall moved to the Pentagon, serving as the inaugural Deputy Assistant Secretary of Defense for Peacekeeping and Peace Enforcement Policy. She built the peacekeeping office mission, staff, and operations to provide equipment and services to the United Nations. She led Defense Department policy during the expansion of UN peacekeeping in Haiti, Somalia, and Bosnia. Under her leadership, the Peacekeeping Office also absorbed all United States Department of Defense (DOD) humanitarian policy and activities.

=== Harvard and military partnerships ===
In 2000, Sewall transitioned to academia, where she helped shape the field of civilian security. Sewall joined Harvard's Kennedy School of Government, where she launched the Project on the Means of Intervention, a ground-breaking forum for military and humanitarian actors to engage contentious questions about the conduct of war. Succeeding Michael Ignatieff, Sewall served as director of the Carr Center for Human Rights Policy for three years. She was also the Minerva Chair at the U.S. Naval War College in 2012.

As a professor, Sewall taught classes on the tension between values and interests in US foreign policy and on the use of force for almost a decade. She is best known for her research on minimizing the effects of war upon civilian populations and her work with military actors to put these ideas into practice. She collaborated with General David Petraeus to revise U.S. counterinsurgency doctrine, making humanitarian issues central to the project, and writing an influential introduction to Field Manual FM 3-24.

Sewall subsequently launched the MARO Project, a partnership with the U.S. Army Peacekeeping Institute, to develop an operational concept for intervening to halt mass atrocities. The MARO Handbook: A Military Planning Guide, was incorporated into U.S. Army doctrine.

Sewall also conceived and led the first major field study on civilian casualty mitigation, which she conducted in Afghanistan with an inter-service team of researchers over 2008–2009. The Joint Civilian Casualty Study, as the unclassified version is known, documented the viability of enhancing mission effectiveness while reducing civilian harm and provided recommendations for institutionalizing civilian protection.

=== Obama Campaign, transition, and State Department ===
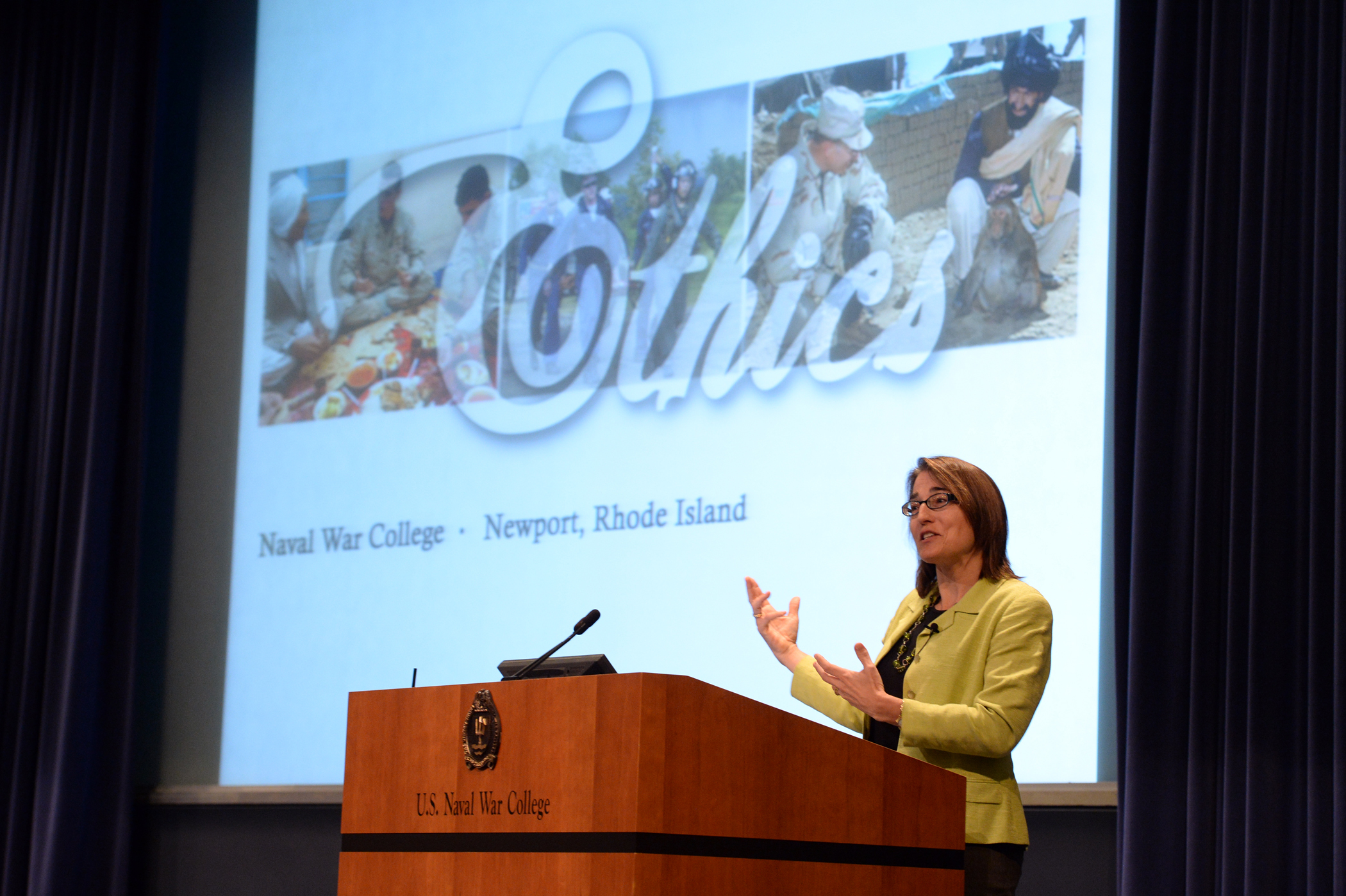
Sewall presenting at Naval War College in Newport, Rhode Island in 2014

Sewall was an early foreign policy advisor to then-candidate Barack Obama and served as a national surrogate during the 2008 campaign. She helped lead his pre-election transition effort and following the election directed the reviews of all national security, foreign policy, intelligence and development agencies before returning to Harvard.

President Obama nominated Sewall to be Under Secretary of State for Civilian Security, Democracy and Human Rights (known bureaucratically as "J") and she was confirmed on February 11, 2014. Sewall was responsible for integrating a reconfigured team of 5 bureaus and 3 offices with widely disparate missions, some 2,000 employees, and over $5 billion annual budget.

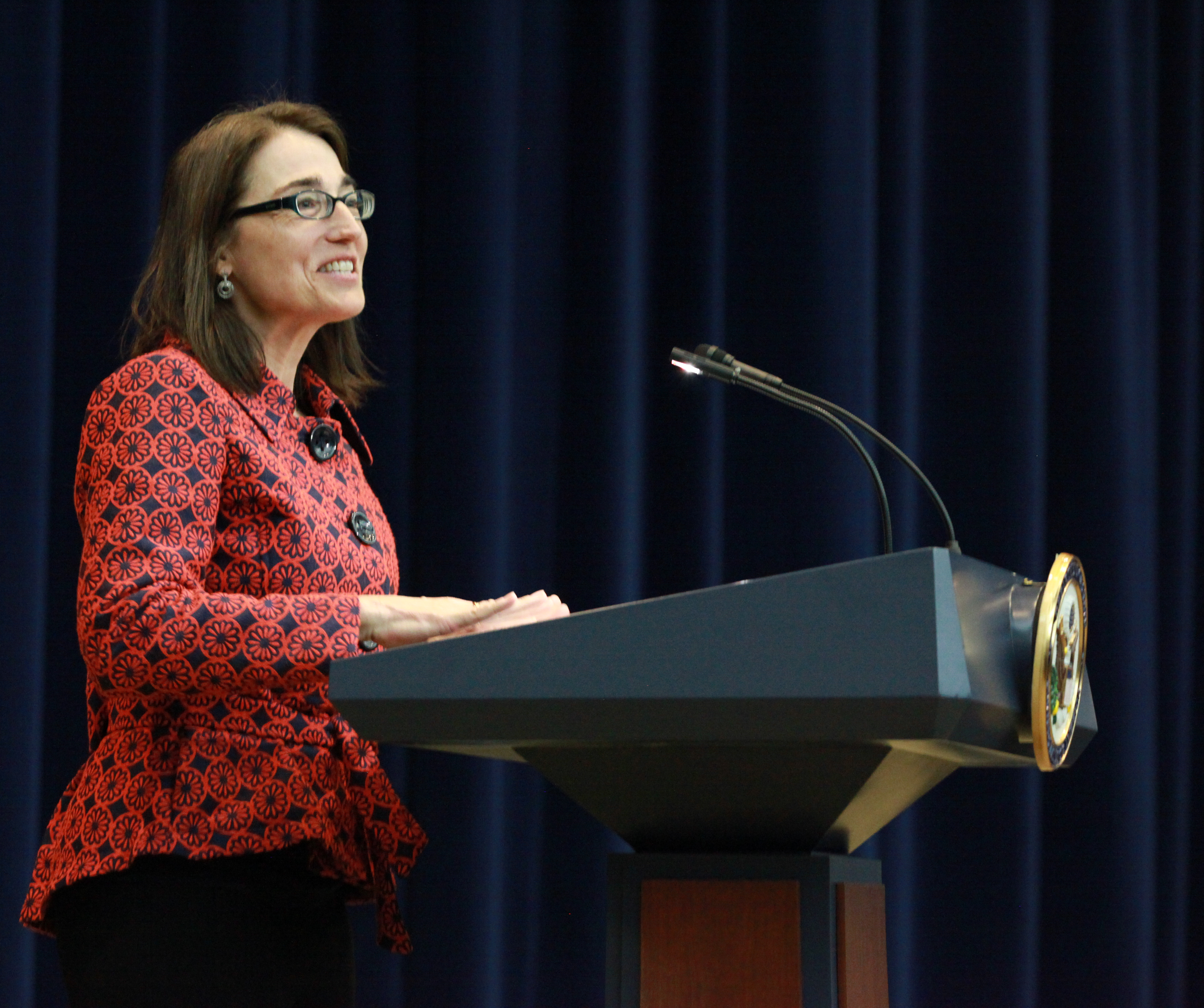
Sewall introducing Secretary John Kerry at the Strong Cities Network International Visitors Leadership Program in 2016

An early strategic review process produced a joint J mission and three key priorities that guided Sewall's tenure: preventing the spread of violent extremism, preventing mass atrocities, and advancing the rule of law and anticorruption. She is credited with spearheading the Obama administration's 2015 Countering Violent Extremism (CVE) policy and the associated White House Summit to Counter Violent Extremism hosted by the State Department. The policy harnessed non-military foreign assistance to prevent radicalization of vulnerable communities and elevated the role of civil society in prevention efforts. Sewall also consistently emphasized the importance of governance and human rights in the counterterrorism battle. The United Nations ultimately adopted this comprehensive, rights-based approach, which it calls preventing violent extremism (PVE).

Sewall also strengthened the State Department's ability to understand and prevent conflict, particularly mass killings of civilians. She worked to elevate corruption as a U.S. foreign policy priority and security issue. Sewall's personal diplomatic engagement focused on preventing conflict, terrorism, and atrocities in countries such as Nigeria, Guatemala, the Democratic Republic of Congo, Indonesia, East Africa, Bangladesh, and Kazakhstan.

== Personal life ==
Sewall has been married to Thomas P. Conroy since 1994. They have four daughters. Conroy served in the Massachusetts House of Representatives from 2007 to 2015. While in college, she competed on Harvard's women's lacrosse team.

Political offices
Preceded by Maria Otero	Undersecretary of State for Civilian Security, Democracy, and Human Rights; 2014–2017	Succeeded by Nathan Sales
Diplomatic posts
Preceded by Maria Otero	Special Coordinator for Tibetan Issues; 2014–2017	Vacant
