= Tim Wirth =

American politician

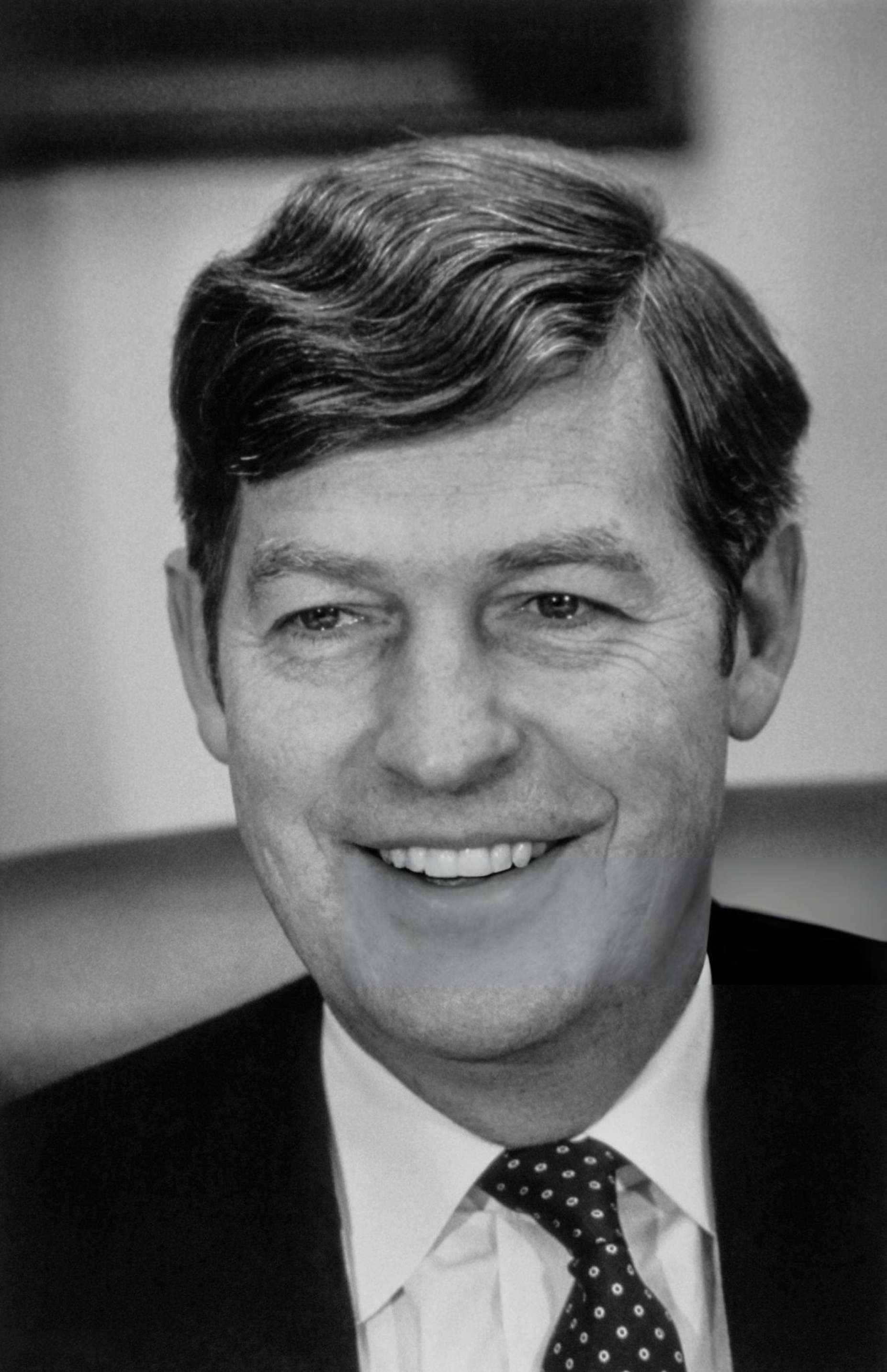
- Wirth in 1986

Under Secretary of State for Democracy and Global Affairs
- In office May 12, 1994 – December 23, 1997
- President: Bill Clinton
- Preceded by: Position established
- Succeeded by: Frank E. Loy

25th Counselor of the Department of State
- In office April 23, 1993 – April 30, 1994
- President: Bill Clinton
- Preceded by: Robert Zoellick
- Succeeded by: Wendy Sherman (1997)

United States Senator from Colorado
- In office January 3, 1987 – January 3, 1993
- Preceded by: Gary Hart
- Succeeded by: Ben Nighthorse Campbell

Member of the U.S. House of Representatives from Colorado's 2nd district
- In office January 3, 1975 – January 3, 1987
- Preceded by: Donald Brotzman
- Succeeded by: David Skaggs

Personal details
- Born: Timothy Endicott Wirth; September 22, 1939 (age 86) Santa Fe, New Mexico, U.S.
- Party: Democratic
- Spouse: Wren Winslow
- Children: 2
- Relatives: John Wirth (brother); Peter Wirth (nephew)
- Education: Harvard University (BA, MA); Stanford University (PhD)

Military service
- Allegiance: United States
- Branch/service: United States Army
- Years of service: 1961–1967
- Unit: United States Army Reserve

Timothy Endicott Wirth (born September 22, 1939) is an American politician from Colorado who served as a Democrat in both the United States Senate (1987–1993) and the United States House of Representatives (1975–1987). He also served in several appointed roles in government, including as Deputy Assistant Secretary for Education during the Nixon Administration and Under Secretary of State for Global Affairs for the U.S. State Department during the Clinton administration. From 1998 to 2013, he served as the president of the United Nations Foundation, and currently sits on the Foundation's board.

== Early life and education ==
Wirth is a graduate of Graland Country Day School (1954) in Denver, and Phillips Exeter Academy. He received his B.A. and graduate degree from Harvard University and was awarded a PhD from Stanford University in 1973. He served as a member of the Harvard Board of Overseers.

Wirth served as a vice president of Great Western Cities Company, part of Great Western United, in 1970–1971. The CEO of GWU was William M. White Jr., age 31, in 1971, when Wirth described White and Wirth reading Future Shock and passing copies to the "older generation" of company directors.

== United States Representative ==
Wirth began his political career as a White House Fellow under President Lyndon Johnson and was Deputy Assistant Secretary for Education in the Nixon Administration. In 1970, Wirth returned to Colorado and ran successfully for the U.S. House of Representatives in 1974, unseating incumbent Republican Donald G. Brotzman by a 52% to 48% margin. He represented Boulder and the Denver suburbs in Congress from 1975 to 1987. As a first term Congressman, Wirth organized the "Freshman Revolt" in 1975 unseating a handful of "old bull" committee chairmen, and encouraging others to be more inclusive. Wirth had a number of difficult reelections during his 12 years in Congress, and raised large sums of money to get reelected. With colleagues Norman Mineta, Leon Panetta and Dick Gephardt, he was part of "The Gang of Four" on the House Budget Committee challenging the budget process with bipartisan budget ideas, and developing a high technology and alternative budget in 1982. As Chair of the Telecommunications Subcommittee, he was the lead legislator in bringing competition to the video and telephone industries. Wirth also authored the Indian Peaks Wilderness Act of 1978.

== United States Senator ==
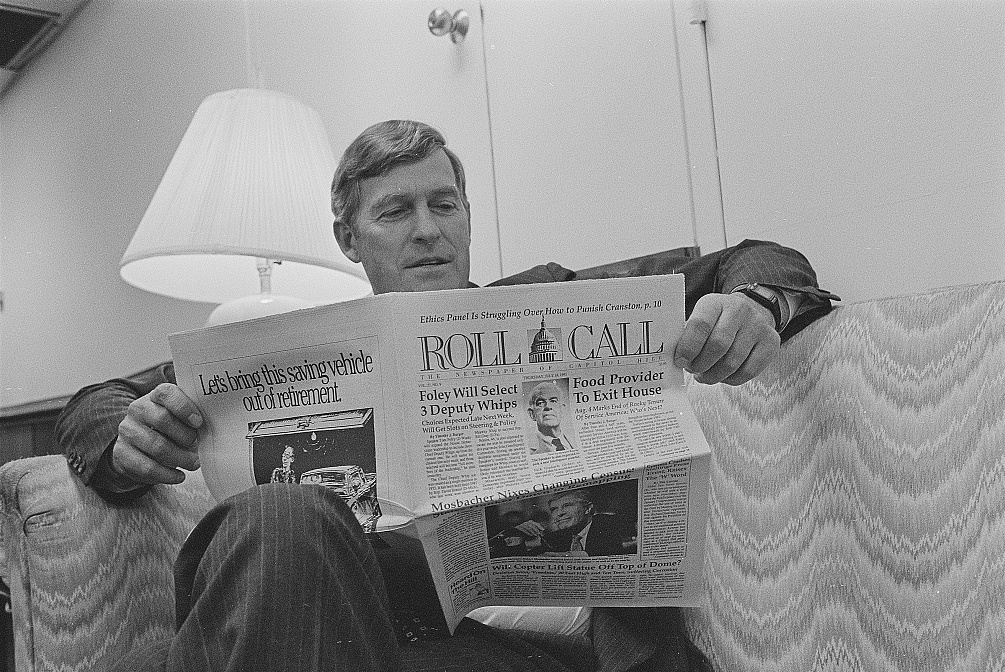
Senator Wirth reading an issue of Roll Call in 1991

In 1986, Wirth ran for the U.S. Senate and won his party's nomination unopposed to replace Senator Gary Hart. The general election was more difficult than expected, and he defeated fellow U.S. Representative Ken Kramer by a narrow margin. In the Senate, he focused on environmental issues, particularly global climate change, and organized the historic Hansen hearings on climate change in 1988. At the hearings, Hansen testified that the Earth is warmer than at any other time in recent history, and that this can be attributed to human activity with 99% certainty. The hearings are widely credited with first bringing climate change into the public discourse. With his close friend, the late Senator John Heinz (R-PA), he authored "Project 88", outlining the groundbreaking "Cap and Trade" idea which became law in the Clean Air Act Amendments of 1990. He authored the far-reaching Colorado Wilderness Bill which became law in 1993, and with Senator Alan Simpson (R-WY) he authored major legislation focused on population stabilization. Wirth also organized the Senate Task Force on the Expansion of Major League Baseball, which became a major factor in the awarding of a new expansion franchise to Denver. He chose not to run for re-election in 1992, citing in a front page cover story in the Sunday New York Times Magazine (August 9, 1992), frustration with the ever-increasing role of money in politics to the exclusion of focus on public policy.

=== After Congressional service ===
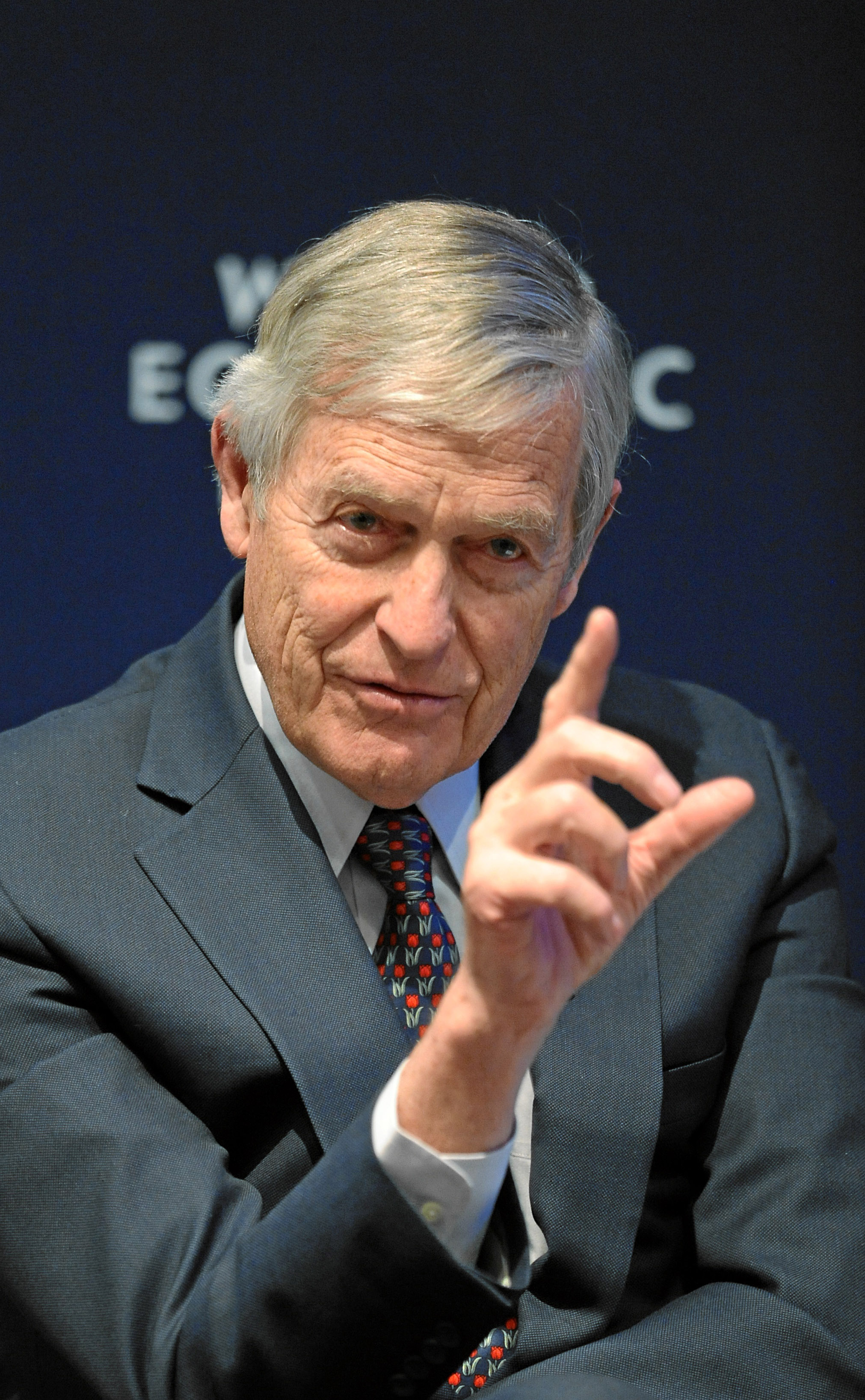
Wirth during the WEF 2011

Following two decades of elected politics, Wirth was national co-chair of the Clinton–Gore campaign, and served in the U.S. Department of State as the first Undersecretary for Global Affairs from 1993 to 1997. He led U.S. foreign policy in the areas of refugees, population, environment, science, human rights and narcotics. He chaired the United States Delegation at the 1994 Cairo Conference on Population and Development, and was the lead U.S. negotiator for the Kyoto Climate Conference until he resigned from the Administration in late 1997 to accept Ted Turner's invitation to be President of the newly created United Nations Foundation. As President of the UN Foundation (UNF) from 1998 to 2013, Wirth organized and led the formulation of the Foundation's mission and program priorities, which include the environment, women and population, children's health, and peace, security and human rights. The Foundation also engages in extensive public advocacy, fundraising, and institutional strengthening efforts on behalf of the United Nations. By mobilizing these diverse resources, the UN Foundation works with many public and private partners and manages a variety of campaigns to help solve major problems facing the UN and the world community.

=== Work with the United Nations Foundation ===
- Mobilizing resources in support of the eradication of polio with Rotary International, the Gates Foundation, and the World Bank;
- Initiating a global campaign to diminish the impact of measles with the American Red Cross, the Centers for Disease Control and UN Agencies;
- Stimulating a nationwide grassroots program for the purchase of anti-malaria bed nets ("Nothing But Nets") with many partners (including the World Health Organization and the National Basketball Association);
- Organizing support for the special needs of adolescent girls within the UN and many private sector partners with Nike and lead UN Agencies;
- Supporting the United Nations Population Fund, and working with Congress to increase U.S. funding and bring greater focus to AIDS prevention;
- Developing standards for better managing tourism's impact on the environment and contribution to climate change in close partnership with UNESCO and with Expedia and other industry leaders;
- Leading work to develop the UN framework for the post-Kyoto climate negotiations through a close partnership with the UN's leadership and retired heads of State throughout the world (The Club of Madrid);
- Managing a public-private effort with major segments of the agriculture community and UN agencies for better understanding of the promise, challenge and economics of bioenergy; and
- Advancing aggressive standards for energy efficiency in the U.S. and abroad with the U.S.-centered Energy Future Coalition.

The University of Colorado at Denver has an endowed Tim Wirth Chair in Environmental and Community Development Policy. The current holder of the chair is the man Wirth replaced in the Senate, Gary Hart.

Wirth is a member of the ReFormers Caucus of Issue One.

In his retirement, Wirth has been supportive of the youth climate justice movement. He has been active in efforts to convince his alma mater, Harvard University, to divest from fossil fuels, and in March 2021 joined Harvard students, faculty, and alumni to file an official legal complaint charging that the university's fossil fuel investments were illegal under Massachusetts law. In response to the legal complaint and other efforts, Harvard committed to divestment from fossil fuels in the fall of 2021.

== Personal life ==
Wirth is married to Wren Winslow Wirth, the president of the Winslow Foundation. They have two children, Chris and Kelsey Wirth. Their daughter, Kelsey Wirth, is the co-founder of the orthodontic production company Align Technology. Their son, Chris Wirth, is the founder of Liberty Puzzles, the largest American laser-cut jigsaw puzzle company, based in Boulder, Colorado. His nephew, Peter Wirth, was elected to the New Mexico Legislature in 2004. His brother, the late John Wirth, was the Gildred Professor of Latin American Studies at Stanford University.

== See also ==
- Atari Democrat

U.S. House of Representatives
Preceded by Donald G. Brotzman	Member of the U.S. House of Representatives from Colorado's 2nd congressional district 1975–1987	Succeeded by David Skaggs
Party political offices
Preceded by Robert Byrd, Alan Cranston, Al Gore, Gary Hart, Bennett Johnston, Ted Kennedy, Tip O'Neill, Don Riegle, Paul Sarbanes, Jim Sasser	Response to the State of the Union address 1983; Served alongside: Les AuCoin, Joe Biden, Bill Bradley, Robert Byrd, Tom Daschle, Bill Hefner, Barbara Kennelly, George Miller, Tip O'Neill, Paul Simon, Paul Tsongas	Succeeded by Max Baucus, Joe Biden, David Boren, Barbara Boxer, Robert Byrd, Dante Fascell, Bill Gray, Tom Harkin, Dee Huddleston, Carl Levin, Tip O'Neill, Claiborne Pell
Preceded by Gary Hart	Democratic nominee for U.S. Senator from Colorado (Class 3); 1986	Succeeded by Ben Nighthorse Campbell
U.S. Senate
Preceded by Gary Hart	U.S. Senator (Class 3) from Colorado; 1987–1993; Served alongside: William L. Armstrong, Hank Brown	Succeeded by Ben Nighthorse Campbell
Diplomatic posts
Preceded by Robert Zoellick	Counselor of the Department of State; 1993–1994	Vacant Title next held by Wendy Sherman
New office	Under Secretary of State for Democracy and Global Affairs; 1994–1997	Succeeded by Frank E. Loy
U.S. order of precedence (ceremonial)
Preceded by Norm Coleman as Former U.S. Senator	Order of precedence of the United States	Succeeded by Hank Brown as Former U.S. Senator
