= Jonathan Baker =

Jonathan Baker may refer to:

- Jonathan Baker (bishop) (born 1966), Bishop of Fulham
- Jonathan Baker (judge) (born 1955), judge of the High Court of England and Wales
- Jonathan Baker (racing driver) (born 1959), British racing driver

== See also ==
- John Baker (disambiguation)
- Jonathan Barker (c. 1952–2018), American-born Canadian film producer
