= Nick Dowling =

American scientist

- Born: Nick Dowling
- Citizenship: U.S.
- Education: Harvard University (B.A.); Georgetown University (Master's)
- Scientific career
- Fields: National Security, Military Training, Foreign Affairs
- Workplaces: IDS International; U.S. National Security Council; National Defense University

Nick Dowling is the founder and president of IDS International. He focuses on stability operations and interagency coordination in both the public and private sectors.

== Early life and education ==
Dowling has a Bachelor's from Harvard University and a Master's in National Security Studies from the Georgetown University School of Foreign Service.

== Career ==
He was Director for European Affairs at the National Security Council (NSC) where he coordinated Bosnia and Kosovo policy to help bring an end to the Balkan wars. Prior to that, he was a defense fellow in the Office of the Secretary of Defense, a senior fellow at the National Defense University and a policy advisor for two presidential campaigns and a U.S. Senate campaign.

Dowling is the acting president of IDS International, a national security firm that trains the US Army and Marines in operations. He leads an IDS team, covering stability operations, inter-agency coordination and reconstruction.

After founding IDS International in 2001, Dowling helped the company become a provider in training on interagency coordination in conflict zones that included Iraq and Afghanistan.

He is also a lifetime member of the Council on Foreign Relations.
