= Maria Otero =

Bolivian-American diplomat (born 1950)

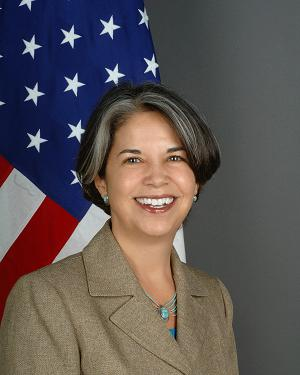

1st Under Secretary of State for Civilian Security, Democracy, and Human Rights
- In office August 11, 2009 – February 4, 2013
- President: Barack Obama
- Preceded by: Position established
- Succeeded by: Sarah Sewall

Personal details
- Born: 1950 (age 75–76) La Paz, Bolivia
- Party: Democratic
- Spouse: Joseph Eldridge
- Relatives: Jaime Aparicio Otero (cousin); Jaime Otero Calderón (uncle)
- Education: University of Maryland, College Park (BA, MA); Johns Hopkins University (MA)

Maria Otero (born 1950) was the first holder of the office of the Under Secretary for Civilian Security, Democracy, and Human Rights from January 15, 2012, through February 4, 2013. She also served as the President's Special Coordinator for Tibetan Issues.

== Biography ==
Otero was born in La Paz, Bolivia, one of nine children, and moved to the United States at the age of 12 when her father was one of the founding officers of the Inter-American Development Bank. Her uncle was Jaime Otero Calderon, a Bolivian statesman. Her cousin is Jaime Aparicio Otero, a Bolivian Ambassador to the US and former President of the Inter-American Juridical Committee of the OAS.

She received a B.A. from the University of Maryland and also an M.A. in literature from that university; she also holds an M.A. in international relations from the Paul H. Nitze School of Advanced International Studies (SAIS), at the Johns Hopkins University. She attended the London Business School Executive Leadership Program in 1999. From 1997- 2008 she served as an adjunct professor at SAIS.

She is married to Joseph T. Eldridge, a human rights advocate who is Senior Fellow at the Washington Office of Latin America (WOLA) and was, for 19 years the head chaplain at American University. They have three children, Justin, David and Ana and one grandchild, named Lila.

== Career ==
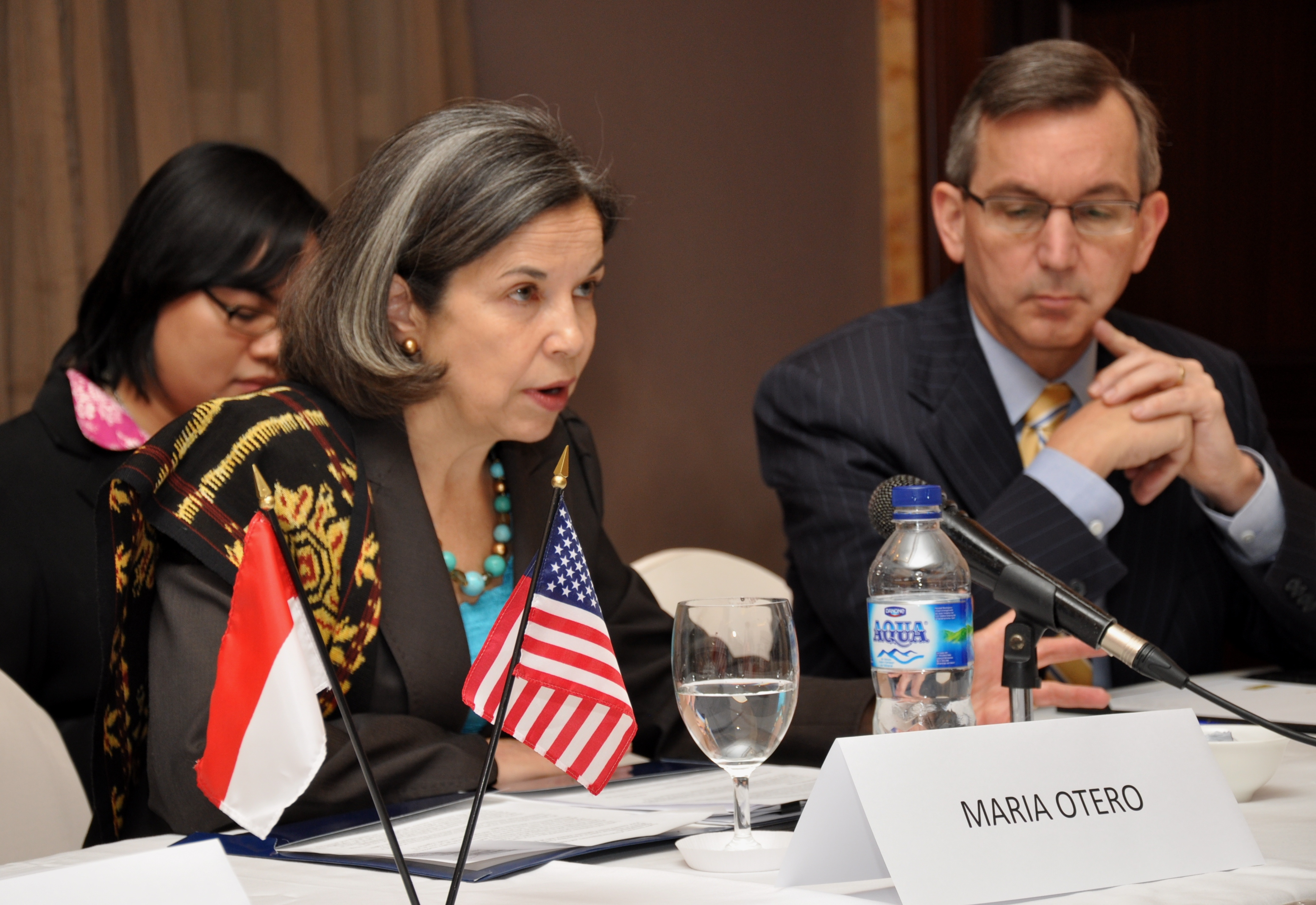
Otero and Scot Marciel in 2011

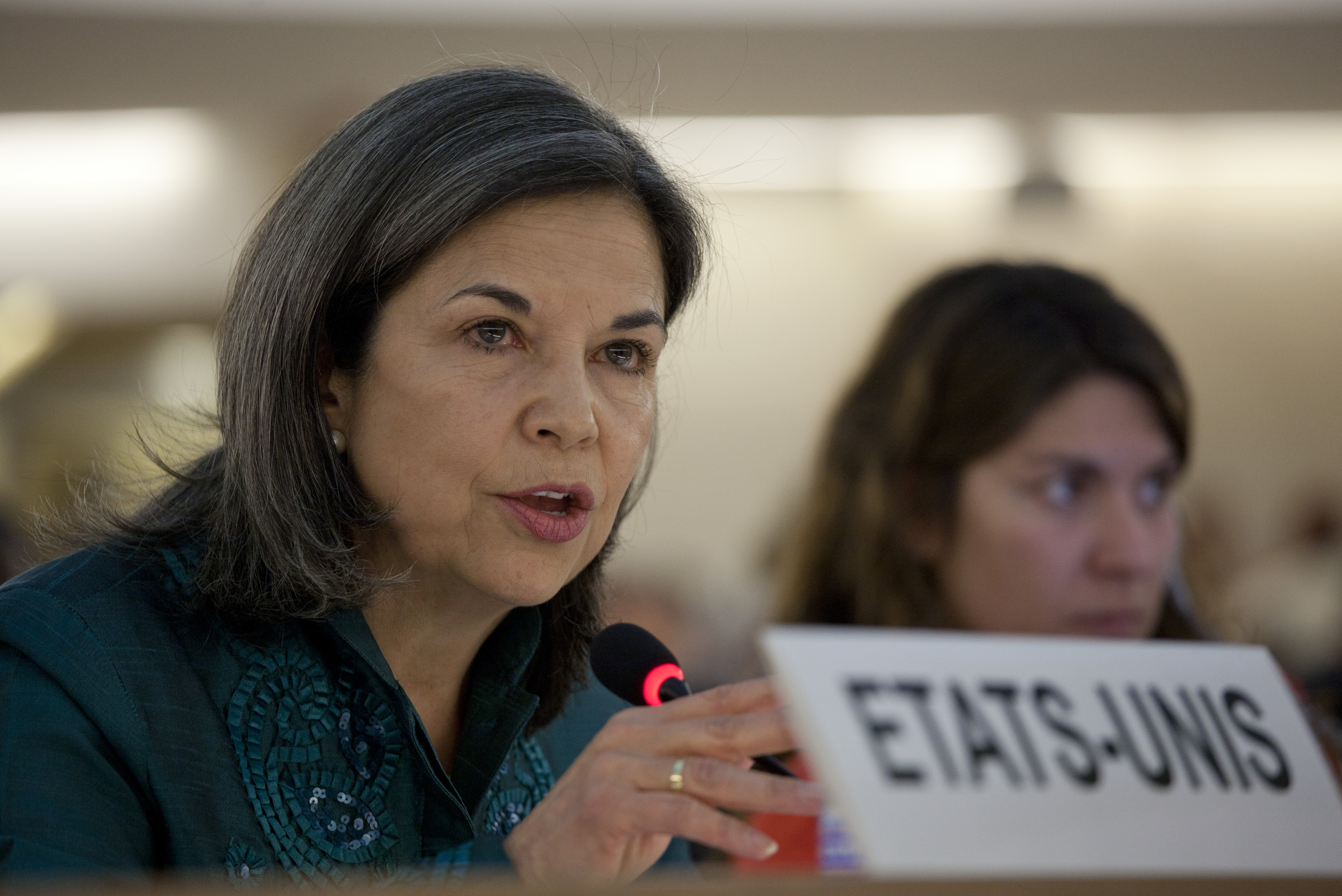
Otero addressing the United Nations Human Rights Council in Geneva in 2012

Otero was the Economist for Latin America for the Women in Development office of USAID. She also served for five years at the Centre for Development and Population Activities (CEDPA). She joined ACCION International in 1986 and was appointed president and CEO in 2000 replacing Michael Chu. In this position, she was a pioneer in microfinance working in 25 countries. She chaired the board of ACCION Investments, an equity fund that invested in micro finance banks globally. She served on the boards of various microfinance banks in Latin America. She published on the subject and spoke throughout the world on microfinance, women's issues and poverty alleviation. She is co-editor with Elisabeth Holmes Rhyne of the 1994 book The New World of Microenterprise Finance : Building Healthy Financial Institutions for the Poor.

She then returned to government service as Under Secretary for Democracy and Global Affairs from August 10, 2009, through 2011, the precursor to the expanded responsibilities as Under Secretary for Civilian Security, Democracy, and Human Rights, which she held until 2013.

Otero is currently a trustee of the Kresge Foundation, the Public Welfare Foundation, Herbalife (NASDAQ:HLF), Development Alternatives Inc, and Bancosol, a US$1.5 Billion microfinance bank in Bolivia. She also serves on the board of Oxfam America.

== Recognition ==
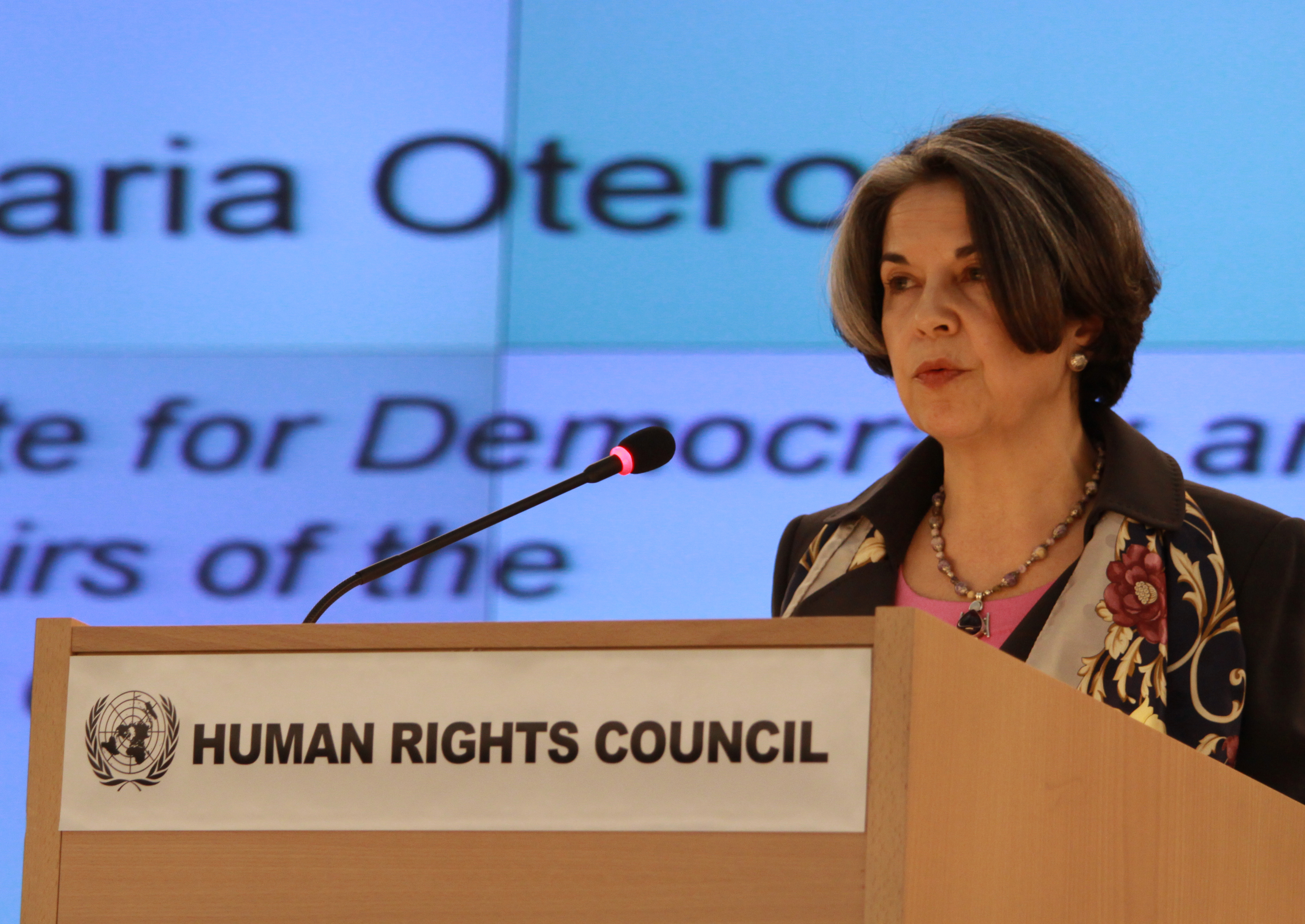
Otero addressing the United Nations Human Rights Council in Geneva in 2010

Otero's awards include selection by Newsweek in October 2005 as one of the United States' 20 most influential women; Hispanic Business Magazines ‘Elite Women of 2007’; Notre Dame University's Distinguished Service in Latin America Award; and the Ellis Island Medal of Honor. She has received an honorary Doctorate of Humane Letters from Dartmouth College.

In June 2006, she was appointed to the UN Advisors Group on Inclusive Financial Sectors. She served on the board of the U.S. Institute of Peace, a position to which she was originally appointed by President Bill Clinton. She has chaired the board of Bread for the World, and also served on the boards of the Calvert Foundation, Public Welfare Foundation, the Inter-American Foundation and BRAC in Bangladesh. She is a member of the Council on Foreign Relations.

Otero is the first Latina Under Secretary in the State Department's history.

Political offices
| Preceded by Paula Dobriansky | Under Secretary of State for Civilian Security, Democracy, and Human Rights; 2009–2013 | Succeeded by Sarah Sewall |
