= Jack Baker Jr. =

Australian rules footballer (1891–1952)

Jack Baker

Personal information
- Full name: John Edward Baker
- Born: 9 December 1891; Geelong, Victoria
- Died: 18 January 1952 (aged 60); Heidelberg, Victoria
- Height: 180 cm (5 ft 11 in)
- Weight: 70 kg (154 lb)
- Position: Ruck

Playing career^{1}
Years	Club	Games (Goals)
1913–15, 1917	Geelong	55 (17)
- ^{1} Playing statistics correct to the end of 1917.

John Edward Baker (9 December 1891 – 18 January 1952) was an Australian rules footballer who played with Geelong in the Victorian Football League (VFL).
