= John William Baker =

American-born Spanish slave trader

A portrait of Baker

A portrait of Josefa Eufemio Barcelo y Villa Muñoz Valdespino, Baker's second wife

John William Baker Palace Sketch, Trinidad, Cuba

Juan Guillermo Béquer (born John William Baker; March 10, 1781 – March 16, 1860) was an American-born Spanish slave trader and planter who spent most of his life in Cuba.

== Early life ==
He was the son of Jacob Baker, a merchant based in Philadelphia, Pennsylvania, and his wife Hannah Smith.

== Career ==
In 1805, he moved to Trinidad, Cuba, and became wealthy through his involvement in several businesses, including the Atlantic slave trade and owning sugar plantations. He became a naturalized Spanish citizen in 1819, and changed his name to "Juan Guillermo Béquer". Baker was subsequently awarded the titles of Knight Grand Cross of the Order of Isabella the Catholic, Knight of the Order of Charles III, and Knight of the Order of Santiago by Isabella II. He was to be made a member of the Spanish nobility with the title of "Marquess of San Juan de Piedras Albas", but Baker died before it could be conferred on him.

Baker built himself a mansion in Trinidad. Legend says that he was so wealthy that when Baker tried to lay a mosaic of doubloons in the floor of the dining room, the Spanish authorities pointed out it would be improper to walk on the coat of arms of Spain, so he inlaid them in the floor on their edges.
