= Frank E. Loy =

American diplomat, business and nonprofit executive and attorney

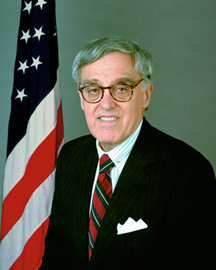

2nd Under Secretary of State for Global Affairs
- In office November 2, 1998 – January 20, 2001
- President: Bill Clinton
- Preceded by: Tim Wirth
- Succeeded by: Paula Dobriansky

2nd Director of the Bureau of Refugee Programs
- In office June 1, 1980 – January 30, 1981
- Preceded by: John A. Baker Jr.
- Succeeded by: Richard David Vine

Personal details
- Born: December 25, 1928 (age 97) Nuremberg, Germany
- Party: Democratic Party
- Spouse: Dale Haven Loy
- Children: 2
- Education: University of California, Los Angeles; Harvard Law School
- Portfolio: Democracy, Human Rights, and Labor; Environment, Oceans, Health and Science; Population, Refugees, and Migration; International Narcotics and Law Enforcement Affairs

Frank E. Loy (born December 25, 1928) is an American diplomat, business and nonprofit executive, and attorney. He is best known for serving as United States Under Secretary of State for Global Affairs from November 2, 1998, to January 20, 2001, under President Bill Clinton. In that position, he was the chief United States negotiator for issues such as climate change and trade on genetically modified agricultural products.

He has been senior vice president for international affairs at Pan American Airways, president of the German Marshall Fund of the United States, president of the Penn Central Corporation, and an attorney with O’Melveny & Myers.

== Early and personal life ==
Frank E. Loy was born on December 25, 1928, in Nuremberg, Germany. Raised in Germany, Italy and Switzerland in his early years, Loy went to public schools in Los Angeles from the age of 10. He earned a B.A. degree at the University of California, Los Angeles and an LL.B. at Harvard Law School. Following law school, he served for 21 months in the United States Army.

He lives in Washington, D.C., with his wife, Dale Haven Loy, a painter. They have two children and four grandchildren.

== Private career ==
Loy began his career practicing corporate law in Los Angeles with the firm of O'Melveny & Myers. From 1970 to 1973 he served as Senior Vice President for International and Regulatory Affairs of Pan American World Airways.

He spent the years 1974 to 1979 as a partner in the turnaround firm that successfully brought the Penn Central Transportation Company out of bankruptcy. It was then the largest industrial bankruptcy in American history. In that role he served as president of the subsidiary that operated all the non-railroad businesses of the bankrupt – including an oil pipeline, an oil refinery, the Six Flags theme parks, and the Arvida Corp., a Florida land and resort development company. Loy also oversaw operations of Penn Central's New York hotels, the Roosevelt, the Biltmore, the Barclay (now the Intercontinental), and the Commodore (now the Grand Hyatt), as well as the operations of major investments, such as the Madison square Garden Corporation. When the bankruptcy terminated, he became president of the successor company, the Penn Central Corporation, listed on the New York Stock Exchange.

== Government service ==
Loy's first government role was as Special Assistant to the Administrator of the Federal Aviation Administration and director of that agency's Office of Policy Development, the FAA's economic analysis and planning shop.

He served in the Department of State under four administrations, nominated the last three times by the Presidents Carter, Clinton and Obama. From 1965 to 1970 he was Deputy Assistant Secretary for Economic Affairs. In that role he negotiated numerous international bilateral air transport agreements, represented the U.S. at meetings of the International Civil Aviation Organization (ICAO), and the International Maritime Organization (IMCO), and was vice-chair of the U.S. delegation to the multinational negotiations that successfully created the present structure of Intelsat, the organization that operates the space segments of the international communications network.

From 1980 to 1981 he was Director of the State Department's Bureau of Population, Refugees, and Migration, with the personal rank of Ambassador.

From 1998 to 2001 he was Under Secretary for Global Affairs. His portfolio included human rights, the promotion of democracy, international criminal activity and narcotics, refugees and population affairs, and environmental matters. He served as chief U.S. negotiator for climate change. In 2011 he served as Deputy U.S. Representative to the UN General Assembly.

== Nonprofit work ==
From 1981 to 1995, Loy was president of the German Marshall Fund of the United States, an American institution whose original capital was a gift from the German government as memorial to the Marshall Plan. It concentrated exclusively on issues affecting both Europe and the U.S., particularly in the fields of economics, politics and the environment.

Following the fall of the Berlin Wall, GMF concentrated the bulk of its resources on promoting democratic institutions (such as an independent press, a functioning legislature, effective political parties, an independent judiciary, a civil society of non-governmental institutions, etc.) in former Soviet-bloc Eastern European countries.

He served in 1994 as Chair of the Conference of Parties of the Convention on International Trade in Endangered Species (CITIES), in which over 1,000 delegates from more than 120 countries and over 500 observers participated. In 1996, Loy was a Visiting Lecturer at the Yale Law School, teaching a course in international environmental law and policy.

Loy has chaired numerous boards of directors of non-profit organizations, particularly in the field of environment, climate change and family planning. These boards include Population Services International (PSI), ecoAmerica, Round Table on Environmental Medicine and Health of the National Academy of Medicine, Environmental Defense Fund, Resources For The Future, and The Washington Ballet.

His prior boards also include The Foundation for A Civil Society (chair), which promoted democratic development in Central and Eastern Europe; the Budapest-based Regional Environmental Center for Central and Eastern Europe, to which he was appointed in 1990 by President George H. W. Bush, the League of Conservation Voters, and the Foundation for a Civil Society, which has conducted programs promoting democratic institutions in Central and Eastern Europe, particularly Czechia and Slovakia. Loy was a founding board member of the Climate Speakers Network, which was subsequently absorbed into the Climate Reality Project.

== Sources ==
Government offices
Preceded by John A. Baker, Jr.	Director of the Bureau of Refugee Programs; June 1, 1980 – January 30, 1981	Succeeded by Richard David Vine
