= John A. Baker Jr. =

American diplomat

1st Director of the Bureau of Refugee Programs
- In office August 26, 1979 – October 30, 1980
- Preceded by: Position established
- Succeeded by: Frank E. Loy

Personal details
- Born: October 3, 1927; Connecticut
- Died: August 16, 1994 (aged 66)
- Spouse(s): Sarah Kendall Bragg; Katharine (nee Gratwick)
- Children: 5
- Education: Yale University

John Alexander Baker Jr. (October 3, 1927 – August 16, 1994) was a United States diplomat, most notable for serving as Director of the Bureau of Refugee Programs from 1979 to 1980.

== Biography ==
Baker was born and raised in Connecticut. He served in the United States Army during World War II. After the war, he was educated at Yale University, graduating in 1949, and the Graduate Institute of International Studies in Geneva.

He joined the United States Foreign Service in 1950. He was stationed as a political officer in Belgrade 1951–52. From 1953 to 1956, he worked for Voice of America as Chief of Yugoslav Broadcasts. He received Russian language training in Oberammergau in 1957 and was then posted in Moscow as a political officer from 1957 to 1958. While vacationing with his wife in Amsterdam, he was informed that he could not return to the Soviet Union because the Soviet government had declared him persona non grata.

Returning to the U.S., Baker worked in the Bureau of Public Affairs from 1958 to 1960.

He returned to the field in 1960, working in Rome as a political officer and making a study of the Italian Communist Party.

Baker spent 1964 through 1967 working with the United States delegation to the United Nations. Issues confronting the U.S. delegation during this time included the Cyprus dispute (particularly the role of Makarios III as president of Cyprus), the Indo-Pakistani War of 1965, and the Six-Day War.

Baker spent 1967-68 teaching at Harvard University as part of its International Affairs Fellows Program.

From 1968 to 1970, Baker served as Deputy Chief of Mission at the U.S. Embassy, Prague. He thus witnessed first hand The Two Thousand Words, the Warsaw Pact invasion of Czechoslovakia, and the implementation of the Moscow Protocol. Baker returned to the U.S. in 1970, and worked in the Bureau of European Affairs until 1974 with a focus on Eastern European Affairs.

In 1974, Baker accepted an appointment with the United Nations, becoming Director of the United Nations Office of Political Affairs. He held this position until 1977, when he became the U.S. representative to the Food and Agriculture Organization in Rome, a position he held until 1979.

In 1979, Baker became the first Director of the Bureau of Refugee Programs, holding this office from August 26, 1979, until October 30, 1980.

Baker joined the faculty of the National War College and taught there until his retirement in 1986.

Baker has been active in the activities of the Atlantic Council.

== Family life ==
Baker married Sarah Kendall Bragg, a young American. The two had three boys, John Alexander Baker 3, Kendall Vaughan Baker, Andrew Nichols Baker.

Sarah Bragg passed in 1962.

John Baker later married his second wife Katharine Gratwick Baker, the couple went on to have two more boys, Mitchell Gratwick Baker and Malcolm Perkins Baker

== Works by John A. Baker Jr. ==
- John A. Baker, Italian Communism: The Road to Legitimacy and Autonomy (Washington, D.C.: National Defense University Press, 1989).

Government offices
| Preceded by None | Director of the Bureau of Refugee Programs; August 26, 1979 – October 30, 1980 | Succeeded by Frank E. Loy |
