= Under Secretary of State for Civilian Security, Democracy, and Human Rights =

U.S. diplomatic position

United States Under Secretary of State for Civilian Security, Democracy, and Human Rights
- Seal of the United States Department of State
- Incumbent; Vacant since July 14, 2025
- United States Department of State
- Style: The Honorable
- Reports to: The United States Secretary of State
- Seat: Washington, D.C.
- Appointer: The president; with Senate advice and consent
- Term length: No fixed term
- Precursor: Under Secretary of State for Democracy and Global Affairs
- Inaugural holder: Maria Otero
- Formation: January 17, 2012
- Abolished: July 14, 2025
- Superseded by: Under Secretary of State for Foreign Assistance, Humanitarian Affairs, and Religious Freedom
- Salary: Executive Schedule, Level 3
- Website: Official website

The under secretary of state for civilian security, democracy, and human rights was a position within the U.S. Department of State that led the State Department's efforts to prevent and counter threats to civilian security. The under secretary overaw the Bureau of Democracy, Human Rights, and Labor, the Bureau of Conflict and Stabilization Operations, the Bureau of Global Health Security and Diplomacy, the Bureau of Population, Refugees, and Migration, the Office of Global Criminal Justice, and the Office to Monitor and Combat Trafficking in Persons.

Previously known as the under secretary for democracy and global affairs, the position was renamed in 2012, during the Obama administration.

On April 22, 2025, Secretary of State Marco Rubio said that the position would be abolished and renamed the under secretary for foreign assistance, humanitarian affairs, and religious freedom.

== List of under secretaries of state for civilian security, democracy, and human rights ==
#	Name	Assumed office	Left office	President(s) served under
1	Maria Otero	January 17, 2012	February 4, 2013	Barack Obama
2	Sarah Sewall	February 20, 2014	January 20, 2017	Barack Obama
-	Nathan Sales (initially as acting, later as senior official)	September 29, 2017	December 21, 2020	Donald Trump
-	Eric Ueland (as senior official, by designation)	December 21, 2020	January 20, 2021	Donald Trump
-	Lisa J. Peterson (as senior official, by designation)	January 20, 2021	July 14, 2021	Joe Biden
3	Uzra Zeya	July 14, 2021	January 20, 2025	Joe Biden
-	Albert T. Gombis (as senior official, by designation)	January 20, 2025	July 14, 2025	Donald Trump
