= Jaime Otero Calderón =

Bolivian politician and journalist

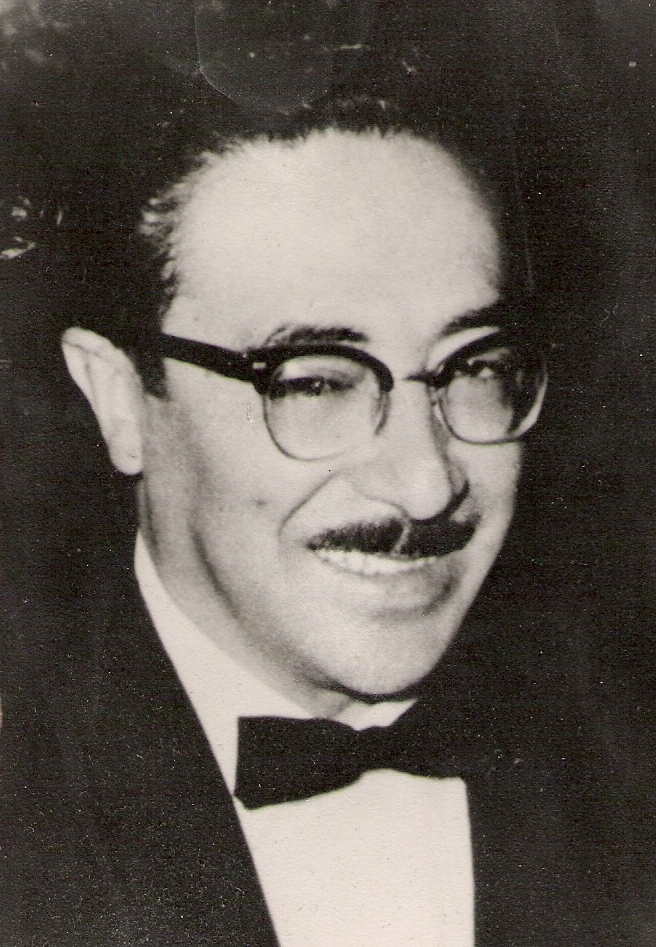
- Otero in 1963
- Born: January 19, 1921; La Paz, Bolivia
- Died: February 15, 1970 (aged 49); La Paz, Bolivia
- Education: Doctor of Law, University of Saint Francis Xavier, 1945
- Political party: Revolutionary Nationalist Movement (MNR)
- Spouse: Rosario Zuazo Precht
- Children: 5

Jaime Otero Calderón (19 January 1921 – 15 February 1970) was a Bolivian congressman, mayor, diplomat, cabinet minister, political leader, intellectual, and journalist.

== Early life ==
Jaime Otero Calderón was born in La Paz, Bolivia, on January 19, 1921. He was the third son of seven children of Alfredo H. Otero Pantoja and Elisa Calderón Salinas. Alfredo H. Otero was an author, congressman, and Minister of Education and the Arts. Jaime Otero Calderón and his brothers attended La Salle catholic school where he was very active in the literary arts. In 1939 he attended engineering school in Santiago, Chile, but became very ill and returned to Bolivia. He obtained a Doctor in Law degree in 1945 from the University of Saint Francis Xavier in Sucre. After seven years of courting Rosario Zuazo Precht, they married in 1949 in La Paz.

== From Camiri to the Cabinet ==
In 1949, Jaime Otero Calderón became legal counsel and administrative manager in the oil fields of Yacimientos Petrolíferos Fiscales Bolivianos (YPFB) in Camiri, Santa Cruz. From 1950 to 1951 he was law professor at the Higher University of San Andrés in La Paz where he taught Constitutional and Roman Law. He was one of the main leaders of the Party of the Pachakutismo, which proposed a moral revolution, and was headed by Fernando Diez de Medina. The Pachakutismo later dissolved and many of its members, Otero among them, joined the growing Revolutionary Nationalist Movement (MNR) that was led by Víctor Paz Estenssoro. In 1951 the MNR won the national elections but their victory was annulled. The revolution of 1952 placed the MNR in power. That year, Otero became deputy secretary at the Ministry of Mines and Oil. From 1953 to 1955, Otero was director and administrator of YPFB. In 1955 he was elected congressman for the La Paz Department. In September 1956, at age 35, he was appointed mayor of the city of La Paz by President Hernán Siles Zuazo. His tenure as mayor was short and difficult. He reported to the Friends of the city, an independent watchdog organization, that the resources of the municipality were barely enough to "pay salaries and buy brooms to sweep the streets", and did not allow him to initiate needed public works. He called for an audit of the municipal purse. He also filed lawsuits against landowners who had expropriated lands belonging to indigenous communities in El Alto, La Paz. He was forced to resign in 1957. From 1957 until 1960 he was counsel and adjunct ambassador at the Embassy of Bolivia in Buenos Aires, Argentina. In 1960 he was appointed president of the Social Security Fund for Oil Workers. From 1962 to 1964 he held the post of Minister of Government and Secretary General of the Presidency during the second and third presidential terms of Victor Paz. Otero also presided over the National Council for Administrative Reform and the National Council of Tourism. After the coup d'état by generals Barrientos and Ovando in November 1964, he sought asylum in the Embassy of Colombia, but did not go into exile.

== Opposition, persecution, and assassination ==
During subsequent years in the opposition, Otero published a weekly newsletter called the Confidential Information Service (SIC). In this publication, he revealed information that he personally received about acts of corruption by government officials.

On March 13, 1969, after being jailed once again for allegedly participating in subversive activities against the government, Otero wrote a letter to the Minister of the Interior, Cap. David Fernández, describing the threat that he received of "extreme measures without reservation" to be taken against him should he continue with the alleged activities. Otero stated that the threat was made by the chief of the Directorate of Criminal Investigation Division, Cap. Tito Vargas. The letter was published in Presencia, a socially conscious newspaper of the catholic church, and the newspaper of the largest circulation in Bolivia at the time. In the letter he denied the accusations and declared "I do not intend to renounce my ideals nor take refuge by switching my political allegiance, instead I will remain as I have until now, firmly loyal and consistent with my principles, and those of my party, and the individuals that represent my political convictions, exercising inalienable natural and constitutional rights". He asked the Minister to absolve him of the charges or submit his case to the courts.

A few weeks before his death he expressed to his wife, Rosario, his grave concern about information that he had received regarding a major state crime that was severely damaging to Bolivia. He said he intended to reveal this information at the proper time. In the early hours of Sunday, February 15, 1970, Otero was brutally murdered inside his family's printing business, the Editorial e Imprenta Artística.

== Publications ==
=== General works ===
- Orígen y Evolución del Capitalismo
- Aplicación de la Reforma Administrativa en Bolivia
- Relaciones Humanas en la Industria Estatal y Privada
- Institucionalización de la Planificación

=== Selected works ===
- Coordinación de la Resistencia Nacionalista (September 1967). Zavaleta Mercado, René; Almaraz Paz, Sergio; Otero Calderón, Jaime; Ibarnegaray Téllez, Raúl; Gutiérrez, María Elba; Rospigliosi Nieto, Félix; Virreira, Sergio; Gironda, Eusebio (eds.). El Nacionalismo Revolucionario Contra la Ocupación Norteamericana. La Paz.
- Otero Calderón, Jaime (September 1968). "Ausencia y presencia de Dios". Cultura Boliviana. 31. Oruro: Universidad Técnica de Oruro.
- Otero Calderón, Jaime (23 November 1968). "Dilucidación Histórica (4 de Noviembre de 1964)". Servicio de Informaciones Confidenciales. Year II (75). La Paz: Imprenta Artística.

It is unknown if prints of this work exist. However, René Zavaleta Mercado considered it the most faithful account of the events inside the presidential palace during the fall of the MNR on November 3rd and 4th of 1964 and transcribed much of this work in his book La Caída del M.N.R. y la Conjuración de Noviembre, which was posthumously dedicated to Otero.
