= Hard Choices (Moore book) =

1998 non-fiction book edited by Jonathan Moore

- Hard Choices
- Author: Jonathan Moore
- Language: English
- Subject: Humanitarianism
- Publisher: Rowman & Littlefield
- Publication date: 1998
- Publication place: United States
- Media type: Print (Paperback)
- Pages: 336
- ISBN: 978-0847690312
- OCLC: 493883959

Hard Choices: Moral Dilemmas in Humanitarian Intervention is a non-fiction compilation book about humanitarianism on the international arena, edited by Jonathan Moore. Noteworthy contributors to the book include: Kofi A. Annan, Rony Brauman, Romeo A. Dallaire, Richard J. Goldstone, J. Bryan Hehir, Michael Ignatieff, Ian Martin, Elizabeth Reid, Mohamed Sahnoun, Mu Sochua, Cornelio Sommaruga, Roger Williamson, and José Zalaquett. It was published in paperback format by Rowman & Littlefield in 1998.

The book received a positive reception from reviews in academic journals including: Foreign Affairs published by the Council on Foreign Relations, Ethics & International Affairs, and International Review of the Red Cross.

== Contents summary ==
Jonathan Moore drew together noteworthy writers to contribute to Hard Choices, including: Kofi A. Annan, Rony Brauman, Romeo A. Dallaire, Richard J. Goldstone, J. Bryan Hehir, Michael Ignatieff, Ian Martin, Elizabeth Reid, Mohamed Sahnoun, Mu Sochua, Cornelio Sommaruga, Roger Williamson, and José Zalaquett. These individuals have backgrounds in humanitarian aid, academia, and global policymaking. The book attempts to analyze international response to humanitarian interventions, and suggest ways to improve these processes.

Hard Choices argues that people on the global stage have modified their thoughts regarding humanitarian interventions after striving to assist in aid to Somalia. World leaders observed that initiatives crafted to help with basic problems and promote stability in the region ended up having unfortunate negative consequences.

Groups wishing to assist in such matters including nongovernmental organizations, the United Nations, and sovereign armies found they were unclear as to the best method to apply to situations where countries require humanitarian aid. These problems, including those derived from economic inequity, are further muddied due to interests of multiple different stakeholders. The authors assert that further resources should be devoted to addressing moral challenges worldwide.

In addition to Somalia, the book addresses humanitarian problems caused by conflicts in Bosnia, Cambodia, Haiti, and Rwanda. Major issues grappled with by the authors include problems caused by international sales in the defense industry, global refugees, international sanctions, economic impact of HIV/AIDS, and human rights. The contributors argue that these complex problems may be mitigated through discussion and analysis motivated by a desire to raise the level of quality involved in choices taken by world leaders during policymaking regarding humanitarian intervention.

== Publication history ==
Hard Choices was sponsored by the International Committee of the Red Cross (ICRC). Jonathan Moore had been asked by the ICRC in 1996 to produce a monograph which would examine issues surrounding humanitarian intervention.

The book was first published in paperback format by Rowman & Littlefield in 1998. It was published in an eBook format in the same year. Rowman & Littlefield released a hardcover edition in 1999.

== Reception ==
Hard Choices was reviewed in the journal Foreign Affairs published by the Council on Foreign Relations. In the review, Eliot A. Cohen observed that the book confronted "uncomfortable truths". Cohen concluded, "Whether medieval politics can control, much less eliminate, medieval brutality is the unanswered question that hangs over this book." The New York Times discussed the work and cited contributors Rony Brauman and Mary B. Anderson in an article about problematic issues surrounding disaster relief.

Ethics & International Affairs published a review of the book by Nicholas Xenos, who wrote: "The practitioners who reflect on their experience here strike a consistent theme: Many difficult decisions had to be made, along with trade-offs between consistent concern for human rights and the desire to provide safety, needs assistance, or developmental aid."

In a review in International Review of the Red Cross, Frédéric Mégret commented: "Hard Choices argues convincingly in favour of a moral pragmatism that rejects any form of extremism." Mégret's review concluded: "Awareness of the existence of ethical challenges is already a step towards taking them into account. In this regard Hard Choices is a remarkably frank attempt to consider the consequences and the shortcomings of humanitarian intervention."

Médecins Sans Frontières USA include the book among their recommended reading for potential field and office staff.

== See also ==
- Assistant Secretary of State for Population, Refugees, and Migration
- Human rights
- Humanism
- Humanitarian aid
- Humanitarian principles
- Jonathan Moore (State Department official)
- Shorenstein Center on Media, Politics and Public Policy
- United States Agency for International Development
- United Nations Economic and Social Council
- World citizen
