= Douglas J. Bennet =

American political official and college president

Douglas Bennet
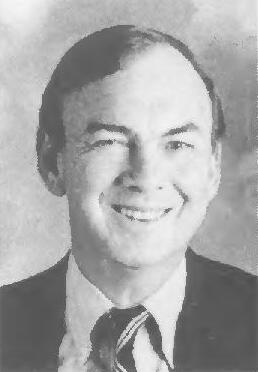
- Bennet in a 1993 publication

15th President of Wesleyan University
- In office July 1, 1995 – June 30, 2007
- Preceded by: William Chace
- Succeeded by: Michael S. Roth

19th Assistant Secretary of State for International Organization Affairs
- In office May 26, 1993 – May 31, 1995
- President: Bill Clinton
- Preceded by: John Bolton
- Succeeded by: Princeton Lyman

7th Administrator of the United States Agency for International Development
- In office August 3, 1979 – January 20, 1981
- President: Jimmy Carter
- Preceded by: John J. Gilligan
- Succeeded by: M. Peter McPherson

15th Assistant Secretary of State for Legislative Affairs
- In office March 18, 1977 – August 2, 1979
- President: Jimmy Carter
- Preceded by: Robert J. McCloskey
- Succeeded by: J. Brian Atwood

Personal details
- Born: Douglas Joseph Bennet Jr. June 23, 1938 Orange, New Jersey, U.S.
- Died: June 10, 2018 (aged 79) Essex, Connecticut, U.S.
- Party: Democratic
- Spouses: Susanne Klejman (m. 1959; div. 1995); Midge Bowen Ramsey (m. 1996)
- Children: 3, including Michael and James
- Education: Wesleyan University (BA); University of California, Berkeley (MA); Harvard University (PhD)

Douglas Joseph Bennet Jr. (June 23, 1938 – June 10, 2018) was an American political official and college president. He was the fifteenth president of Wesleyan University, in Middletown, Connecticut, from 1995 to 2007. Before that, he served as assistant secretary of state for international organization affairs in the Clinton administration (1993–95) and assistant secretary of state for legislative affairs in the Carter administration (1977–79), was the president and CEO of National Public Radio (1983–93), and ran the United States Agency for International Development under President Carter (1979–81).

== Early life and education ==
Born in Orange, New Jersey, to Douglas Joseph Bennet Sr. and Phoebe (Benedict) Bennet, Bennet grew up in Lyme, Connecticut, and attended the local public schools. He earned a bachelor's degree from Wesleyan University in 1959, a M.A. in history from the University of California, Berkeley, in 1960, and a PhD in history from Harvard University in 1968.

== Career ==
He was an assistant to ambassador to India Chester Bowles in the 1960s.

In 1970, he announced his candidacy for the Democratic primary for Connecticut's 2nd congressional district, which was vacated by the death of Congressman William St. Onge, but later withdrew from the race. In 1974, he sought the Democratic nomination for the same seat, but was defeated at the district convention by Christopher Dodd.

He later served on the staffs of Missouri Senator Thomas Eagleton, Minnesota Senator Hubert H. Humphrey, and Connecticut Senator Abraham Ribicoff. In 1977, Bennet became United States assistant secretary of state for legislative affairs.

Bennet succeeded John J. Gilligan as the administrator of the United States Agency for International Development in 1979, where he served for two years. After heading a private research institute, he was named head of NPR in 1983. In 1993, President Bill Clinton named Bennet as assistant secretary of state for international organization affairs, where he served until 1995.

In April 1995, Bennet succeeded William Chace, becoming the fifteenth president of Wesleyan University.

On May 4, 2006, Bennet announced that he would step down as president following the 2006–2007 academic year. The last several years of his twelve-year presidency were contentious in some respects, with opposition by a minority in the student body on certain matters. Some students believed Bennet's fundraising priorities conflicted with the interests and needs of the student body and the university's educational mission. A student movement came to a head in December 2004, when approximately 250 students (of more than 2,700 undergraduates) protested in front of the administrative building South College, where Bennet's office was located, demanding that he address student concerns. On March 26, 2007, Wesleyan's board of trustees announced that Michael S. Roth would succeed Bennet as president for the 2007–2008 academic year.

== Awards ==
In 1994, Bennet received an honorary doctor of laws degree from Wesleyan; in 2008, he received an honorary doctor of laws degree from Trinity College. In 2011, Bennet was named a fellow of the American Academy of Arts and Sciences. In 2012, a residence hall in the Fauver Frosh housing complex at Wesleyan was renamed Bennet Hall in honor of former President Bennet.

== Personal ==
On June 27, 1959, Bennet married Susanne Klejman of Washington, D.C. They have three children, Michael, James, and Holly. They divorced in 1995. In 1996 he married Midge Bowen Ramsey, a vice president at National Public Radio.

Bennet died at his home in Essex, Connecticut, on June 10, 2018, at the age of 79. His health had declined after a fall he sustained five years prior.

Political offices
Preceded by Robert J. McCloskey	Assistant Secretary of State for Legislative Affairs; 1977–1979	Succeeded by J. Brian Atwood
Preceded by John J. Gilligan	Administrator of the United States Agency for International Development; 1979–1981	Succeeded by M. Peter McPherson
Preceded by John Bolton	Assistant Secretary of State for International Organization Affairs; 1993–1995	Succeeded by Princeton Lyman
