= Richard Devine (disambiguation) =

Richard Devine may refer to:

- Richard A. Devine, former State's Attorney for Cook County, Illinois
- Richard Devine, Atlanta-based electronic musician

== See also ==
- Richard David Vine, U.S. diplomat
