= The Connect U.S. Fund =

U.S. nonprofit organization

Connect U.S. Fund
- Abbreviation: CUSF
- Formation: 2004; 22 years ago
- Founders: William and Flora Hewlett Foundation; Charles Stewart Mott Foundation; Open Society Institute; Rockefeller Brothers Fund
- Dissolved: 2013; 13 years ago
- Headquarters: Washington, D.C.
- Affiliations: Tides Center

The Connect U.S. Fund (CUSF) was a Washington, D.C.–based nonprofit that promotes responsible U.S. global engagement in issues like nuclear nonproliferation, human rights, climate change, and development. It was founded in 2004 by several foundations and shut down in 2013. The organization supported grantees and other non-governmental organizations in their efforts to collaborate, engage policy makers, and bring issues to the attention of the media. Its last President was Nancy Soderberg.

== History ==
The Connect U.S. initiative was founded in 2004 by the William and Flora Hewlett Foundation, Charles Stewart Mott Foundation, Open Society Institute, and Rockefeller Brothers Fund to unite and support a growing number of U.S.-based organizations that work on international affairs. The Ford Foundation joined the collaborative in 2005, the Atlantic Philanthropies joined in 2008, the Ploughshares Fund joined in 2009, and the Carnegie Corporation of New York joined in 2010. The Connect U.S. Fund operated as a project of the Tides Center.

The initiative had emerged from a series of meetings among the founding partners in 2002 and 2003 when they discovered that they faced similar challenges, such as "limited public and private resources for foreign policy advocacy, media focus on a narrowly defined security agenda, and the absence of informed and empowered constituencies on global issues to hold policy makers accountable". The foundations agreed that "a collaborative fund, to which each would contribute, might provide an important incentive to collaboration among NGOs, and thereby enhance the collective impact of advocacy efforts. They thus created the Connect U.S. Fund and embarked on two rounds of grantmaking, from 2004 through 2006."

In November 2006, Eric P. Schwartz joined the Connect U.S. Fund as its first executive director. He developed a program of grant-making and operations designed to promote a vision of responsible U.S. global engagement during the 2008 U.S. presidential election. In early 2009, Eric Schwartz left to join the U.S. State Department as the Assistant Secretary of State for Population, Refugees, and Migration, and Ambassador Nancy Soderberg joined the Connect U.S. Fund as its new President. She served until it shut down in 2013.

== Overview ==
The Connect U.S. Fund was managed and administered by the Tides Center. The Connect U.S. Council provided policy and program guidance for the Connect U.S. initiative, and was composed of representatives from each of the supporting foundations. The Council was supported by the Connect U.S. Fund professional staff and operated as a project of the Tides Center.

Through a program of grant-making and operations designed to foster stronger collaboration among non-governmental organizations active on foreign policy issues, the Connect U.S. Fund sought to advance a vision for responsible U.S. global engagement in an increasingly interdependent world. The Fund supported a community of foundations and non-governmental organizations working together to enhance the effectiveness of their collective advocacy efforts.

=== Key issues ===
In 2012, the Connect U.S. Fund was focusing on four key issues:

- Human rights: Encourage strong American leadership in multilateral human rights instruments and institutions, including support for the work of the International Criminal Court; strengthening UN human rights mechanisms; securing ratification of at least one “core” human rights treaty; and a U.S. government structure to prevent genocide and respond to mass atrocities.
- Climate change: Urge U.S. leadership in addressing the climate crisis through making smart investments at home and in the developing world and by promoting innovative solutions for reducing emissions. This includes eliminating all fossil fuel subsidies and galvanizing investment in adaptation, clean technology, and forest protection in the developing world.
- Development: Support for international financial and trade reform as a means for global poverty alleviation, including U.S. support for international financial transparency, international financial institution reform, trade preference reform, and export-led growth in the developing world, ensuring U.S. civilian agencies have the funds, capacity, and knowledge needed to conduct development, stability operations, and diplomacy effectively in order to strike a better balance between the civilian and military responsibilities in these areas.
- Security: U.S. support for arms control treaties, a fissile material cut-off, and efforts to secure vulnerable nuclear materials
