= Ellen Sauerbrey =

American politician (born 1937)

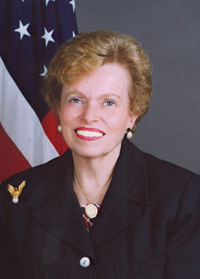

11th Assistant Secretary of State for Population, Refugees, and Migration
- In office January 4, 2006 – December 31, 2007
- President: George W. Bush
- Preceded by: Gene Dewey
- Succeeded by: Eric P. Schwartz

Member of the Maryland House of Delegates from the 10th district
- In office January 12, 1983 – January 11, 1995 Serving with Wade Kach, Thomas Chamberlain, Bob Ehrlich
- Preceded by: Thomas Kernan; Mark Medairy; Donald Hughes
- Succeeded by: Emmett C. Burns Jr.; Shirley Nathan-Pulliam; Joan Neverdon Parker

Member of the Maryland House of Delegates from the 5B district
- In office January 10, 1979 – January 12, 1983 Serving with Richard Matthews
- Preceded by: George Price
- Succeeded by: Lawrence LaMotte

Personal details
- Born: Ellen Richmond; September 9, 1937 (age 88) Baltimore, Maryland, U.S.
- Party: Republican
- Spouse: Wil Sauerbrey (m. 1959)
- Education: McDaniel College (BA)
- Website: Official blog

Ellen Richmond Sauerbrey (born September 9, 1937) is an American politician from Maryland and the former head of the United States Department of State's Bureau of Population, Refugees, and Migration. She was nominated to the Bureau in September 2005 by President George W. Bush. On January 4, 2006, Bush placed her in office by way of a recess appointment, bypassing the need for Senate confirmation. Her confirmation was unlikely, given strong objections by some senators. Sauerbrey's recess appointment caused some controversy; however, her experience as minority leader in the Maryland House of Delegates and managing a complex U.S. Census project helped rally others to her cause. After her tenure in the house of delegates, she ran for governor of Maryland in 1994 and 1998 as the Republican nominee, losing both elections to Democrat Parris Glendening.

== Life and career ==
Sauerbrey was born in Baltimore, Maryland, the only child of Ethel, a secretary/stenographer, and Edgar Richmond, a steelworker for Bethlehem Steel at Sparrows Point. She is a 1955 graduate of Towson High School and a 1959 graduate of Western Maryland College, and was a teacher before entering politics. In 1959, she married Wilmer J.E. Sauerbrey, who is credited with having introduced her to conservative politics.

From 1978 to 1994, she was a Republican member of the Maryland House of Delegates, and served as minority leader from 1986 to 1994. Her committee assignments included the Appropriations Committee; Subcommittee on Education and Transportation; Ways and Means and Economic Matters.

In 1990, she was elected as the national chairwoman of the American Legislative Exchange Council, serving in 1991 when President George H. W. Bush spoke to the organization.

Sauerbrey ran unsuccessfully for Governor of Maryland twice, in 1994 and 1998. She was defeated by Democrat Parris Glendening both times, the first time by a very narrow margin. The 1994 election was in doubt as charges of voter fraud led to a lawsuit by the Sauerbrey campaign to overturn the election, which was ultimately unsuccessful.

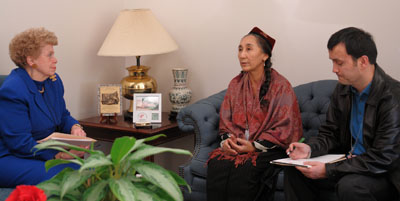
Sauerbrey meeting Rebiya Kadeer (center), President of the International Uyghur Human Rights and Democracy Foundation, and Alim Seytoff (right), General Secretary of the Uyghur Human Rights Project, 2006.

In 2002, George W. Bush nominated Sauerbrey to be Representative to the United Nations Commission on the Status of Women, of the Economic and Social Council of the United Nations, with the rank of Ambassador. In that post, Sauerbrey focused mostly on three issues: the need for more education for women, the importance of empowering women economically and politically, and protection of the right to life.

In January 2006, while the Senate was recessed, President Bush appointed Sauerbrey as Assistant Secretary of State for Population, Refugees, and Migration. It was reported then that this and other such appointments would end at the conclusion of the congressional session in January 2007.

In a January 15, 2007, hearing before the Senate Judiciary Committee, Democratic lawmakers and advocates for refugees called for increased help for fleeing Iraqis. Sauerbrey said a UN-predicted wave of refugees did not occur right after the U.S.-led invasion of Iraq and was instead occurring at that present time.

Sauerbrey was inducted into the Maryland Women's Hall of Fame in 2013 and has written opinion articles published by The Washington Times as recently as 2017.

In November 2020, amid attempts to overturn the U.S. presidential election, Sauerbrey expressed no regrets about challenging her 1994 election outcome, saying, "I think when you have a pretty good indication that the election is rigged, you should fight". Sauerbrey also questioned the transparency, accuracy, and timeliness involved with counting mail-in ballots.

== Bibliography ==
- Inexpert Selection, The New York Times, October 11, 2005
- Democrats Zero In On Another Nominee The Washington Post, October 26, 2005
- Confirm Ellen Sauerbrey The Washington Times, October 25, 2005
- Sisterhood V. Sauerbrey National Review Online, November 14, 2005

Party political offices
Preceded by William Shepard	Republican nominee for Governor of Maryland; 1994, 1998	Succeeded by Bob Ehrlich
Political offices
Preceded by Gene Dewey	Assistant Secretary of State for Population, Refugees, and Migration; 2006–2007	Succeeded by Samuel Witten; Acting
