= Warren Zimmermann =

American diplomat

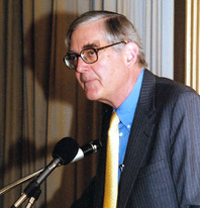
- Warren Zimmermann speaking at the Library of Congress in October 2002.

21st United States Ambassador to Yugoslavia
- In office July 11, 1988 – May 16, 1992
- President: Ronald Reagan; George H. W. Bush
- Preceded by: John Douglas Scanlan

7th Director of the Bureau of Refugee Programs
- In office June 15, 1992 – March 3, 1994
- Preceded by: Princeton Lyman
- Succeeded by: Phyllis E. Oakley

Personal details
- Born: November 16, 1934 Philadelphia, Pennsylvania, U.S.
- Died: February 3, 2004 (aged 69) Great Falls, Virginia, U.S.
- Profession: Diplomat

Warren Zimmermann (November 16, 1934 – February 3, 2004) was an American career diplomat best known as the last US ambassador to SFR Yugoslavia before its disintegration in a series of civil wars.

== Career ==
Warren Zimmermann served in Moscow (1973–75 and 1981–84), Paris, Caracas and Vienna, where he headed the US delegation at the Conference on Security and Cooperation in Europe (1986–89). But it was Yugoslavia that marked him more than any other phase in his professional life, and brought him to prominence.

=== Bosnian War ===
Zimmermann played an active diplomatic and geopolitical role during the initial stages of the Bosnian War.

It has been alleged, likely originally by Nikolaos Stavrou in 1994, that at a supposed meeting between Zimmermann and Bosnian Muslim leader Alija Izetbegović on 28 March 1992 Zimmerman encouraged Izetbegović to repudiate the Carrington–Cutileiro plan; however there is no evidence that such a meeting took place and substantial evidence that it did not.

As the Bosnian conflict developed into a full war during spring 1992, Zimmermann supported the policy of foreign military interventionism.

According to journalist Samantha Power, the author of A Problem from Hell: America and the Age of Genocide, Zimmermann's career in Yugoslavia was marked by "frustration with the resistance of the Bush administration to intervene". His last official act before he was recalled to the United States on 16 May 1992, was to write a confidential memo called "Who Killed Yugoslavia?" to the secretary of state. Each of the five sections of the memo was headed by a verse from the poem "Who Killed Cock Robin?". In Zimmermann's analysis, the nationalism of the Balkan leaders had led to the demise of the country.

Zimmermann resigned from the diplomatic service in 1994 in protest at President Bill Clinton's reluctance to intervene in the Bosnian War. He campaigned to persuade the U.S. that it must act to end what he reportedly saw to be "Serbian aggression in the killing fields of Bosnia" and was of the opinion that "NATO air strikes against the Serbs at any point during the war would have stopped the war and brought a negotiated agreement".

Zimmermann went on to teach at Johns Hopkins University (1994–96) and Columbia University (1996–2000), and spoke out against human rights violations.

Zimmermann wrote an account of his experiences in Yugoslavia, The Origins Of A Catastrophe (1996). According to what he wrote in the book, Franjo Tuđman claimed that Bosnia should be divided between the Croats and the Serbs in the Milošević–Tuđman Karađorđevo meeting. "Tuđman admitted that he discussed these fantasies with Milošević, the Yugoslav Army leadership and the Bosnian Serbs," writes Zimmerman, "and they agreed that the only solution is to divide up Bosnia between Serbia and Croatia".

== Works ==
External videos
- Presentation by Zimmermann on First Great Triumph, October 24, 2002, C-SPAN
- Booknotes interview with Zimmermann on First Great Triumph, January 19, 2003, C-SPAN

Following his ambassadorship in Yugoslavia, Zimmermann authored two books: Origins of a Catastrophe: Yugoslavia and Its Destroyers — America's Last Ambassador Tells What Happened and Why, published in 1996, and First Great Triumph: How Five Americans Made Their Country a World Power, a work about Theodore Roosevelt, Henry Cabot Lodge, John Hay, Elihu Root, and Admiral Alfred T. Mahan, published in 2002.

== Personal life ==
Zimmermann was a member of the Yale Class of 1956, and a member of Scroll and Key Society. He died of pancreatic cancer at his home in Great Falls, Virginia on February 3, 2004.

== Bibliography ==
- First Great Triumph: How Five Americans Made Their Country a World Power (Farrar, Straus and Giroux, 2004). ISBN 0-374-52893-4

Diplomatic posts
Preceded by John Douglas Scanlan	United States Ambassador to Yugoslavia; 1988–1992	Succeeded by William Dale Montgomery
Government offices
Preceded by Princeton N. Lyman	Director of the Bureau of Refugee Programs; June 15, 1992 – March 3, 1994	Succeeded by Phyllis E. Oakley
