= Marijuana Justice Act =

2019 proposed bill in the United States

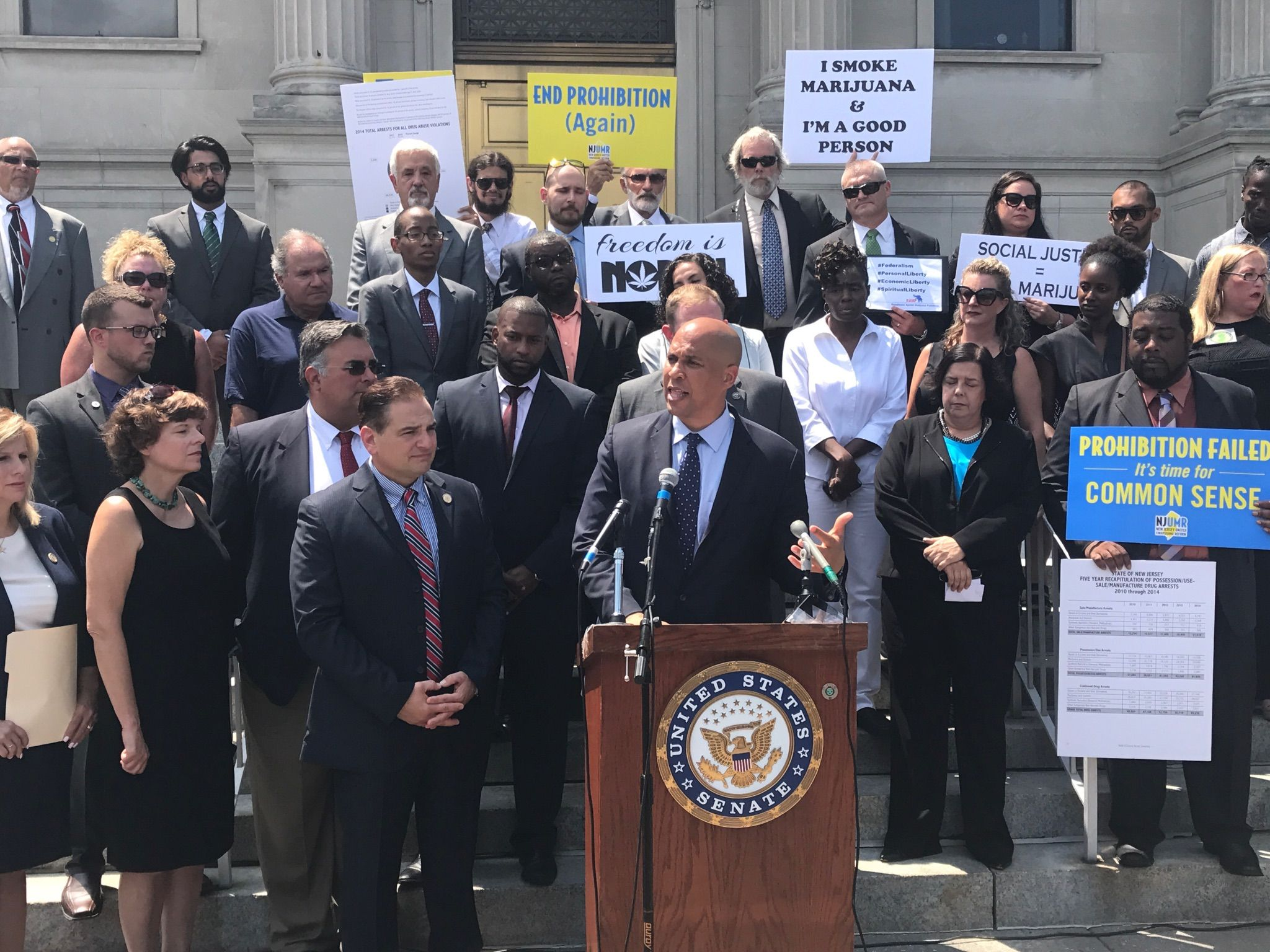
Senator Cory Booker at a rally in support of the Marijuana Justice Act in August 2017

The Marijuana Justice Act (S.1689) was a 2017 bill to remove cannabis from the Controlled Substances Act, sponsored by U.S. Senator Cory Booker. An identical bill, H.R.4815, was introduced in the House of Representatives. The bill was reintroduced in 2019 and co-sponsored by a number of contenders for the Democratic Party's nomination for U.S. President in the 2020 election, including Kamala Harris, Elizabeth Warren, Kirsten Gillibrand, Michael Bennet, and Bernie Sanders. In February 2019, it was referred to the Committee on the Judiciary. The bill introduced by Senator Booker in the 2017–2018 Congress was called "among the most notable efforts" around legalization in that session. Besides removing cannabis from the Controlled Substances Act, the bill also sought to set up a community reinvestment fund, provide for expungement of past drug convictions, and penalize states that enforce cannabis laws disproportionately (regarding race or income status).

== Legislative history ==
- 115th Congress (2017–2018): H.R. 4815 and S. 1689
- 116th Congress (2019–2020): H.R. 1456 and S. 597
