= Anne C. Richard =

American diplomat

Anne Richard
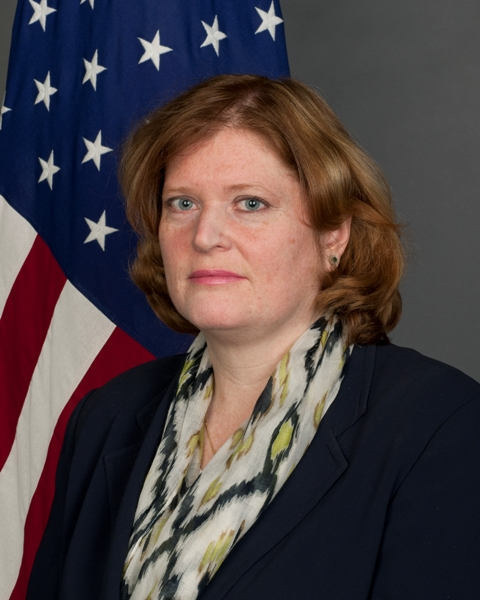

13th Assistant Secretary of State for Population, Refugees, and Migration
- In office April 2, 2012 – January 20, 2017
- President: Barack Obama
- Preceded by: Eric Schwartz
- Succeeded by: Julieta Valls Noyes (2022)

Personal details
- Born: 1960 (age 65–66)
- Education: Georgetown University (BA); University of Chicago (MPP)

Anne Claire Richard (born 1960) is an American former diplomat and leader of refugee and human rights organizations who served as the Assistant Secretary of State for Population, Refugees, and Migration from 2012 to 2017. From October 2021 to June 2024, Richard was a Distinguished Fellow and co-founder of the Afghanistan Human Rights Coordination Mechanism at Freedom House.

== Biography ==
A native of Riverhead, New York, Anne C. Richard is a graduate of Georgetown University (B.S. in Foreign Service) and the University of Chicago (M.A. in Public Policy Studies).

In 1984, she became a Presidential Management Intern and was hired by the U.S. Office of Management and Budget. She lived in West Germany 1985–86 as a fellow of the Robert Bosch Foundation but returned to OMB afterwards. She joined the State Department in 1990. She was a fellow of the Council on Foreign Relations from 1993 to 1994 and during this time helped to create the International Crisis Group.

She served as an Advisor in the United States Deputy Secretary of State's Office of Policy and Resources at the State Department. She spent 1997 to 1999 as deputy chief financial officer of the Peace Corps. She was Director of the State Department Office of Resources, Plans and Policy from 1999 to 2001.

Leaving government service in 2001, she later became vice president of government relations and advocacy at the International Rescue Committee (2004–2012).

President Barack Obama nominated her to be Assistant Secretary of State for Population, Refugees, and Migration and after Senate confirmation, she was sworn in on April 2, 2012. Upon completion of her government service, Richard taught or lectured at several universities, including the Walsh School of Foreign Service at Georgetown, Perry World House at the University of Pennsylvania, Hamilton College, and the Miller Center at the University of Virginia. In October 2021, she joined Freedom House as a Distinguished Fellow and Afghanistan Coordination Lead. She stepped down at the end of June 2024.

She is married and has two grown children.

Political offices
Preceded by Eric Schwartz	Assistant Secretary of State for Population, Refugees, and Migration; 2012–2017	Succeeded by Simon Henshaw; Acting
