= James N. Purcell Jr. =

American author and diplomat (1938–2024)

James N. Purcell Jr

7th Director General of the International Organization for Migration
- In office 1 October 1988 – 30 September 1998
- Preceded by: James L. Carlin
- Succeeded by: Brunson McKinley

4th Director of the Bureau of Refugee Programs
- In office June 12, 1983 – September 28, 1986
- Preceded by: Richard David Vine
- Succeeded by: Jonathan Moore

Personal details
- Born: 1938 Nashville, Tennessee, U.S.
- Died: January 5, 2024 (aged 85–86)
- Education: Furman University; Syracuse University (MPA)

James N. Purcell Jr. (1938 – January 5, 2024) was an American writer and diplomat who wrote "We're in Danger! Who Will Help Us? Refugees and Migrants: A Test of Civilization" (2019). The book is a history of events and teamwork among members of the U.S. Refugee Programs Bureau and its protection and resettlement programs, domestic and with international cooperation. It includes data and commentary on U.S. refugee policies from bygone eras up to the Fall of Saigon, then to the war in Syria that dispersed populations in-country, regionally, and worldwide. After retiring from IOM, Purcell returned to the United States and served until 2022 as board chair of USA for IOM.

Purcell was United States Director of the Bureau of Refugee Programs from 1983 to 1986, a bureau whose design and implementation he was assigned to create in 1979 and where he stayed until leaving for Geneva, Switzerland in 1988, to become director-general of the International Organization for Migration, an office he held for two terms – from 1988 to 1998.

== Biography ==
James N. Purcell Jr. was born in Nashville, Tennessee, in 1938 and raised in Tennessee and Florida. He was educated at Furman University and was awarded a fellowship to Maxwell School of Citizenship and Public Affairs at Syracuse University, where he earned the M.P.A. In 2019, Maxwell awarded Jim the Alumni Award.

Purcell worked in public affairs for his entire career, serving in every presidential administration from John F. Kennedy to Ronald Reagan. After serving in the Office of Management and Budget, he moved to the United States Department of State in 1978. There, he worked in management before being assigned to U.S. refugee and immigration policy related to the Indochinese refugees, as well as refugees of other humanitarian disasters.

In 1983, President of the United States Ronald Reagan nominated Purcell as Director of the Bureau of Refugee Programs, and he held this office from June 12, 1983, to September 28, 1986.

In 1988, Purcell became Director General of the International Organization for Migration in Geneva, a post he held until 1998, having been re-nominated by Bill Clinton and reelected. Among awards he received while at the International Organization for Migration (IOM) were The Order of the Phoenix (Greece) and Wings of Hope (USAIM).

From 1998, he worked as an adviser for foreign governments dealing with refugee crises.

Purcell died on January 5, 2024, at the age of 85.

== Sources ==
- Profile from Council for a Community of Democracies
- Open Library Profile

Government offices
Preceded by Richard David Vine	Director of the Bureau of Refugee Programs; June 12, 1983 – September 28, 1986	Succeeded by Jonathan Moore
