= James Bennet (journalist) =

American journalist and former editorial editor for the New York Times

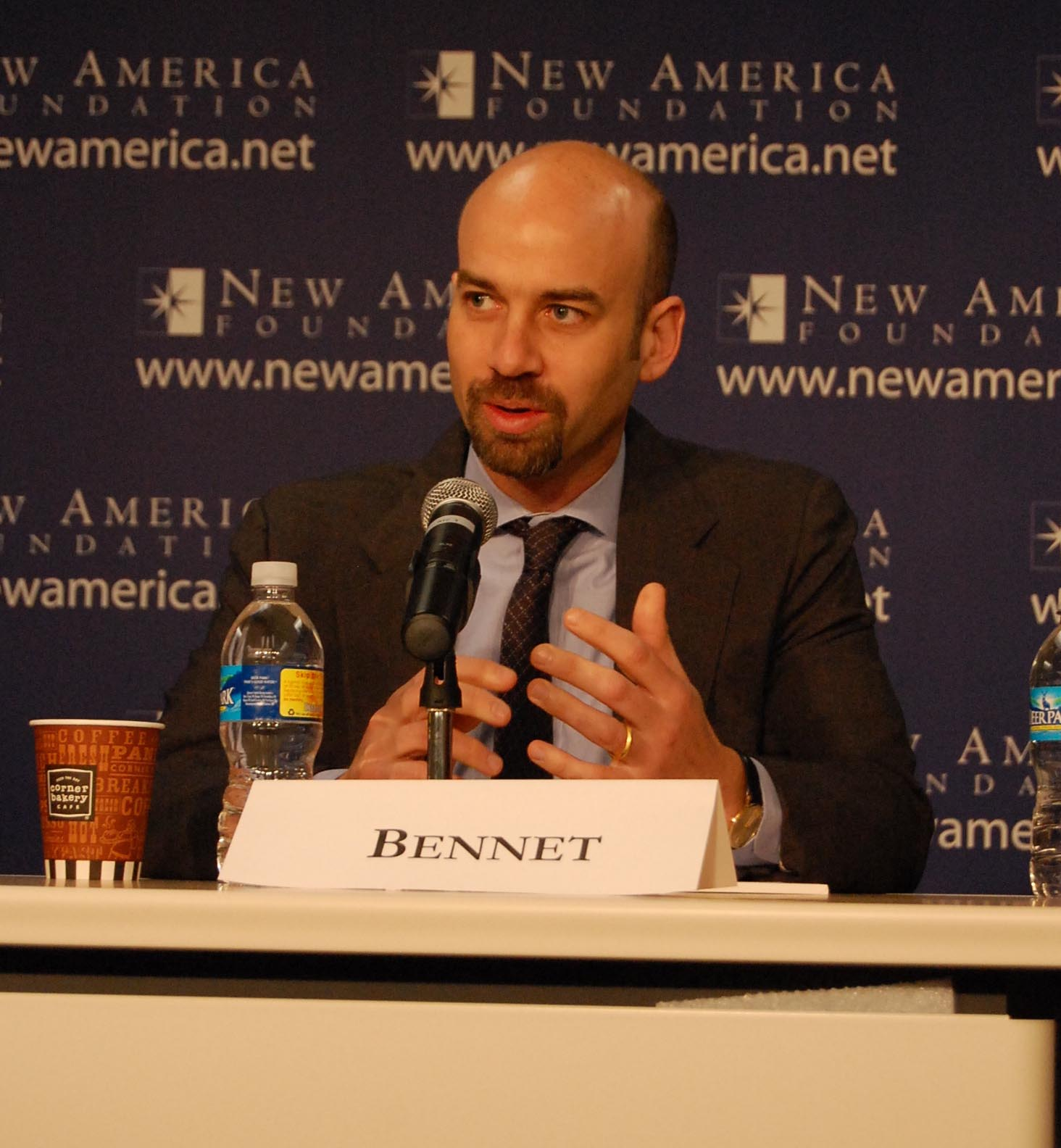
- Bennet at New America discussion in 2009
- Born: James Douglas Bennet; March 28, 1966 (age 60); Boston, Massachusetts, U.S.
- Education: Yale University (BA)
- Occupation: Journalist
- Years active: 1989–present
- Employers: The Washington Monthly (1989–1991); The New York Times (1991–2006; 2016–2020); The Atlantic (2006–2016); The Economist (2021–present)
- Spouse: Sarah Jessup (m. 2001)
- Children: 2
- Relatives: Douglas J. Bennet (father); Michael Bennet (brother)

James Douglas Bennet (born March 28, 1966) is an American journalist. He is a senior editor for The Economist, and writes the Lexington column for the magazine. He was editor-in-chief of The Atlantic from 2006 to 2016 and was the editorial page editor at The New York Times from May 2016 until his forced resignation in June 2020. He is the younger brother of U.S. Senator Michael Bennet.

== Early life and education ==
James Bennet was born in Boston, Massachusetts, the son of Susanne (Klejman) and political official Douglas J. Bennet. He has a brother and sister. His mother is a Polish Jewish immigrant, who survived the Holocaust. When his father joined the staff of Sen. Thomas F. Eagleton, the family moved to Washington, D.C., where James attended the St. Albans School. Susanne Bennet taught English as a second language at Language ETC, a non-profit organization in Washington. James Bennet studied at Yale University, where he earned a Bachelor of Arts degree and was editor-in-chief of The New Journal.

Bennet's elder brother is Michael Bennet, who has served as U.S. senator from Colorado since 2009. James Bennet was opinion editor at The New York Times when Michael Bennet ran for president in 2020; James Bennet agreed to recuse himself from all coverage of the 2020 presidential race.

== Career ==
Bennet began his career in journalism as an intern for The News & Observer and The New Republic. From 1989 to 1991, he held an editing post at The Washington Monthly. He joined The New York Times in 1991. He rose to serve as a White House correspondent and Jerusalem Bureau Chief. Upon his return from Jerusalem, he wrote a memorandum on the proper usage of the terms "terrorist" and "terrorism", which is often cited by editors of The Times.

Bennet was due to become the Times's Beijing correspondent in late 2006. He resigned from the paper in March of that year to accept an offer to become the 14th editor-in-chief of The Atlantic. Bennet was selected by the magazine's publisher, David G. Bradley, following an exhaustive selection process. Bradley conferred with 80 journalists around the United States.

As an editor, Bennet attracted attention in April 2008 when the magazine featured a cover story on Britney Spears, a change from The Atlantic's tradition in higher culture. The issue did poorly in newsstand sales.

During his tenure, The Atlantic dramatically increased web traffic, and in 2010, the magazine had its first profitable year in a decade.

=== The New York Times ===
In March 2016, The New York Times announced Bennet's appointment as Editorial Page editor, effective May 2, 2016. Bennet immediately added op-ed columnist Bret Stephens to the Times' editorial page, whose first column cast doubt on the long term consequences of climate change, resulting in reports of subscription cancellations.

In June 2017, the editorial page published a piece that linked political incitement to the Congressional baseball shooting as well as the 2011 mass shooting in Arizona that wounded then-Rep. Gabby Giffords. The piece cited SarahPAC's map of targeted electoral districts as targeting individual Democratic politicians. These parts of the piece were later retracted, but in response, Sarah Palin (the founder of SarahPAC) filed a defamation lawsuit against The New York Times. Bennet was called to testify in response to Palin's lawsuit. Palin's suit was dismissed in 2017, only to be reinstated in 2019. On February 8, 2022, Bennet testified and took full responsibility for the errors published. A few days later, on February 15, 2022, a jury rejected Palin's libel suit against the Times.

==== Cotton op-ed and resignation ====
On June 3, 2020, amid nationwide protests and riots against racism and police brutality in the wake of the murder of George Floyd, The New York Times published a number of op-eds about the protests. Some op-eds called for more protests, one called for the abolition of the police, and one by Republican Senator Tom Cotton of Arkansas, titled "Send in the Troops", called for the deployment of federal troops into major American cities if there was violent rioting. Bennet stated that the Times had invited Cotton to write an op-ed after he tweeted about using troops to stop rioting. Fellow editorial writer Michelle Goldberg called the piece "fascist." Dozens of Times reporters tweeted, "Running this puts Black @NYTimes staff in danger." Bennet initially defended the publication of the op-ed.

On June 4, 2020, The New York Times published a story titled, "New York Times Says Senator’s Op-Ed Did Not Meet Standards." Bennet stated that the Times story on the op-ed falsely reported that Cotton's op-ed "called to send the military to suppress protests against police violence," as Cotton had distinguished between peaceful protestors and rioters and looters. The Times announced Bennet's resignation on June 7, 2020.

In December 2023, Bennet wrote a 16,000 word essay in The Economist, referencing extensive email correspondence, stating that his ousting came despite private support for publishing the op-ed from The New York Times leadership, including publisher A.G. Sulzberger and executive editor Dean Baquet. Bennet said that old guard Times journalists who valued "fairness, pluralism and political independence" capitulated to their younger colleagues, who used the paper to push "liberal viewpoints and shun conservative perspectives". On the news website Semafor, Bennet accused Sulzberger of betrayal, writing "He set me on fire and threw me in the garbage and used my reverence for the institution against me." Bennet states that the original goal of the Times was to present unbiased reporting of the news and viewpoints from across the political spectrum. He argues that the Times has become a much more illiberal organization that presents news and opinions that agree with those of its left-of-center readership base.

=== The Economist ===
On January 26, 2021, The Economist hired Bennet as a "visiting senior editor" for one year. In July 2022, as a senior editor at the magazine, he became the first American to be writer of The Economist's Lexington column, named for the site of the first battle of the American Revolution.

== Personal life ==
In 2001, he married Sarah Jessup in a civil ceremony. The couple has two sons.

Media offices
Preceded by Michael Kelly	Editor-in-chief of The Atlantic; March 2, 2006 – March 14, 2016	Succeeded by Jeffrey Goldberg
Preceded by Andrew Rosenthal	Editorial Director of The New York Times; May 2, 2016 – June 7, 2020	Succeeded by Kathleen Kingsbury
