= Michael Bennet =

American politician (born 1964)

- Bennet in 2026

United States Senator from Colorado
- Incumbent
- Assumed office January 21, 2009 Serving with John Hickenlooper
- Preceded by: Ken Salazar

Chair of the Democratic Senatorial Campaign Committee
- In office January 3, 2013 – January 3, 2015
- Leader: Harry Reid
- Preceded by: Patty Murray
- Succeeded by: Jon Tester

Superintendent of Denver Public Schools
- In office July 1, 2005 – January 21, 2009
- Preceded by: Jerome Wartgow
- Succeeded by: Tom Boasberg

Personal details
- Born: Michael Farrand Bennet; November 28, 1964 (age 61) New Delhi, India
- Party: Democratic
- Spouse: Susan Daggett (m. 1997)
- Children: 3
- Parent: Douglas J. Bennet (father)
- Relatives: James Bennet (brother)
- Education: Wesleyan University (BA); Yale University (JD)
- Website: Senate website Campaign website
- Bennet's voice Bennet questions witnesses on hemp production for farmers. Recorded February 1, 2023

Michael Farrand Bennet (born November 28, 1964) is an American attorney and politician serving as the senior United States senator from Colorado, a seat he has held since 2009. A member of the Democratic Party, he was appointed to the seat when Senator Ken Salazar became Secretary of the Interior. He previously served as chief of staff to Denver mayor (and his future Senate colleague) John Hickenlooper, and superintendent of Denver Public Schools.

Bennet is the son of Douglas J. Bennet, a former State Department official and president of Wesleyan University. Early in his career, Bennet worked for Ohio governor Richard Celeste. He received a Juris Doctor degree from Yale Law School, worked as a law clerk, and was counsel to the U.S. deputy attorney general during the administration of Bill Clinton.

Bennet served then-Mayor Hickenlooper as his chief of staff from 2003 to 2005 and became superintendent of the Denver public school system in July 2005. Governor Bill Ritter appointed Bennet to fill the U.S. Senate seat vacated by Ken Salazar when Salazar became Secretary of the Interior in January 2009. Bennet was elected in the 2010 Senate election, defeating Republican nominee Ken Buck. He chaired the Democratic Senatorial Campaign Committee (DSCC) for the 2014 cycle. Bennet became Colorado's senior senator in 2015, after Mark Udall was defeated. He was reelected to the Senate in 2016 and 2022.

On May 2, 2019, Bennet announced his candidacy for the Democratic nomination for president of the United States. He dropped out of the race on February 11, 2020, after a poor showing in the New Hampshire primary. Bennet ran for governor of Colorado in 2026, but lost the Democratic primary to Attorney General Phil Weiser. Bennet is set to become the dean of Colorado's congressional delegation when Representative Diana DeGette leaves office in 2027.

== Early life and education ==
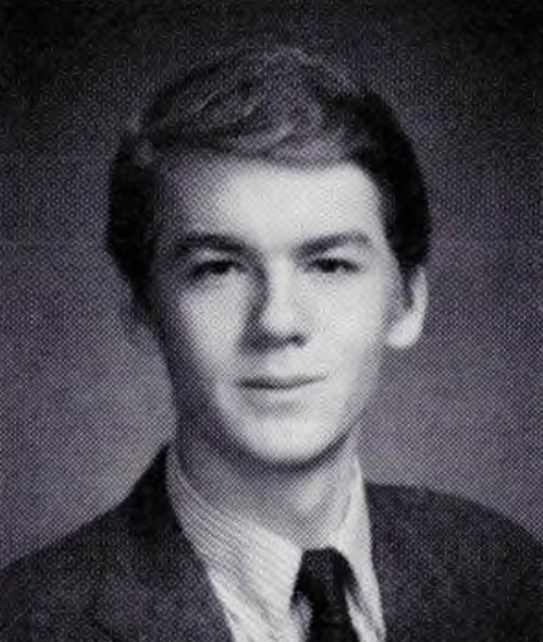
Bennet in the Wesleyan University yearbook, 1987

Bennet was born in New Delhi, India. His mother is Susanne Christine Bennet (née Klejman), a retired elementary school librarian and Jewish Holocaust survivor who was born in 1938 in Warsaw, Poland, and immigrated to the United States with her family in 1950. Her parents survived imprisonment in the Warsaw Ghetto. His father was Douglas J. Bennet, who was born in New Jersey, and served as an aide to Chester Bowles, then the U.S. ambassador to India. Douglas Bennet ran the United States Agency for International Development under President Jimmy Carter, served as president and the CEO of National Public Radio (1983–93), and as Assistant Secretary of State for International Organization Affairs in the Clinton administration (1993–95). His grandfather Douglas Bennet was an economic adviser in Franklin D. Roosevelt's administration.

Bennet grew up in Washington, D.C.; his father served as an aide to Vice President Hubert Humphrey, among other politicians. He was held back in second grade because of his dyslexia. He enrolled at St. Albans School, an elite all-boys preparatory school, and served as a page on Capitol Hill.

In 1987, Bennet earned his Bachelor of Arts in history from Wesleyan University, the alma mater of his father and grandfather. At Wesleyan he was a member of Beta Theta Pi. In 1993, Bennet earned his Juris Doctor from Yale Law School, where he was the editor-in-chief of the Yale Law Journal.

== Early career ==
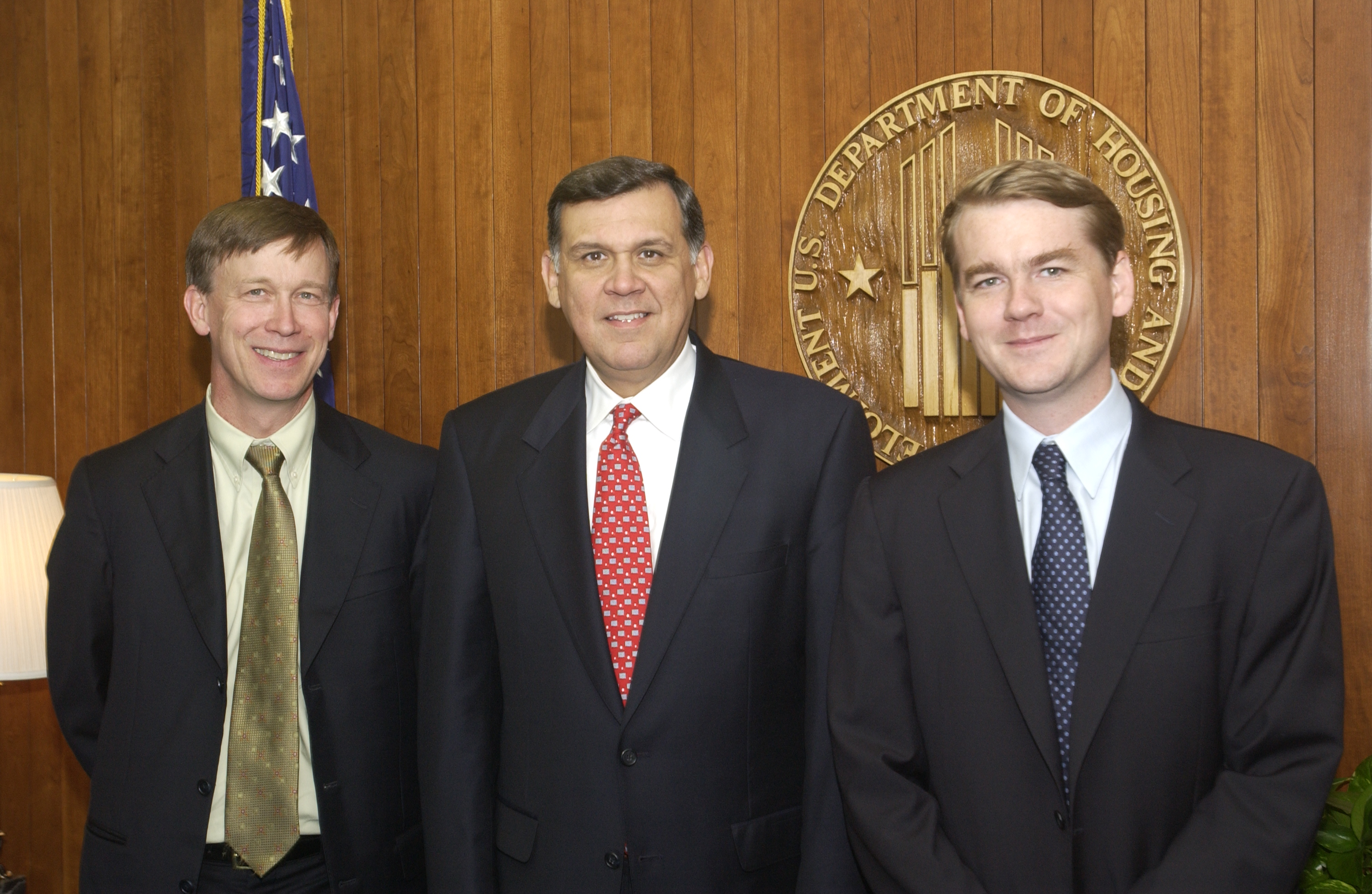
Bennet (right) with then-mayor John Hickenlooper and Secretary of Housing and Urban Development Mel Martinez in 2003

From 1988 until 1990, when he left to attend Yale, he served as an aide to Ohio governor Richard Celeste. After law school he served as a law clerk for the 4th Circuit Court of Appeals and as an associate to Washington, D.C. attorney Lloyd Cutler. He then served as counsel to the Deputy Attorney General during the Bill Clinton administration. His father, Douglas Bennet, worked in the Clinton Administration as well, as Assistant Secretary of State for International Organization Affairs. Following a stint as an assistant to the U.S. Attorney for the District of Connecticut, Bennet moved west. After briefly living in Montana, he moved with his fiancée to Colorado in 1997. Bennet worked for six years in Denver as managing director for the Anschutz Investment Company, where he led the reorganization of an oil company and helped consolidate three movie theater chains into the Regal Entertainment Group.

While working for Anschutz, Bennet befriended fellow Wesleyan alumnus John Hickenlooper, informally advising the latter's successful campaign for mayor of Denver. Moving back into public service, Bennet served for two years as Hickenlooper's Chief of Staff.

The Denver Board of Education selected Bennet as superintendent of Denver Public Schools on June 27, 2005, and he took office on July 1. He had no experience as a school administrator. Under Bennet's leadership, the Denver Public School system grew student enrollment, decreased dropout rates, and improved graduation rates and college enrollment. Those trends have continued since Bennet left the office. Bennet collaborated with educators and community members to develop the Denver Plan, a commitment to increase student success by focusing on higher expectations, better professional learning opportunities for educators, and deeper engagement with the community and stakeholders. Bennet and the City of Denver also partnered with private philanthropists to increase college enrollment and affordability for DPS graduates. The Denver Post said of his tenure, "Bennet has been a force—pushing reforms and steering the state's second-largest district to a culture of success."

In 2008, Bennet persuaded the Denver Board of Education to enter into a 30-year, $750 million financial bond transaction with variable interest rates designed to fluctuate as economic conditions changed. According to The New York Times, "In short order, the transaction went awry because of stress in the credit markets, problems with the bond insurer and plummeting interest rates." As of 2010 the school system had paid $115 million in interest and other fees, at least $25 million more than it originally anticipated.

Bennet was among the many officials whose names were circulated for United States Secretary of Education in the Obama administration, a position eventually filled by Arne Duncan. He and his wife were early Obama supporters during the 2008 Democratic primaries, and he was among those who advised Obama on education issues.

== U.S. Senate (2009–present) ==
=== Appointment ===
On January 3, 2009, Bennet was named by Colorado governor Bill Ritter to fill the seat in the United States Senate vacated by Interior Secretary Ken Salazar on January 20. Ritter chose Bennet after interviewing several prominent Colorado Democrats, and Bennet took the job with the blessing of Hickenlooper. Upon taking office on January 21, 2009, Bennet became the youngest senator in the 111th Congress for five days, until the appointment of Senator Kirsten Gillibrand, and he said he would seek election at the end of Salazar's term in 2010.

In his January 2011 article in Time titled "Shaking Schools Up in an Already Tumultuous Year", Andrew J. Rotherham said of Bennet: "If the federal No Child Left Behind Act is modified this year, or if anything else of significance happens in Washington on education policy, this Colorado Democrat will be at the center of it."

=== Elections ===
==== 2010 ====
County results of the 2010 race

Bennet ran for election for a full term as senator from Colorado in the 2010 election. On September 16, 2009, former Colorado House Speaker Andrew Romanoff announced his campaign to challenge Bennet for the Democratic nomination. Bennet received endorsements from President Obama, U.S. Senator Mark Udall, and U.S. Representatives Betsy Markey, Jared Polis, and John Salazar of the Colorado congressional delegation. He raised $7 million and had a four-to-one cash advantage over Romanoff.

On August 10, 2010, Bennet defeated Romanoff in the primary and won his party's nomination. He faced Republican nominee Ken Buck. The campaign became one of the most expensive in the country, with the candidates spending a reported $15 million combined, and outside groups another $30 million. Bennet portrayed Buck as an extremist conservative opposed to abortion and direct election of senators, while Buck and the groups supporting him characterized Bennet as a big-spending liberal.

On November 3, the day after polls closed, Bennet was declared the winner and Buck conceded. Bennet won by 851,590 votes (48.1%) to 822,731 (46.4%). He subsequently returned to Washington, D.C. in January 2011 to start a full six-year term. After the election, Obama said Bennet "perfectly reflects the qualities of the ruggedly independent state he has been chosen to serve."

==== 2016 ====
County results of the 2016 race

Bennet was reelected to a second term on November 8, 2016, defeating the Republican nominee, El Paso County Commissioner Darryl Glenn. Bennet received 50% of the vote to Glenn's 44%. Following the election, President Obama said Bennet was one of the "gifted Democratic politicians" who could lead the party in the future.

==== 2022 ====
Bennet was reelected to a third term in 2022, defeating the Republican nominee, businessman Joe O'Dea, who was notably critical of former President Donald Trump. Bennet received 55.9% of the vote to O'dea's 41.3%. This was the first Senate election in which Bennet received a majority of the vote.

=== Tenure ===
During the 2018–2019 federal government shutdown, Bennet engaged in a heated debate with Ted Cruz on the Senate floor, railing against him and attacking him for causing the 2013 government shutdown.

In the wake of the 2021 storming of the United States Capitol, Bennet called for the 25th amendment of the U.S. Constitution to be invoked to remove Trump from office. In 2024, Bennet was one of the first Democratic senators to publicly state that he worried President Joe Biden would lose the presidential race to Donald Trump, saying, "Donald Trump is on track, I think, to win this election, and maybe win it by a landslide, and take with him the Senate and the House. So for me, this isn't a question about polling. It's not a question about politics. It's a moral question about the future of our country."

In May 2025, a pro-Palestinian protest was held in Denver against Bennet and Jason Crow.

=== Committee assignments ===
- Committee on Agriculture, Nutrition and Forestry
  County results of the 2022 race
  - Subcommittee on Conservation, Forestry and Natural Resources (Chair)
  - Subcommittee on Rural Development and Energy
- Committee on Finance
  - Subcommittee on Energy, Natural Resources, and Infrastructure
  - Subcommittee on International Trade, Customs, and Global Competitiveness
  - Subcommittee on Taxation and IRS Oversight
- Committee on Rules and Administration
- Select Committee on Intelligence

Source: United States Senate

== 2020 presidential campaign ==
Michael Bennet 2020 presidential campaign
- Campaign: U.S. presidential election, 2020
- Candidate: Michael Bennet; U.S. Senator from Colorado (2009–present)
- Affiliation: Democratic Party
- Launched: May 2, 2019
- Suspended: February 11, 2020
- Headquarters: Denver, Colorado
- Receipts: US$6,853,752.77 (December 31, 2019)
- Slogan: "Building Opportunity Together"

Website
- michaelbennet.com (archived - January 7, 2020)

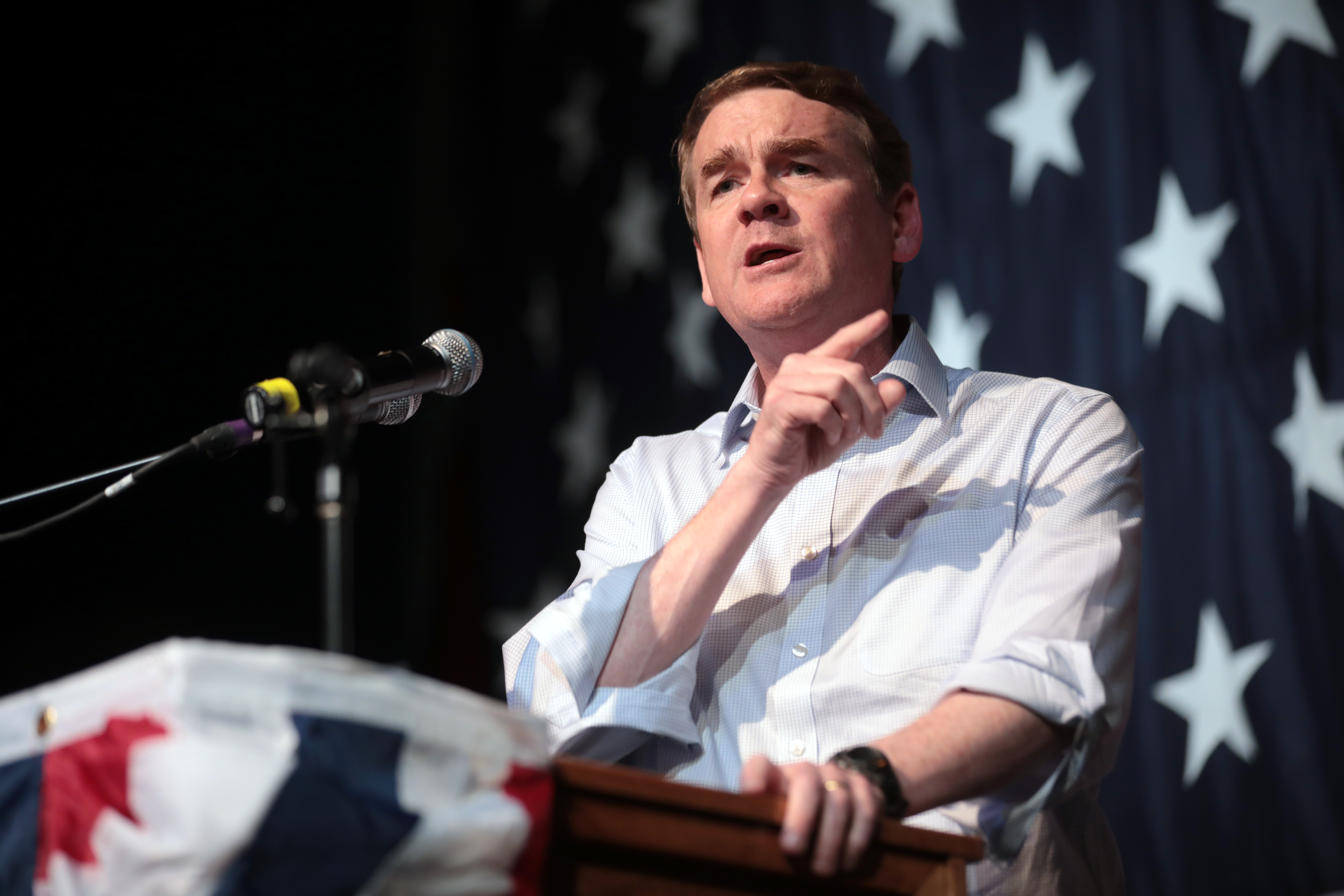
Bennet speaking at the 2019 Iowa Democratic Wing Ding in August 2019

Bennet's 2020 presidential campaign began on May 2, 2019, when he officially declared his candidacy during an appearance on CBS This Morning. Bennet was previously mentioned as a possible presidential candidate following his viral response to Senator Ted Cruz in January 2019. In February and March 2019 he traveled to early primary states such as Iowa and New Hampshire. In late March Bennet said he was "very inclined" to run for the presidency.

Following his announcement, Bennet campaigned in Iowa on May 5 and 11 and South Carolina on May 31. He qualified for the first set of debates on June 3, and appeared in the June 27 debate, receiving 8.1 minutes of airtime. He appeared in the second set of debates, on July 26 and 27, this time receiving 10.6 minutes of airtime. He failed to qualify for the remainder of the debates. He also failed to qualify for the Iowa and New Hampshire debate, making him the candidate to fail to qualify for a debate the most times (six).

Bennet received 164 votes in the Iowa caucuses, and 958 in the New Hampshire primary.His best performances were in Alabama, Mississippi, and Louisiana, where he garnered 2.31% of the vote, his best result. He had already dropped out on February 11, 2020, the night of the New Hampshire primary.

== 2026 Colorado gubernatorial campaign ==
On April 11, 2025, less than halfway through his third U.S. Senate term, Bennet announced his candidacy in the 2026 Colorado gubernatorial election to succeed term-limited Governor Jared Polis. He joined Colorado Attorney General Phil Weiser in the Democratic primary. Super PACs supporting Bennet spent millions of dollars on the race, and Michael Bloomberg spent $750,000. Weiser defeated Bennet in the June 30 primary by about 13 percentage points.

== Political positions ==
The American Conservative Union gave Bennet a 6% lifetime conservative rating in 2020. In 2023, the Lugar Center ranked Bennet in the top third of senators for bipartisanship.

=== Abortion ===
Bennet supports abortion rights and has voted to continue federal funding to Planned Parenthood. After Roe v. Wade was overturned in June 2022, Bennet said that the "radical majority on the Supreme Court demolished fifty years of precedent" and called it an "activist decision".

=== Agriculture ===
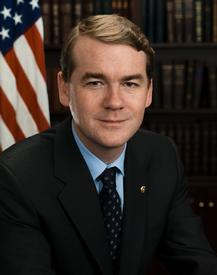
Bennet during the 111th Congress

In March 2019, Bennet was one of 38 senators to sign a letter to Secretary of Agriculture Sonny Perdue warning that dairy farmers "have continued to face market instability and are struggling to survive the fourth year of sustained low prices" and urging his department to "strongly encourage these farmers to consider the Dairy Margin Coverage program."

=== Cannabis ===
Bennet cosponsored the bipartisan STATES Act, proposed in the 115th Congress by Senators Elizabeth Warren and Cory Gardner, which would exempt individuals or corporations in compliance with state cannabis laws from federal enforcement of the Controlled Substances Act. He also cosponsored the SAFE Banking Act in 2019, which would provide marijuana businesses with access to banking services.

In 2018, Bennet criticized the Trump administration for attempting to cherry-pick data to misinform the public on marijuana use. In response, the White House's Office of National Drug Control Policy committed to be completely objective and dispassionate in its analysis of marijuana.

Bennet cosponsored the Marijuana Freedom and Opportunity Act in 2018 and the Marijuana Justice Act in 2019, a pair of bills that would legalize cannabis at the federal level by removing it from the Controlled Substances Act. He opposed Colorado's Amendment 64 to legalize cannabis in 2012.

=== Economic policy ===
In December 2019, Bennet and Senator Mitt Romney proposed a child allowance.

=== Energy policy ===
In 2009, Bennet co-sponsored the Solar Manufacturing Jobs Creation Act, a bill that would have provided a tax credit to support solar manufacturing in the U.S. The legislation was not enacted.

He was one of the handful of Democratic senators who have supported construction of the Keystone XL pipeline, voting for it in 2013, 2014, and 2015.

In February 2021, Bennet was one of seven Democratic senators to join Republicans in blocking a ban of hydraulic fracturing, commonly known as fracking.

=== Environmental policy ===
In October 2017, Bennet was one of 19 senators to sign a letter to Environmental Protection Agency Administrator Scott Pruitt questioning Pruitt's decision to repeal the Clean Power Plan, asserting that Pruitt used "mathematical sleights of hand to overstate the costs of industry compliance with the 2015 Rule and understate the benefits that will be lost if the 2017 repeal is finalized", and that science denial and math tricks fail to "satisfy the requirements of the law, nor will it slow the increase in frequency and intensity of extreme weather events, the inexorable rise in sea levels, or the other dire effects of global warming that our planet is already experiencing."

In November 2018, Bennet was one of 25 Democratic senators to cosponsor a resolution in response to findings of the Intergovernmental Panel On Climate Change report and National Climate Assessment. The resolution affirmed the senators' acceptance of the findings and their support for bold action to address climate change.

In March 2019, Bennet was an original cosponsor of a bipartisan bill intended to mandate that the Environmental Protection Agency declare per- and polyfluoroalkyl substances as hazardous substances that can be addressed with cleanup funds via the EPA Superfund law and require that polluters undertake or pay for remediation within a year of the bill's enaction.

In April 2019, Bennet was one of 12 senators to sign a bipartisan letter to top senators on the Appropriations Subcommittee on Energy and Water Development advocating that the Energy Department be granted maximum funding for carbon capture, utilization and storage (CCUS), arguing that American job growth could be stimulated by investment in capturing carbon emissions and expressing disagreement with President Trump's 2020 budget request to combine the two federal programs that do carbon capture research.

In September 2019, Bennet was one of eight senators to sign a bipartisan letter to congressional leadership requesting full and lasting funding of the Land and Water Conservation Act in order to aid national parks and public lands, benefit the $887 billion American outdoor recreation economy, and "ensure much-needed investment in our public lands and continuity for the state, tribal, and non-federal partners who depend on them."

Bennet was a member of the Senate Democrats' Special Committee on the Climate Crisis, which published a report of its findings in August 2020.

=== Foreign policy ===
In July 2017, Bennet co-sponsored the Israel Anti-Boycott Act (s. 720), which permits U.S. states to enact laws that require contractors to sign a pledge saying they will not boycott goods from Israel, or their contracts will be terminated.

In March 2018, Bennet voted against tabling a resolution spearheaded by Senators Bernie Sanders, Chris Murphy, and Mike Lee regarding U.S. involvement in the Saudi-led intervention in the Yemeni civil war that would have required Trump to withdraw U.S. troops either in or influencing Yemen within the next 30 days unless they were combating Al-Qaeda.

In November 2018, Bennet joined Senators Chris Coons, Elizabeth Warren, and a bipartisan group of lawmakers in sending the Trump administration a letter raising concerns about the People's Republic of China's undue influence on media outlets and academic institutions in the United States. They wrote: "In American news outlets, Beijing has used financial ties to suppress negative information about the CCP. In the past four years, multiple media outlets with direct or indirect financial ties to China allegedly decided not to publish stories on wealth and corruption in the CCP. In one case, an editor resigned due to mounting self-censorship in the outlet's China coverage. Beijing has also sought to use relationships with American academic institutions and student groups to shape public discourse."

In April 2019, Bennet was one of 34 senators to sign a letter to Trump about cutting aid to Central America. It encouraged Trump "to listen to members of your own Administration and reverse a decision that will damage our national security and aggravate conditions inside Central America," asserting that Trump had "consistently expressed a flawed understanding of U.S. foreign assistance" since becoming president and that he was "personally undermining efforts to promote U.S. national security and economic prosperity" by preventing the use of Fiscal Year 2018 national security funding. The senators argued that foreign assistance to Central American countries created less migration to the U.S. by helping to improve conditions in those countries.

=== Government shutdown ===
On January 24, 2019, Bennet gave an impromptu 25-minute speech on the Senate floor in response to comments by Senator Ted Cruz. He questioned the authenticity of Cruz's concern about difficulties that the 2018–19 government shutdown was causing to first responders, recalling that in 2013 Cruz led a shutdown that lasted 16 days at a time when Colorado was experiencing flooding. In less than eight hours the speech became the most-watched Senate floor speech in C-SPAN history.

=== Gun law ===
As of 2022, Bennet has an "F" grade from the NRA Political Victory Fund. This has fallen from a "C+" grade in 2010. In 2012, Bennet joined then Colorado Senator Mark Udall in asking for stricter gun control, in response to the Sandy Hook Elementary School shooting. After the shooting, Bennet said, "In Colorado, we support the 2nd Amendment right to bear arms, we support the ability of people to hunt and recreate and to protect their families and homes, and we want to keep the wrong weapons out of the hands of the wrong people."

Bennet participated in the Chris Murphy gun control filibuster, demanding that gun laws be changed in the wake of the Orlando nightclub shooting. During his participation in the filibuster, Bennet talked about the 2012 Aurora, Colorado, shooting, citing that as a response to the shooting, the state of Colorado closed gun sale loopholes and now requires background checks for any gun purchase.

In response to the 2017 Las Vegas shooting, Bennet demanded universal background checks regarding gun sales and described the shooting as domestic terrorism.

In 2013, Bennet voted against a Senate Amendment 711 to S. 649 (The Safe Communities, Safe Schools Act of 2013), an amendment introduced by Dianne Feinstein that would have reinstated the federal assault weapons ban. The amendment was defeated 40–60 with one Republican, Mark Kirk, voting in favor and 16 Democrats (including independent Senator Angus King, who caucuses with Democrats) against. Also in 2013 Bennet voted to strengthen the background check system and to ban high-capacity magazines.

Bennet owns a shotgun, which he has called a "hunting shotgun".

=== Health care policy ===
Bennet voted in support of the Patient Protection and Affordable Care Act (Obamacare) signed by President Barack Obama on March 23, 2010. In November 2009, when the bill was still working its way through Congress, Bennet said that he would support health care reform even if it meant losing the election. In 2016, describing the healthcare costs in western and central Colorado as among the highest in the United States, Bennet said he "didn't have answers" and called it "next to impossible" to fix the Affordable Care Act given partisan attitudes at that time.

As part of a group of Democrats proposing "more incremental steps to broaden health care coverage", as opposed to Bernie Sanders's push for "Medicare for All", Bennet and Senator Tim Kaine have proposed "Medicare X". Medicare X would "create a public option modeled after Medicare alongside private options on the ObamaCare marketplaces". In 2019 Bennet and Kaine reintroduced the latest version of the plan, which would also "expand access to tax credits."

In January 2019 during the 2018–19 United States federal government shutdown, Bennet was one of 34 senators to sign a letter to Commissioner of Food and Drugs Scott Gottlieb recognizing the efforts of the FDA to address the shutdown's effect on public health and employees while remaining alarmed "that the continued shutdown will result in increasingly harmful effects on the agency's employees and the safety and security of the nation's food and medical products."

In April 2019 Bennet and Senator Chuck Grassley's Advancing Care for Exceptional (ACE) Kids Act, legislation that creates an option for states and families to provide improved coordination of care for children with complex medical conditions, was signed into law.

=== Immigration policy ===
In September 2009, Bennet cosponsored the DREAM Act (S. 729), which proposed amending the Illegal Immigration Reform and Immigrant Responsibility Act of 1996 by giving residency to immigrants enrolled in higher education programs or serving in the military. In 2013, he was a member of the Gang of Eight, a bipartisan group of four Democratic and four Republican U.S. senators who introduced comprehensive immigration reform legislation. Their bill, the Border Security, Economic Opportunity, and Immigration Modernization Act of 2013, passed the U.S. Senate with a vote of 68–32, but stalled in the House due to opposition from the Republican majority. He later cosponsored the Dream Act of 2017. After President Trump ended the Deferred Action for Childhood Arrivals (DACA) program, Bennet worked with a bipartisan group of senators to provide a pathway to citizenship for Dreamers with stronger border protections.

In August 2018, Bennet was one of 17 senators to sign a letter spearheaded by Kamala Harris to Homeland Security Secretary Kirstjen Nielsen demanding that the Trump administration take immediate action in attempting to reunite 539 migrant children with their families, citing each passing day of inaction as intensifying "trauma that this administration has needlessly caused for children and their families seeking humanitarian protection."

In June 2019, Bennet and six other Democratic senators led by Senator Brian Schatz sent letters to the Government Accountability Office and the suspension and debarment official and inspector general at the US Department of Health and Human Services citing recent reports that showed "significant evidence that some federal contractors and grantees have not provided adequate accommodations for children in line with legal and contractual requirements" and urged the officials to determine whether federal contractors and grantees are in violation of contractual obligations or federal regulations and should thus face financial consequences.

In July 2019, following reports that the Trump administration intended to cease protecting spouses, parents and children of active-duty service members from deportation, Bennet was one of 22 senators led by Tammy Duckworth to sign a letter arguing that the protection gave service members the ability "to fight for the United States overseas and not worry that their spouse, children, or parents will be deported while they are away" and that its termination would both cause service members personal hardship and negatively affect their combat performance.

Also in July 2019, Bennet and 15 other Senate Democrats introduced the Protecting Sensitive Locations Act, which would require, except in special circumstances, that ICE agents get approval from a supervisor before engaging in enforcement actions at sensitive locations, and that agents receive annual training in addition to reporting annually on enforcement actions in those locations.

=== LGBT rights ===
Bennet supports same-sex marriage. He lauded the Supreme Court's 2015 decision in Obergefell v. Hodges that legalized same-sex marriage nationwide, stating on his Senate website "Marriage is a fundamental right that same-sex couples deserve to enjoy, and now they will have the same rights and opportunities that the law grants to Susan [Bennet's spouse] and me."

Bennet is the author of legislation to direct resources to improve the sexual health of older Americans, including LGBTQ+ and rural senior populations. He is an original co-sponsor of the Equality Act. In 2022, Bennet voted for the Respect for Marriage Act.

== Personal life ==
On October 26, 1997, Bennet married Earthjustice Legal Defense Fund attorney Susan Diane Daggett, in Marianna, Arkansas. They have three daughters and reside in Denver's Congress Park neighborhood.

Though not raised in an observant household, Bennet acknowledges his Jewish roots. He has said that he was "raised with two different heritages, one [that] was Jewish and one [that] was Christian," and that he believes in God.

His brother, James Bennet, was the editorial page director for The New York Times.

On April 3, 2019, Bennet announced he had been diagnosed with prostate cancer and underwent surgery later that month. Following the surgery, Bennet's office said the procedure was "completely successful" and that he requires no further treatment.

As of 2019, according to Forbes Magazine, Bennet's net worth was $15 million.

== Electoral history ==
Year	Office	Party	Primary			General				Result	Swing	Ref.
Year	Office	Party	Total	%	P.	Total	%	±%	P.	Result	Swing	Ref.
2010	U.S. Senator	Democratic	184,714	54.15%	1st	854,685	48.08%	–3.22	1st	Won	Hold	
2016	U.S. Senator	Democratic	262,344	100.0%	1st	1,370,710	49.97%	+1.89%	1st	Won	Hold	
2022	U.S. Senator	Democratic	516,985	100.0%	1st	1,397,170	55.9%	+5.91%	1st	Won	Hold	
2026	Governor	Democratic	380,128	43.2%	2nd	N/A	N/A	N/A	N/A	Lost	N/A	

== See also ==
- List of United States senators born outside the United States

Educational offices
Preceded by Jerome Wargow	Superintendent of Denver Public Schools; 2005–2009	Succeeded by Tom Boasberg
U.S. Senate
Preceded by Ken Salazar	United States Senator (Class 3) from Colorado; 2009–present Served alongside: Mark Udall, Cory Gardner, John Hickenlooper	Incumbent
Honorary titles
Preceded by Mark Pryor	Baby of the Senate; 2009	Succeeded by Kirsten Gillibrand
Party political offices
Preceded by Ken Salazar	Democratic nominee for U.S. Senator from Colorado (Class 3); 2010, 2016, 2022	Most recent
Preceded by Patty Murray	Chair of the Democratic Senatorial Campaign Committee; 2013–2015	Succeeded by Jon Tester
U.S. order of precedence (ceremonial)
Preceded by Jim Risch	Order of precedence of the United States as United States Senator	Succeeded by Kirsten Gillibrand
Preceded by Jeff Merkley	United States senators by seniority 23rd	Succeeded by Kirsten Gillibrand
