= 1998 Maryland gubernatorial election =

- November 3, 1998
- Turnout: 60.59% ▼0.08%

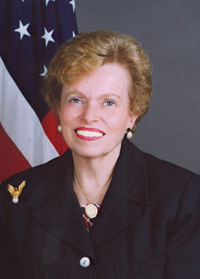
Nominee	Parris Glendening	Ellen Sauerbrey
Party	Democratic	Republican
Running mate	Kathleen Kennedy Townsend	Richard D. Bennett
Popular vote	846,972	688,357
Percentage	55.14%	44.82%
- County results Glendening: 50–60% 60–70% 70–80% 80–90% Sauerbrey: 50–60% 60–70%
Governor before election
Parris Glendening
Democratic
Elected Governor
Parris Glendening
Democratic

The 1998 Maryland gubernatorial election was held on November 3, 1998 to elect the governor and lieutenant governor of Maryland. Democratic incumbent Parris Glendening was re-elected to a second term in office over Ellen Sauerbrey in a rematch of the 1994 election. Glendening defeated Sauerbrey by a much larger margin than he had in 1994.

Glendening easily won the Democratic primary after defeating several candidates. Sauerbrey also easily won her party's nomination.

Despite the controversial nature of the previous election, Governor Glendening comfortably beat back Sauerbrey's spirited challenge, winning his second and final term as governor. As of 2024, this was the last time that Allegany County voted Democratic in a gubernatorial election and the last time that the lieutenant gubernatorial nominee of the winning ticket was not a person of color.

== Democratic primary ==
=== Candidates ===
- Lawrence K. Freeman, Lyndon LaRouche activist and perennial candidate
- Parris Glendening, incumbent governor of Maryland since 1995
- Terence McGuire, physician
- Eileen M. Rehrmann, Harford County Executive

==== Withdrew ====
- Ray Schoenke, insurance executive and retired professional football player

=== Results ===
Democratic primary results
Party	Candidate	Votes	%
Democratic	Parris Glendening (inc.)	296,863	70.09
Democratic	Eileen M. Rehrmann	56,806	13.41
Democratic	Terence McGuire	46,124	10.89
Democratic	Lawrence K. Freeman	23,752	5.61
Total votes		423,545	100.00

== Republican primary ==
=== Candidates ===
- Charles I. Ecker, Howard County Executive
- Ellen Sauerbrey, former state delegate from Baldwin and 1994 nominee for governor

Republican primary results
Party	Candidate	Votes	%
Republican	Ellen Sauerbrey	175,633	81.03
Republican	Charles I. Ecker	41,126	18.97
Total votes		216,759	100.00

== General election ==
=== Candidates ===
- Parris Glendening, incumbent governor of Maryland since 1995 (Democratic)
- Ellen Sauerbrey, former state delegate from Baldwin and 1994 nominee for governor (Republican)

=== Polling ===
Poll source	Date(s) administered	Sample size (Note: Key: A – all adults RV – registered voters LV – likely voters V – unclear)	Margin of error	Parris Glendening (D)	Ellen Sauerbrey (R)	Other / undecided (Note: Calculated by taking the difference of 100% and all other candidates combined.)
Mason-Dixon Polling & Strategy	October 26–28, 1998	827 (LV)	± 3.5%	44%	43%	13%
Potomac Survey Research (Note: Poll sponsored by The Baltimore Sun)	October 23–25, 1998	1,205 (LV)	± 2.8%	52%	44%	4%
ABC News/The Washington Post	October 18–22, 1998	919 (LV)	± 3.0%	49%	44%	7%
Harris Insights & Analytics	October 20, 1998	911	—	42%	55%	3%
Mason-Dixon Polling & Strategy	October 15–17, 1998	821 (LV)	± 3.5%	46%	44%	10%
Potomac Survey Research	September 29 – October 3, 1998	1,204 (LV)	± 3.0%	45%	47%	8%
Mason-Dixon Polling & Strategy	September 18–20, 1998	804 (LV)	± 3.5%	45%	44%	11%
Potomac Survey Research	September 3–7, 1998	1,204 (LV)	± 2.8%	45%	44%	11%
Mason-Dixon Polling & Strategy	July 16–18, 1998	847 (LV)	± 3.5%	48%	41%	11%
Potomac Survey Research	July 9–13, 1998	1,204 (LV)	± 2.8%	44%	38%	18%
Washington Post	June 11–17, 1998	1,055 (RV)	± 3.0%	50%	38%	12%
Mason-Dixon Polling & Strategy	April 2–5, 1998	803 (LV)	± 3.5%	45%	41%	14%
Mason-Dixon Polling & Strategy	January 14–16, 1998	801 (LV)	± 3.5%	43%	40%	17%
Mason-Dixon Polling & Strategy	July 17–19, 1997	805 (RV)	± 3.5%	42%	45%	13%
Mason-Dixon Polling & Strategy	January 7–10, 1997	803 (RV)	± 3.3%	44%	37%	19%

=== Results ===
Maryland gubernatorial election, 1998
Party	Candidate	Votes	%	±%
Democratic	Parris Glendening (inc.)	846,972	55.14%	+4.93%
Republican	Ellen Sauerbrey	688,357	44.82%	−4.97%
Write-ins		649	0.04%	
Majority		158,615	10.33%	+9.90%
Turnout		1,535,978		
Democratic hold		Swing		

== Notes ==
Partisan clients
