= Eric P. Schwartz =

American Assistant Secretary of State

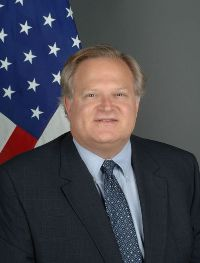

12th Assistant Secretary of State for Population, Refugees, and Migration
- In office July 8, 2009 – October 11, 2011
- President: Barack Obama
- Preceded by: Ellen Sauerbrey
- Succeeded by: Anne C. Richard

Personal details
- Born: 1957 (age 68–69)
- Education: Binghamton University (BA); Princeton University (MPA); New York University (JD)

Eric Paul Schwartz (born 1957) is the former president of Refugees International and former United States Assistant Secretary of State for Population, Refugees, and Migration.

== Biography ==
Schwartz has had a three-decade career focused on humanitarian and human rights issues. He was educated at Binghamton University, receiving a B.A. in Political Science; at the Woodrow Wilson School of Public and International Affairs, receiving an M.P.A. with a specialization in International Relations; and at the New York University School of Law, receiving a J.D.

After law school, Schwartz worked for the human rights organization Asia Watch (now the Asia Division of Human Rights Watch). In 1989, he became a staff consultant of the United States House Foreign Affairs Subcommittee on Asia and the Pacific. He worked there until 1993, when he moved to the United States National Security Council, serving in a variety of functions, with his senior most title being Senior Director and Special Assistant to the President for Multilateral and Humanitarian Affairs. There, he played a role in drafting the Clinton Administration's response to a number of peacekeeping, humanitarian and refugee issues, including U.S. involvement in the United Nations Transitional Administration in East Timor, the deployment of U.S. forces to train peacekeeping forces in West Africa, the resettlement of Kurdish refugees from Northern Iraq, resettlement of Vietnamese boat people, the safe haven effort for Haitian refugees in 1994, and U.S. relief efforts in Central America and Kosovo. He left the National Security Council in 2001.

From 2001 to 2003, Schwartz held fellowships at the Woodrow Wilson Center, the United States Institute of Peace, and the Council on Foreign Relations. At the Council on Foreign Relations, he directed the Independent Task Force on Post-Conflict Iraq, working closely with co-chairs Thomas R. Pickering and James R. Schlesinger. He also was a contributor to the International Commission on Intervention and State Sovereignty's Responsibility to Protect Project.

In 2003, United Nations High Commissioner for Human Rights Sérgio Vieira de Mello invited Schwartz to join the Office of the United Nations High Commissioner for Human Rights. After Vieiera de Mello's assassination in the Canal Hotel bombing, Schwartz served as Chief of Office in the Geneva Office of the United Nations High Commissioner for Human Rights. He served there until 2004. In 2005, Secretary-General of the United Nations Kofi Annan appointed Schwartz as UN Deputy Special Envoy for Tsunami Recovery in the wake of the 2004 Indian Ocean earthquake and tsunami. In this capacity, Schwartz served under Bill Clinton, who was the Secretary-General's Special Envoy. He served as Deputy Special Envoy until 2007.

After leaving the United Nations, Schwartz became Executive Director of The Connect U.S. Fund.

President of the United States Barack Obama nominated Schwartz to be Assistant Secretary of State for Population, Refugees, and Migration. This appointment was confirmed by the United States Senate on June 19, 2009. Schwartz was sworn into office on July 9, 2009, and left office on October 4, 2011.

From October 2011 to June 2017, Schwartz served as the dean of the Hubert H. Humphrey School of Public Affairs at the University of Minnesota.

On June 12, 2017, Schwartz became president of Refugees International, leading the organization in its efforts to promote solutions to displacement crises worldwide.

On February 17, 2022, Schwartz announced his departure from the Refugees International organization.

Political offices
Preceded by Samuel M. Witten; Acting	Assistant Secretary of State for Population, Refugees, and Migration; 2009–2011	Succeeded by Anne C. Richard
