= Princeton Lyman =

American diplomat (1935–2018)

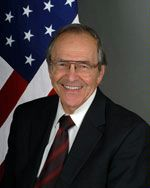

20th United States Assistant Secretary of State for International Organization Affairs
- In office March 19, 1997 – October 22, 1998
- President: Bill Clinton
- Preceded by: Douglas J. Bennet
- Succeeded by: David Welch

United States Ambassador to South Africa
- In office July 14, 1992 – December 14, 1995
- President: George H. W. Bush; Bill Clinton
- Preceded by: William Lacy Swing
- Succeeded by: James A. Joseph

United States Ambassador to Nigeria
- In office September 12, 1986 – July 24, 1989
- President: Ronald Reagan; George H. W. Bush
- Preceded by: Thomas W. M. Smith
- Succeeded by: Lannon Walker

6th Director of the Bureau of Refugee Programs
- In office September 5, 1989 – June 15, 1992
- Preceded by: Jonathan Moore
- Succeeded by: Warren Zimmermann

Personal details
- Born: November 20, 1935 San Francisco, California, U.S.
- Died: August 24, 2018 (aged 82) Silver Spring, Maryland, U.S.

Princeton Nathan Lyman (November 20, 1935 – August 24, 2018) was a diplomat and former United States Ambassador to Nigeria (1986–89) and South Africa (1992–95), and former Assistant Secretary of State for International Organization Affairs (1996–98). He was a member of the American Academy of Diplomacy and the Aspen Institute, and was Adjunct Senior Fellow for Africa Policy Studies with the Council on Foreign Relations.

Lyman had a bachelor's degree from the University of California, Berkeley and a Ph.D. from Harvard University.

== Career ==
Lyman played a crucial role in the negotiation and signing of the 1994 Accord on Afrikaner self-determination in South Africa. As the U.S. Ambassador, he skillfully mediated between General Constand Viljoen, representing Afrikaner interests, and the African National Congress (ANC). Lyman's deep understanding of South Africa's complex political landscape and his respect for Afrikaner concerns helped prevent potential conflict during the transition from apartheid, ultimately facilitating the peaceful inclusion of Afrikaners in the new South African democracy.

In January, 2010, Lyman weighed in in opposition to using the U.S. Alien Tort Statute in federal court to gain reparations for South African workers, from corporations who operated in South Africa during the apartheid era.

In January, 2011, Lyman, who acted for the US government in mediation talks between the north and south of Sudan, was in Sudan for the independence referendum of Southern Sudan.

Diplomatic posts
Preceded by Thomas W. M. Smith	United States Ambassador to Nigeria; 1986–1989	Succeeded by Lannon Walker
Government offices
Preceded by Jonathan Moore	Director of the Bureau of Refugee Programs; September 5, 1989 – June 15, 1992	Succeeded by Warren Zimmermann
Preceded by Douglas J. Bennet	Assistant Secretary of State for International Organization Affairs; March 19, 1997 – October 22, 1998	Succeeded by David Welch
