= Nancy Soderberg =

American foreign policy strategist (born 1958)

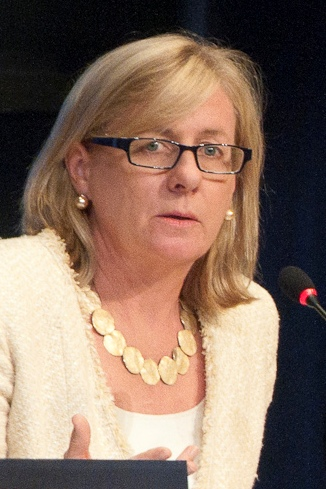
- Born: March 13, 1958 (age 68); Santurce, Puerto Rico, U.S.
- Education: Vanderbilt University (BA); Georgetown University (MS)
- Political party: Democratic
- Website: Official website

Nancy Elisabeth Soderberg (born March 13, 1958) is an American diplomat, former political candidate, and foreign policy strategist who currently serves as Resident Director for National Democratic Institute in Kosovo. Soderberg served as the third-ranking official on the Clinton administration's National Security Council from 1993 to 1997 and as an Alternate Representative to the United Nations as a Presidential Appointee, with the rank of Ambassador, from 1997 to 2001. She has also held positions at the International Crisis Group, Connect U.S. Fund, and the Public Interest Declassification Board. In 2012 she ran unsuccessfully for Florida's 4th Senate district. Soderberg ran for Congress as a Democrat in the 2018 midterm elections in Florida's 6th congressional district.

== Education and early career ==
Soderberg was born in Santurce, Puerto Rico, where her father, a civil engineer, was working on a project, and grew up in Baltimore and Tulsa, Oklahoma. She attended Vanderbilt University, spent her junior year in Paris, and graduated with a Bachelor of Arts degree in French and Economics. She spoke fluent French and "wanted to do something international but wasn't sure what" so she ended up taking a "boring" job at a bank. From 1982 to 1984, she worked as a Budget Analyst at the Bank of New England in Boston, where she prepared its budget and made regular reports to the Board of Directors regarding loan portfolios.

She was accepted to Georgetown University's School of Foreign Service in Washington, D.C., where she took a class with Madeleine Albright (who later became Bill Clinton's secretary of state), who told her to get into politics. She graduated in 1984 with a Master of Science degree, where she concentrated on international economics and political risk analysis.

== Political career ==
=== Early career ===
Albright got her a job counting delegates for Walter Mondale's campaign from 1983 to 1984 ahead of the 1984 presidential election, which he lost. She served as foreign policy advisor to Senator Ted Kennedy in the United States Senate from 1985 to 1988 and 1989 to 1992. (She took a small break to work as the deputy issues director for foreign policy for Dukakis campaign ahead of the 1988 presidential election.)

=== Clinton administration ===
In 1992, George Stephanopoulos, the Clinton campaign's communications director, asked Soderberg to join Clinton's campaign in the 1992 presidential election. She accepted and moved to Little Rock, Arkansas, for eight months to manage foreign policy.

After Clinton won the election, she was the Staff Director at the National Security Council. From 1993 to 1997, she was the Deputy Assistant to the President for National Security Affairs, the third-ranking NSC official at the White House. She is the first woman in the position, and was responsible for day-to-day crisis management, briefing the President, developing U.S. national security policy at the highest levels of government, and handling issues regarding the press and U.S. Congress. She engaged the IRA and helped negotiate a ceasefire in Northern Ireland in 1994, which she pointed to as her proudest achievement in diplomacy.

In 1997, Clinton nominated her to be the Alternate Representative to the United Nations as a Presidential Appointee, with the rank of Ambassador. Her responsibilities included representing the United States at the UN Security Council, participated in missions to key conflict areas, and promoted U.S. national security policy. Soderberg participated in a UN mission to Indonesia and East Timor in November 2000. She also negotiated key United Nations' resolutions regarding the Middle East and Africa, conducted shuttle diplomacy in Latin America, assisted in the development of the Administration's policies toward political and economic normalization with Vietnam, and advised on policies toward China, Japan, Russia, Angola, the Balkans, and Haiti.

=== Later career ===
Soderberg currently serves as NDI's Senior Resident Director for Kosovo, President and CEO of Soderberg Global Solutions and Director of the Public Service Leadership Program at the University of North Florida in Jacksonville.

From 2001 to she was Vice President for Multilateral Affairs of the International Crisis Group, where she advocated conflict prevention at the United Nations and other multilateral institutions. Although she had moved to Jacksonville, Florida, in 2004, she served as President of Connect U.S. Fund, a Washington, D.C.–based foundation that promoted responsible global engagement, from 2009 to 2013. In that capacity, she advocated conflict prevention at the United Nations and other multilateral institutions. She also served as President of the Sister Cities Program of the City of New York from 2002 to 2006. She is also Director of the Public Service Leadership Program at the University of North Florida in Jacksonville, which encourages students, who are often first-generation students and refugees, to pursue careers in public service, including in government and at nonprofit organizations. She also teaches two courses in American foreign policy.

Soderberg was a foreign-policy adviser to Michael Bloomberg during his second mayoral term, when he was receiving regular briefings on foreign policy from Soderberg, Henry Kissinger, and other experts. One source called her "Bloomberg's Condi" and spurred rumors that he was contemplating a 2008 presidential campaign.

In 2011, Jacksonville Mayor Alvin Brown appointed Soderberg to the Jacksonville International Business Coalition, and in 2013, he appointed her to the Board of the Jacksonville Port Authority. After Lenny Curry defeated Alvin Brown in the 2015 mayoral election, the new mayor requested she resign, which she did "with deep regret" with two years remaining on her four-year term.

In 2011, she was appointed by President Barack Obama to serve as Chair of the Public Interest Declassification Board (PIDB), an advisory committee established by the United States Congress to promote public access to U.S. national security decisions. In 2012 PIDB published a report calling for an overhaul of the U.S. government classification system. Soderberg wrote that the system was "outdated and incapable of dealing adequately with the large volumes of classified information generated in an era of digital communications and information systems".

She was formerly on the Board of Advisors to the President of the Naval Postgraduate School and Naval War College. She is Vice Chairman of the Board of the National Committee on American Foreign Policy.

=== Florida politics ===
Soderberg was a candidate for Florida Senate District 4 in the 2012 elections. She ran against Aaron Bean, former Florida State House Representative, in the newly open district. She ultimately lost but outperformed traditional voting patterns by 6 points.

On July 12, 2017, Soderberg filed to run for Congress as a Democrat in the 2018 midterm elections in Florida's 6th congressional district. The then-current incumbent Ron DeSantis officially announced his candidacy for governor on January 5, 2018. She received endorsements from several high-profile Democrats, including former Vice President Joe Biden. On August 28, 2018, Soderberg won the Democratic primary, defeating two challengers with 55.6% of the vote, but in the November 2018 general election she was defeated by Republican Mike Waltz 56% to 43%.

=== National Democratic Institute ===
She currently serves as Resident Director for National Democratic Institute in Kosovo.

== Personal life ==
Soderberg was visiting London at the time of the 2017 London Bridge attack. She then traveled on to Paris with her 16-year-old niece. There, the two were locked down inside the cathedral during the 2017 Notre Dame attack.

== Media ==
Soderberg publishes and speaks regularly on national security policy. Her second book, The Prosperity Agenda What the World Wants from America—and What We Need in Return, written with Brian Katulis, was published in July 2008. It argues for American leadership in tackling the world's challenges in exchange for the world assisting us with our threat. Her 2005 book, The Superpower Myth: The Use and Misuse of American Might, analyzes the use of force and diplomacy over the last decade. She is a regular commentator on national and international television and radio, having appeared on NBC, ABC, CBS, CNN, BBC, Fox, National Public Radio, the Lehrer News Hour, CNN Crossfire, and The Daily Show. Her articles have been published in the New York Times, the Washington Post, the Huffington Post, the Financial Times, and other national and international publications.

- The Superpower Myth: The Use and Misuse of American Might, Wiley, 2005, ISBN 9780471656838.
- With Brian Katulis, The Prosperity Agenda: What the World Wants from America--and What We Need in Return, Wiley, 2008, ISBN 9780470105290
