= Julia V. Taft =

American politician (1942–2008)

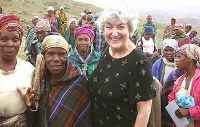

9th Assistant Secretary of State for Population, Refugees, and Migration
- In office November 10, 1997 – January 19, 2001
- President: Bill Clinton
- Preceded by: Phyllis E. Oakley
- Succeeded by: Gene Dewey

Personal details
- Born: July 27, 1942 Governors Island, New York, U.S.
- Died: March 15, 2008 (aged 65) Washington, D.C., U.S.
- Spouse(s): Fred Malone (divorced) William Howard Taft IV (m. 1974)
- Children: 3
- Education: University of Colorado at Boulder

Julia Ann Vadala Taft (née Vadala; July 27, 1942 – March 15, 2008) was a United States official who was involved in international humanitarian assistance, and who served as Director of the Office of Foreign Disaster Assistance from 1986 to 1989, and as Assistant Secretary of State for Population, Refugees, and Migration from 1997 to 2001.

== Early life ==
Julia Ann Vadala was born on Governors Island in New York Harbor. Her father was Colonel Anthony Vadala, a surgeon in the Army Medical Corps, and her mother was Shirley Harris Vadala. She attended the University of Colorado at Boulder, receiving a bachelor's degree in international politics in 1964, and a master's degree in international politics in 1969.

== Career ==
After graduating from the University of Colorado in 1969, Vadala completed a White House Fellowship at the White House. She then became an aide to United States Secretary of Health and Human Services Elliot Richardson.

In 1975, U.S. president Gerald Ford appointed Julia V. Taft as Director of the Interagency Task Force on Indochina Refugees created by the Indochina Migration and Refugee Assistance Act. In this capacity, she oversaw the resettlement of more than 130,000 evacuees from Cambodia, Laos, and Vietnam after the fall of Saigon.

Taft would spend the next three decades designing and developing refugee programs for the United States Department of State, the United States Department of Health and Human Services, the United States Agency for International Development, and the United Nations.

From 1986 to 1989, she was the director of the Office of Foreign Disaster Assistance, a part of USAID. There she was responsible for coordinating the efforts of the State Department, the Pentagon, other government agencies, and non-governmental agencies like CARE and Save the Children in responding to requests for disaster aide from foreign governments. For example, in 1986, she administered $130 million in U.S. aide sent in response to the 1984–1985 famine in Ethiopia. In 1988, she oversaw the U.S. response to the floods in Bangladesh that had left 25 million people homeless; smaller floods in the Dominican Republic and India; displaced persons in Burundi; a poisonous gas eruption in Cameroon; and a locust plague in Ethiopia. In the wake of the 1988 Spitak earthquake, she traveled to the Armenian Soviet Socialist Republic to coordinate U.S. aid.

From 1994 to 1997, Taft was head of InterAction, an alliance of non-governmental organizations dedicated to international aide.

In 1997, U.S. president Bill Clinton nominated Taft to be Assistant Secretary of State for Population, Refugees, and Migration, and she subsequently held this office from November 10, 1997, to January 19, 2001.

From 2001 to 2004, she was director of the United Nations Development Programme's Bureau for Crisis Prevention and Recovery, in which capacity she oversaw the United Nations response to displaced persons related to the War in Afghanistan.

== Personal life ==
Her first marriage, to Fred Malone, ended in divorce. She then married lawyer William Howard Taft IV, great-grandson of U.S. president William H. Taft, in 1974. Together, the couple had:

- William Howard Taft V
- Maria Taft
- Julia Taft

Taft died of colon cancer at her Washington, D.C. home.

Government offices
Preceded by Phyllis E. Oakley	Assistant Secretary of State for Population, Refugees, and Migration; November 10, 1997 – January 19, 2001	Succeeded by Arthur E. Dewey
