= Samuel M. Witten =

United States Lawyer

Assistant Secretary of State for Population, Refugees, and Migration
- Acting
- In office December 31, 2007 – July 9, 2009
- President: George W. Bush; Barack Obama
- Preceded by: Ellen Sauerbrey
- Succeeded by: Eric Schwartz

Personal details
- Education: University of Maryland, College Park (BA); Columbia Law School (JD)

Samuel M. Witten is a United States Lawyer who was Deputy Legal Adviser of the Department of State from 2001 to 2007, and Acting Assistant Secretary of State for Population, Refugees, and Migration from 2007 to 2009.

== Biography ==
Samuel M. Witten was educated at the University of Maryland, College Park, receiving a B.A. in 1979, and at Columbia Law School, receiving a J.D. in 1983.

After law school, Witten clerked for Judge Stanley Seymour Brotman of the United States District Court for the District of New Jersey. He then spent 1984 through 1989 working as a staff attorney at the United States Department of State. He worked at the law firm of O'Melveny & Myers from 1989 to 1992, where his work particularly focused on the right of U.S. airlines to operate outside the United States. He joined the United States Department of Justice Antitrust Division in 1992, working there until 1993. In 1993-94, he returned to the State Department and headed an interagency team representing the United States at an international arbitration relating to the U.S.'s longstanding dispute with the United Kingdom related to U.S. airlines' access to London Heathrow Airport.

Witten joined the United States Department of State in 1994, becoming legal counsel of the Office of the Coordinator for Counterterrorism. In 1996, he became Assistant Legal Adviser for Law Enforcement and Intelligence. There, his work involved the extradition of fugitives to and from the United States; he was also involved in negotiating treaties related to international law enforcement cooperation. In 2001, Witten was promoted to Deputy Legal Adviser of the Department of State, serving under Legal Adviser William Howard Taft IV, and, after Taft's departure in 2005, John B. Bellinger III. He was one of four State Department Deputy Legal Advisers, the top-ranking position for a career lawyer at the State Department, and supervised legal matters including international law enforcement cooperation, human rights and refugees, and international economic issues. In 2005-2006, he also served as Director of the Office of War Crimes Issues.

In June 2007, Witten was appointed Principal Deputy Assistant Secretary of State for Population, Refugees, and Migration. With the Departure of Assistant Secretary Ellen Sauerbrey, on December 31, 2007, Witten became Acting Assistant Secretary of State for Population, Refugees, and Migration. He served as Acting Assistant Secretary until July 8, 2009, when Eric P. Schwartz was sworn in as Assistant Secretary.

In 2010, Witten joined the Washington, D.C. offices of law firm Arnold & Porter.

== Personal life ==
Witten was born and raised in Baltimore, Maryland. He currently resides in Bethesda, Maryland with his wife, Joan Kleinman, and his dog Nani (2012). He has three children, Benjamin (1989), Ari (1991), and Molly (1995). He has two grandchildren, Miles (2020) and Nora (2023).

Government offices
Preceded by Ellen Sauerbrey	Assistant Secretary of State for Population, Refugees, and Migration (acting); December 31, 2007 – July 9, 2009	Succeeded by Eric P. Schwartz
