= Jonathan Moore (State Department official) =

American government official

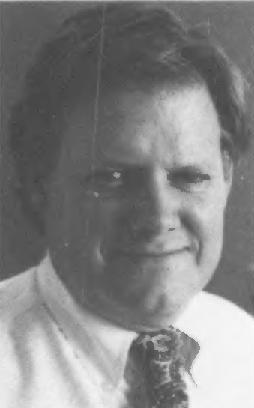
- A photograph of Moore published in State Magazine in 1986

5th Director of the Bureau of Refugee Programs
- In office March 5, 1987 – June 22, 1989
- Preceded by: James N. Purcell Jr.
- Succeeded by: Princeton Lyman

Personal details
- Born: September 10, 1932 New York, New York, U.S.
- Died: March 8, 2017 (aged 84)
- Education: Dartmouth College; Harvard University (MPA)

Jonathan Moore (10 September 1932 – 8 March 2017) was United States Director of the Bureau of Refugee Programs from 1987 to 1989 and United States Representative to the United Nations Economic and Social Council from 1989 to 1992.

== Biography ==
Jonathan Moore was born in New York City on September 10, 1932. He was educated at Dartmouth College, receiving a bachelor's degree in 1954 and at Harvard University, receiving an MPA in 1957.

In 1957, Moore joined the United States Information Agency; he was posted in Bombay and later Monrovia. In 1959, he became an assistant to the minority leadership in the United States Senate. He then served as legislative assistant to Senator Leverett Saltonstall (R–Mass.) from 1959 to 1961. In 1961, he joined the United States Department of Defense's Office of International Security Affairs, serving there until 1964, for a time as special assistant to the Assistant Secretary of Defense for International Security Affairs. He was special assistant to the Assistant Secretary of State for Far Eastern Affairs from 1964 to 1966. He then spent 1967 to 1968 as foreign affairs adviser on the national campaign staff of Governor of Michigan George W. Romney during the 1968 Republican presidential primaries. After Romney's elimination from the race, he became a foreign policy adviser on the national campaign staff of Governor of New York Nelson Rockefeller. He was briefly executive assistant to the Under Secretary of State in early 1969.

From 1969 to 1970, Moore served as Deputy Assistant Secretary of State for East Asian and Pacific Affairs (1969–70). He was then Counselor to the Department of Health, Education, and Welfare from 1970 to 1972. In 1973, he was a special assistant to the Secretary and Deputy Secretary of Defense (1973). From June to November 1973, he was United States Associate Attorney General.

Moore then joined academia, becoming Director of the Harvard Institute of Politics and a lecturer in Public Policy at the John F. Kennedy School of Government, holding this position from 1974 to 1986. In addition to his teaching duties, Moore served as a member of the advisory committee of the National Institute of Law Enforcement and Criminal Justice (1974–76); a consultant to the President's committee on the Three Mile Island accident (1979); a member of the Secretary of Health, Education, and Welfare's ad hoc group on the future strategy of the Department of Health and Human Services (1980); a member of the Cape Cod National Seashore Advisory Commission (1982–85); and a member of the United States Secretary of State's panel on Indochinese refugees (1985–86). In October 1984, he was a consultant to the United States Agency for International Development in a field assessment of the U.S. economic assistance program for the Philippines.

Mr. Moore was sworn in as U.S. Coordinator and Ambassador at Large for Refugee Affairs on September 12, 1986, and was appointed Director of the Bureau of Refugee Programs on March 5, 1987. From 1989 to 1992, he served as United States Representative to the United Nations Economic and Social Council.

He returned to the John F. Kennedy School of Government in 1992, becoming an associate of the Joan Shorenstein Center on the Press, Politics and Public Policy.

He died on 8 March 2017 at the age of 84.

Government offices
Preceded by James N. Purcell, Jr.	Director of the Bureau of Refugee Programs; March 5, 1987 – June 22, 1989	Succeeded by Princeton N. Lyman
