= William Chace =

American literary scholar

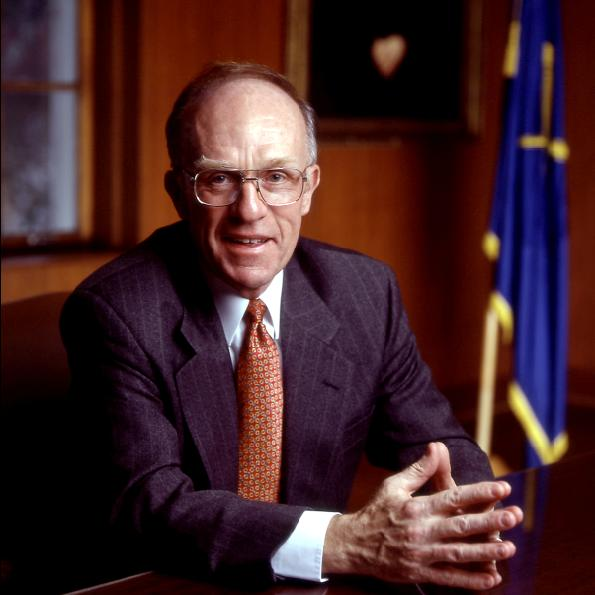
- Chace in 1998
- Born: September 3, 1938 (age 88); Newport News, Virginia

Academic background
- Influences: Alfred Satterthwaite, Guy Davenport, Thomas Flanagan, Ralph Rader, Frederick Crews

Academic work
- Main interests: English Literature, American Education
- Notable works: 100 Semesters

William Chace (born 1938) is an American literary scholar, Professor of English Emeritus at Emory University as well as Honorary Professor of English Emeritus at Stanford University. He specializes in the work of James Joyce in addition to the work of W. B. Yeats, T. S. Eliot and Ezra Pound. Also the former president of Emory University, he lives in Palo Alto, California, with his wife JoAn Johnstone Chace.

== Biography ==
Born in Newport News, Virginia, Chace was awarded the bachelor of arts degree from Haverford College (1961) and a master's (1963) and Ph.D. in English (1968) from the University of California, Berkeley. He began his teaching career during a break from his doctoral studies in 1963-64 at Stillman College, a historically Black college, in Tuscaloosa, Alabama. While there he joined with Black students in protesting the state's segregationist policies and participated in the 1964 march on the Tuscaloosa County Courthouse that ended in his arrest the only white person to have been incarcerated. Chace credits his experience at Stillman with giving him a focused direction in life and strengthening his resolve to become a teacher.

While at Stanford he rose to Professor of English and served as Associate Dean of Humanities and Sciences (1982 -1985), and Vice-Provost for Academic Planning and Development (1985 – 1988). He left Stanford to be President of Wesleyan University from 1988-1994, and subsequently become President of Emory University from 1994 until 2003. His presidency at Emory was marked by his acrimonious public relationship with Emory professor Jeffrey Sonnenfeld, culminating in Sonnenfeld's resignation. Sonnenfeld subsequently sued Emory in the Federal Court, and during the proceedings it emerged that Chace had anonymously leaked information to the press regarding evidence admitted in the suit, in contravention to university policy.

After his service as president he taught courses on Joyce and on Yeats, “War and Literature”, and a course on the relationship of modern literature to ancient literature. He currently teaches a number of courses—on Joyce, Yeats, Eliot and Pound—at Stanford University in its Continuing Studies Program. A chair has been named in his honor in this program.

Chace also participated in dramatics at Stillman, acting in a production of Edward Albee's “The Death of Bessie Smith”, and Kurt Weill's Lost in the Stars

== College presidencies ==
While at Wesleyan, Chace developed a five-year master plan with the aim of integrating academic and financial development which resulted in a reduction in the size of the administrative staff, a six percent reduction in faculty size, and a large reduction in annual operating expenses. This consolidation caused dissent, especially among faculty, but in his own reflections on his tenure there, Chace cited as one of his prime imperatives the need to improve the quality of the faculty. He also wanted the faculty to take more responsibility for decision making. Writing about it in “Inside Higher Education”, Chace wrote “faculty members are not so much the employees of the institution as they are its intellectual engine and its most important asset. They are "capital" rather than "labor.””

During several months of student protests at Wesleyan in 1990, Chace's office was firebombed. He had been accused of being racist and uncommitted to diversity, an irony that the media noted given his early teaching at Stillman and his participation in the civil-rights movement that resulted in being “thrown to the ground by police, threatened with a cattle prod, and locked in jail overnight on charges that included resisting arrest.” Commenting on the Wesleyan incident, Chace remarked “..when you become president of an institution, for some students it does not make any difference what you were once upon a time. You are 'the man.' You are the symbol or the representative of authority, and you are seen in that way.” Later, a group calling itself STRIKE (Students Rebuilding Institutions for Knowledge and Education) claimed responsibility for the act. Chace referred to the act as not political, but criminal. In 2013, Chace said his years at Wesleyan were "the hardest years of my life," calling the college "a tough place for me."

During his tenure at Emory, the University experienced a tremendous growth as a research institution. Emory also invested $1 billion in campus renovation including a new standalone performing arts center, and a residential complex for students. Emory also worked towards making the campus environmentally sound and encouraging diversity in the student body.

In 1995, Chace oversaw Emory's establishment of a campus-wide domestic partners policy for all employees, setting a trend for schools and businesses in the South, although by 2002 it remained only one of two schools in Georgia offering same-sex domestic partners benefits. The move prompted criticism from United Methodist Church's Southeastern Jurisdictional Conference with which Emory has historic ties, though the conference's resolution passed by only a narrow margin. Chace responded in a lengthy letter to the presiding bishop, arguing that Emory's policy was consistent both with its educational mission and with the call to justice in the Methodist Church's Book of Discipline.

== Scholarly writing ==
Chace has written two scholarly books––The Political Identities of Ezra Pound and T.S. Eliot(1973) and Lionel Trilling: Criticism and Politics (1983)–– and edited (with Peter Collier) Justice Denied: The Black Man in White America; Making It New (poetry anthology with JoAn E. Chace); James Joyce: A Collection of Critical Essays; and An Introduction to Literature (again with Peter Collier).

His scholarly articles include writings on Ezra Pound, T. S. Eliot, Lionel Trilling, Graham Greene, D. H. Lawrence, T. E. Lawrence and James Joyce. In 2008 Common Knowledge published the first of several essays and reviews Chace contributed to that magazine, "On the Margin: Irving Howe Reconsidered". In 2011, he contributed an essay on Ezra Pound to a volume titled "AfterWord: Conjuring the Literary Dead".

== Writing about education ==
Chace has written many articles about various aspects of and problems in higher education for The Chronicle of Higher Education, the New York Times, and other publications. Topics covered include multiculturalism, political correctness, consumerism and university finances. The American Interest published his essay, “Apply and Demand,” about the financing of American higher education. These topics are also addressed in his academic memoir 100 Semesters: My Adventures as Student, Professor, and University President, and What I Learned along the Way. and in lectures he gave in 2006 to the Association of American Universities and the Hechinger Institute at Columbia University.

His 2009 essay in The American Scholar entitled “Where Have All the Students Gone?” was named by David Brooks of The New York Times as one of the best essays of the year and was named by that columnist a winner of a “Sidney Hook Award.” The American Scholar has also published his essays “Affirmative Action’s Last Chance.” (2010) and “The Truth about Campus Cheating.”

== Additional publications ==
- "The Unhappiness of Happiness" in The Hedgehog Review
- "What I Have Taught and Learned" in "The American Scholar"
