= Rony Brauman =

Doctors without Borders president and French physician

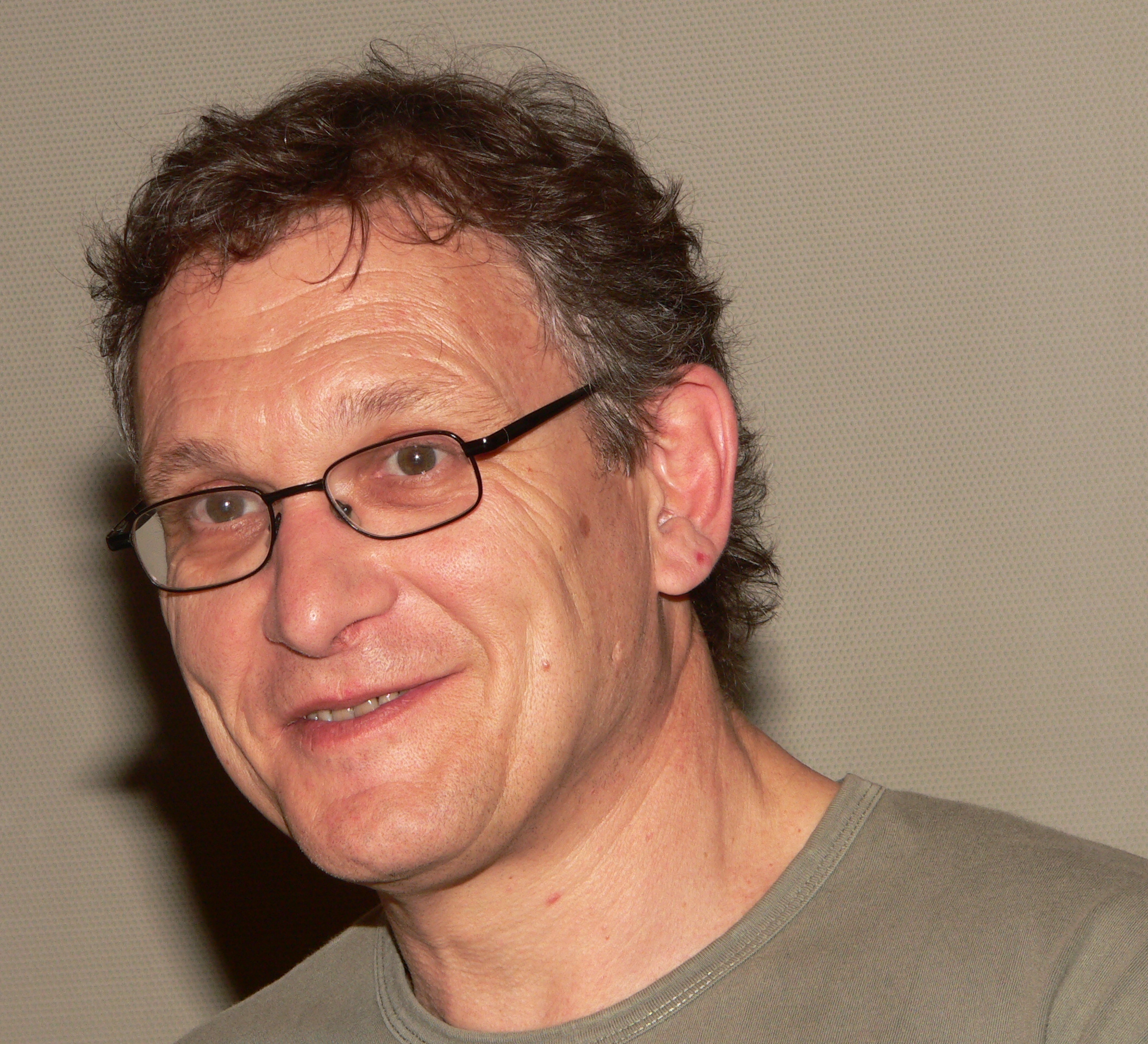
- Rony Brauman in 2007
- Born: 19 June 1950 (age 75); Jerusalem, Israel
- Education: Lycée Lakanal
- Occupation: Physician

Rony Brauman (born 19 June 1950) is a French physician specializing in tropical diseases and a former president of Médecins sans frontières (Doctors without Borders).

He was one of the early members of Médecins sans frontières, and was its president from 1982 to 1994. As president, Brauman oversaw the financial and operational expansion of the movement, including the establishment of new operational centers and chapters around the world. He was a professor at the Sciences Po from 1994 to 1997 and is now scientific advisor in the school of international affairs of Sciences Po.

With Israeli director Eyal Sivan, his cousin, he co-directed a documentary (1999) on the trial of Adolf Eichmann (1961) based on Hannah Arendt's 1963 book Eichmann in Jerusalem.

Brauman is also a former Director of the Humanitarian and Conflict Response Institute (HCRI) at the University of Manchester.

== Bibliography ==
- "Fondation Prix Henry Dunant - 1997 - Rony Brauman". Fondation Prix Henry Dunant.
