= Richard David Vine =

American diplomat (1925-2008)

3rd Director of the Bureau of Refugee Programs
- In office January 10, 1982 – September 17, 1982
- Preceded by: Frank E. Loy
- Succeeded by: James N. Purcell Jr.

Personal details
- Born: December 10, 1925 New York, New York, U.S.
- Died: May 14, 2008 (aged 82)
- Education: Georgetown University; Yale University (MA)

Richard David Vine (December 10, 1925 – May 14, 2008) was a career diplomat, US Ambassador to Switzerland from 1979 to 1981, and later Director General of the Atlantic Institute for International Affairs.

== Education and diplomatic career ==
He was born in 1925 New York City. After serving in the US Army from 1943 to 1946, Vine graduated from Georgetown University in 1949 and later earned an M.A. at Yale University.

In the 1950s, as a Foreign Service officer, he was posted to Bonn, Tel Aviv and Paris.

In the early 1960s, he served as officer in charge of European integration affairs at the State Department in Washington, D.C. before taking up a second posting in Bonn in 1963.

Vine went on from there to Brussels, where he was USEC counselor for political affairs from 1965 to 1969, and then to Bern, Switzerland, as Deputy Chief of Mission from 1969 to 1972.

== US Ambassador to Switzerland ==
Back in Washington, between 1972 and 1979, Vine's State Department functions included Director of Western European Affairs, Deputy Assistant Secretary of State for European Affairs, and Deputy Assistant Secretary for Canadian Affairs.

He served as Jimmy Carter’s Ambassador Extraordinary and Plenipotentiary to Switzerland from 1979 to the end of the Carter administration in 1981.

== Director General of the Atlantic Institute ==
Ambassador Vine had started a new position as Director of the State Department's Bureau of Refugee Programs in 1982 when he was asked by the Paris-based Atlantic Institute for International Affairs to become its Director General.

In 1984, soon after he had resigned from the Foreign Service and taken up the function, the French left-wing guerilla group Action Directe bombed the Institute’s empty premises, which were almost completely demolished by the blast.

Although Institute activities resumed at a new location, Vine was later informed by French police that he personally was on the group's hit list. Georges Besse, head of the Renault car manufacturing company, was gunned down on a Paris street by two members of the group in 1986.

Vine resigned his post, and returned to the United States, spending the last 20 years of his life in active retirement in Millington, and then Chestertown, Maryland.

He remained on the Atlantic Institute's Board of Governors, and was also a member of the Council on Foreign Affairs. He died in 2008 in Chestertown, Maryland.

== Bibliography ==
=== As author/editor ===
Richard D. Vine, Editor, Soviet-East European Relations As a Problem for the West, London, New York, Croom Helm, 1987.

=== Additional biographical information ===
Ambassador John E. Dolibois, "The Class of 1945", in Prelude to Nuremberg. World War II Chronicles. A Quarterly Publication of the World War II Veterans Committee, Washington D.C. Issue XXXI, Autumn, 2005, pp. 7–16.

Linda Scarbrough, "Washington Bird Watch", in The Washington Post Potomac, Washington D.C. April 10, 1977, pp. 12–13, 23–24.

In the context of the hijackings, hostages and civil war in Jordan in September 1970, one of the major issues during Vine's 1969-1972 tour of duty in Switzerland

David Raab, Terror in Black September: The First Eyewitness Account of the Infamous 1970 Hijackings, New York and Houndmills, UK, Palgrave Macmillan, 2007.

In the context of the Robert Vesco affair, another of the major issues during Vine's 1969-1972 tour of duty in Switzerland

Jim Hougan, Spooks: The Haunting of America – The Private Use of Secret Agents, New York, Bantam Books, 1979.

Robert A. Hutchinson, Vesco, New York, Avon Books, 1976.

In the context of US/Canada relations

Jack Lawrence Granatstein, Robert Bothwell, Pirouette: Pierre Trudeau and Canadian Foreign Policy, Toronto, University of Toronto Press, 1991.

Jean-François Lisée, In the Eye of the Eagle, Toronto, HarperCollins Publishers Ltd, 1990.

In the context of Vine's directorship of the Bureau for Refugee Programs

Refugee Report, "In Profile: Richard D. Vine, Bureau of Refugee Programs", Volume III, Number 4, January 29, 1982.

Refugee Report, "U.S. to Process Cambodian Refugees", Volume III, Number 12, May 21, 1982, p. 4.

In the context of American foreign policy during the Carter administration

The Rodney Kennedy-Minott Papers 1967–1990, Folder 12, Richard D. Vine Esquire, Hoover Institution Archives, Stanford, California, Register of the Papers

John T. Woolley and Gerhard Peters, The online American Presidency Project

Government offices
Preceded by Frank E. Loy	Director of the Bureau of Refugee Programs; January 10, 1982 – September 17, 1982	Succeeded by James N. Purcell, Jr.
Diplomatic posts
Preceded by Marvin L. Warner	United States Ambassador to Switzerland; 1979–1981	Succeeded by Faith Whittlesey
