= Arthur E. Dewey =

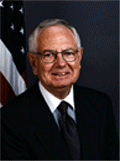

10th Assistant Secretary of State for Population, Refugees, and Migration
- In office January 30, 2002 – July 1, 2005
- Preceded by: Julia V. Taft
- Succeeded by: Ellen Sauerbrey

Personal details
- Born: February 18, 1933 (age 93) Pennsylvania, U.S.
- Education: United States Military Academy (BS); Princeton University (MSE)

Arthur Eugene "Gene" Dewey (born February 18, 1933) was United States Assistant Secretary of State for Population, Refugees, and Migration from 2002 to 2005.

== Biography ==
Born in Pennsylvania, Gene Dewey was educated at the United States Military Academy, graduating with a B.S. degree in 1956. He was then commissioned into the United States Army Corps of Engineers, serving with a Combat Engineer Battalion in West Germany as battalion aviator and later as an engineer company commander. He then attended Princeton University, receiving an M.S.E. degree in 1961. He was then posted briefly at Fort Benning, before being part of the first ever deployment of an Army Aviation company overseas, flying over 1000 hours in Southeast Asia during the Vietnam War and earning three Air Medals. Then, he commanded an engineering company at Fort Stewart and attended the United States Army Command and General Staff College, graduating in 1965. A stint in the Office of the Chief of Research and Development at the Pentagon was followed by a promotion to major and a posting as aide-de-camp to the Commanding General of the United States Army Materiel Command, Lieutenant General Frank S. Besson, Jr.

In 1968, Dewey was named one of the White House Fellows and spent a year as Assistant to the Administrator of the United States Agency for International Development. In this capacity, he played a major role in coordinating United States civilian relief efforts during the Nigerian Civil War, developing the Cross River proposal for delivering humanitarian aide into the Biafra region.

After his year as a White House fellow, Dewey returned to the army. As a lieutenant colonel in 1970, he commanded the 222nd Combat Aviation Battalion in the Vietnam War. He received the Distinguished Flying Cross and six more Air Medals for commanding the helicopter gun trips during the prisoner rescue efforts in Cambodia. He spent 1971 as Director of the President´s Commission on White House Fellowships. The next year, he was selected by the United States Army War College to study at the Graduate Institute of International Studies in Geneva. He then returned to the Pentagon as Chief of the Political-Military Division in the Office of the Deputy Chief of Staff for Military Operations. In 1975, he served as Senior Military Fellow at the Council on Foreign Relations. The next year, he became commanding officer of the U.S. military community in Heilbronn. He then became a Defense Planner in the U.S. Mission to NATO. He returned to the Pentagon in 1978 as Executive Officer in the Office of the Assistant Secretary of Defense for International Security Affairs, where he played a role in designed the Theater Nuclear Force Program for Western Europe.

Dewey retired from the army as a colonel in 1981, accepting a civilian position at Deputy Assistant Secretary of State in the Bureau for Refugee Programs. In response to the 1984–1985 famine in Ethiopia, Dewey convinced Secretary-General of the United Nations Javier Pérez de Cuéllar to create the United Nations Organization for Emergency Operations in Africa.

In early 1986, UN Secretary-General Pérez de Cuéllar named Dewey a United Nations Assistant Secretary General, with the post of Deputy United Nations High Commissioner for Refugees in Geneva.

In 1991, United States Secretary of State Lawrence Eagleburger asked Dewey to head the new Office of Emergency Humanitarian Assistance for the former Soviet Union. From 1993 to 1997, he was head of the Congressional Hunger Center, a non-governmental organization. There, his work was instrumental in energizing the U.S. response to the Great Lakes refugee crisis. In 1997, he became Professor in Residence at the Army Peacekeeping Institute at Carlisle Barracks.

In January 2002, President of the United States George W. Bush nominated Dewey to be Assistant Secretary of State for Population, Refugees, and Migration, and Dewey subsequently held this office from January 30, 2002 to July 1, 2005. There, he had to deal with the four million refugees created by the War in Afghanistan, which he did by convincing President of Afghanistan Hamid Karzai to create an Afghan Conservation Corps modeled on the U.S. Civilian Conservation Corps. He also negotiated an agreement with the government of Vietnam to reestablish the Orderly Departure Program.

Dewey retired in 2005.

Government offices
Preceded by Julia V. Taft	Assistant Secretary of State for Population, Refugees, and Migration; January 30, 2002 – July 1, 2005	Succeeded by Ellen Sauerbrey
