= Assistant Secretary of State for Population, Refugees, and Migration =

U.S. government position

United States Assistant Secretary of State for Population, Refugees, and Migration
- Seal of the United States Department of State

- Flag of an assistant secretary of state

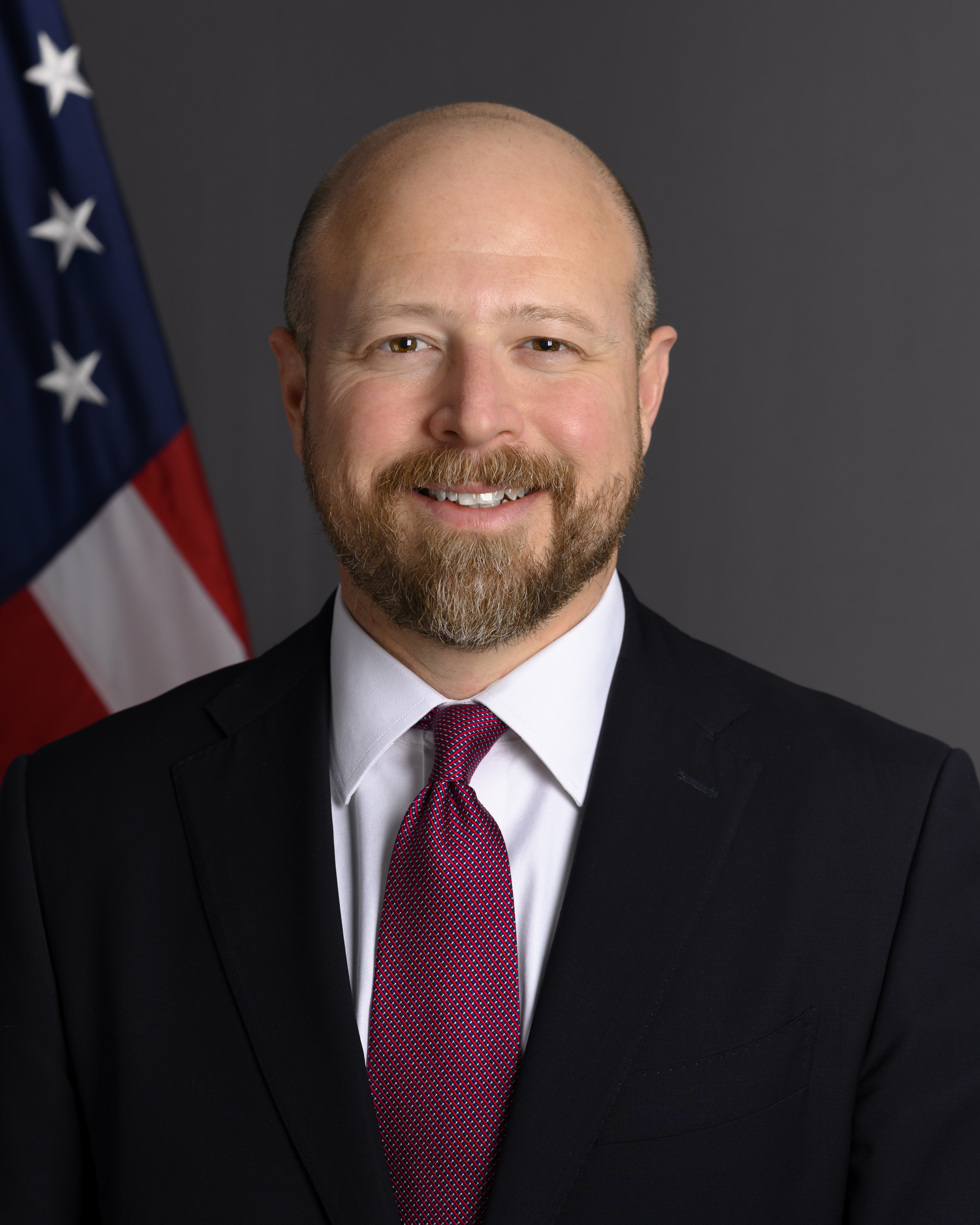
- Incumbent; Andrew Veprek since January 2, 2026
- Reports to: Under Secretary of State for Foreign Assistance, Humanitarian Affairs, and Religious Freedom
- Nominator: President of the United States
- Inaugural holder: John Alexander Baker, Jr.
- Formation: 1979
- Website: Official Website

The assistant secretary of state for population, refugees, and migration is the head of the Bureau of Population, Refugees, and Migration within the United States Department of State. The assistant secretary of state for population, refugees, and migration reports to the under secretary foreign assistance, humanitarian affairs and religious freedom.

== List of the directors of the Bureau of Refugee Programs, 1979–1994 ==
#	Name	Assumed office	Left office	President served under
1	John A. Baker, Jr.	August 26, 1979	October 30, 1980	Jimmy Carter
2	Frank E. Loy	June 1, 1980	January 30, 1981	Jimmy Carter
3	Richard David Vine	January 10, 1982	September 17, 1982	Ronald Reagan
4	James N. Purcell, Jr.	June 12, 1983	September 28, 1986	Ronald Reagan
5	Jonathan Moore	March 5, 1987	June 22, 1989	Ronald Reagan
6	Princeton Lyman	September 5, 1989	June 15, 1992	George H. W. Bush
7	Warren Zimmermann	June 15, 1992	March 3, 1994	Bill Clinton

== List of the assistant secretaries of state for population, refugees, and migration, 1994–present ==
#	Name	Assumed office	Left office	President served under
8	Phyllis E. Oakley	September 21, 1994	November 7, 1997	Bill Clinton
9	Julia V. Taft	November 10, 1997	January 19, 2001	Bill Clinton
10	Arthur E. Dewey	January 30, 2002	July 1, 2005	George W. Bush
11	Ellen Sauerbrey	January 12, 2006	December 31, 2007	George W. Bush
–	Samuel M. Witten (Acting)	December 31, 2007	July 9, 2009	George W. Bush
12	Eric P. Schwartz	July 9, 2009	October 4, 2011	Barack Obama
13	Anne C. Richard	April 2, 2012	January 20, 2017	Barack Obama
–	Simon Henshaw (Acting)	January 20, 2017	January 14, 2018	Donald Trump
–	Carol Thompson O'Connell (Acting)	January 22, 2018	January 20, 2021	Donald Trump
–	Richard Albright (Acting)	January 20, 2021	March 31, 2022	Joe Biden
14	Julieta Valls Noyes	March 31, 2022	October 4, 2024	Joe Biden
–	Marta Costanzo Youth (Acting)	October 7, 2024	January 17, 2025	Joe Biden
–	Spencer Chretien (Acting)	April 27, 2025	January 2, 2026	Donald Trump
15	Andrew Veprek	January 2, 2026	Present	Donald Trump
