= Shorenstein =

Shorenstein is a surname. Notable people with the surname include:

- Carole Shorenstein Hays (born 1948), American theatrical producer
- Douglas W. Shorenstein (1955–2015), American real estate developer
- Joan Shorenstein (1947–1985), American journalist and television producer
- Walter Shorenstein (1915–2010), American real estate developer

== See also ==
- Shorenstein Center on Media, Politics and Public Policy
- Harry Shorstein, American lawyer (born 1940)
- Schornstein Grocery and Saloon, United States historic place
- Mordecai Schornstein, Chief Rabbi of Denmark and the founder of the Tel Aviv zoo
- Evan Shornstein, an American musician and DJ known as Photay
