= Walter Shorenstein =

American businessman (1915–2010)

- Born: February 15, 1915; Glen Cove, New York, US
- Died: June 24, 2010 (aged 95)
- Education: University of Pennsylvania (BA)
- Occupation: Real estate developer
- Known for: Principal of Shorenstein Properties
- Spouse: Phyllis Finley
- Children: Joan Shorenstein; Carole Shorenstein Hays; Douglas W. Shorenstein

Walter H. Shorenstein (February 15, 1915 – June 24, 2010) was an American billionaire real estate developer and investor. His company, Shorenstein Properties, owned 130 buildings totaling at least 28,000,000 square feet (2,600,000 m^{2}) of office space at the time of his death.

== Early life ==
Shorenstein was born to a Jewish family in 1915 in Glen Cove, New York, son of a clothier. His uncle, Hyman Schorenstein, was a political "kingmaker" in New York during the early 20th century, and ancestor to a number of New York politicians. In 1934, he graduated from the University of Pennsylvania. In 1941, he enlisted in the United States Air Force.

== Career ==
Upon his discharge from the Air Force, Shorenstein moved to San Francisco with savings of $1,000. He worked as a commercial real estate broker, becoming a partner at Milton Meyer and Co., a firm he bought in 1960 upon its founder's death and renamed after himself. He and others attributed his success in business to "street smarts".

In 1993, Shorenstein helped an investor group purchase the San Francisco Giants baseball team thus preventing the franchise from moving to Florida.

== Philanthropy and political activities ==
Shorenstein became active politically and was a significant fundraiser for the Democratic Party. He was a major donor to civic and charitable causes, as well as higher education. He was prominent in the Jewish-American political and philanthropic community. In honor of his daughter who died of cancer in 1985, Shorenstein founded the Joan Shorenstein Center on the Press, Politics and Public Policy—renamed the Shorenstein Center on Media, Politics and Public Policy in 2014—at Harvard University's Kennedy School of Government. He also endowed the Walter H. Shorenstein Forum for Asia Pacific Studies at Stanford University. In 1993, he and Mikhail Gorbachev established the Gorbachev Foundation in San Francisco. In 1994, President Bill Clinton appointed him as a member of the Board of Directors of the Corporation for National and Community Service, a position he filled until 2007.

== Family ==
In 1945, Shorenstein married Phyllis Finley of Wellington, Kansas. She met her husband while working as a volunteer ambulance driver at Travis Air Force Base, where Shorenstein was stationed during World War II. Phyllis converted to Judaism. Mrs. Shorenstein had a heart ailment and died in 1994 at the age 76 in San Francisco. They had three children:

- Joan Shorenstein (born 1947), his eldest daughter, a producer for the CBS Evening News and Face The Nation, died of cancer in 1985. She was married to journalist Michael Barone.
- Carole Shorenstein Hays (born 1948), a Broadway producer with whom he established three major theaters in San Francisco: the Orpheum, the Curran and the Golden Gate.
- Douglas W. Shorenstein (born 1955) was chairman and chief executive of Shorenstein Properties. In 2010, he was appointed Chairman of the Federal Reserve Bank of San Francisco Board of Directors. He died of cancer in 2015.

== Awards and honors ==
- 1991: Golden Plate Award of the American Academy of Achievement
- 1997: University of Southern California’s Real Estate Hall of Fame
- 1997: Democratic National Committee’s Lifetime Achievement Award
- 1998: Bay Area Council’s Business Hall of Fame
- 2013: Harvard Kennedy School (HKS) establishes the Walter Shorenstein Fellowship in Media and Democracy
