= Theatre District, San Francisco =

Coordinates: 37.7825°N 122.4108°W

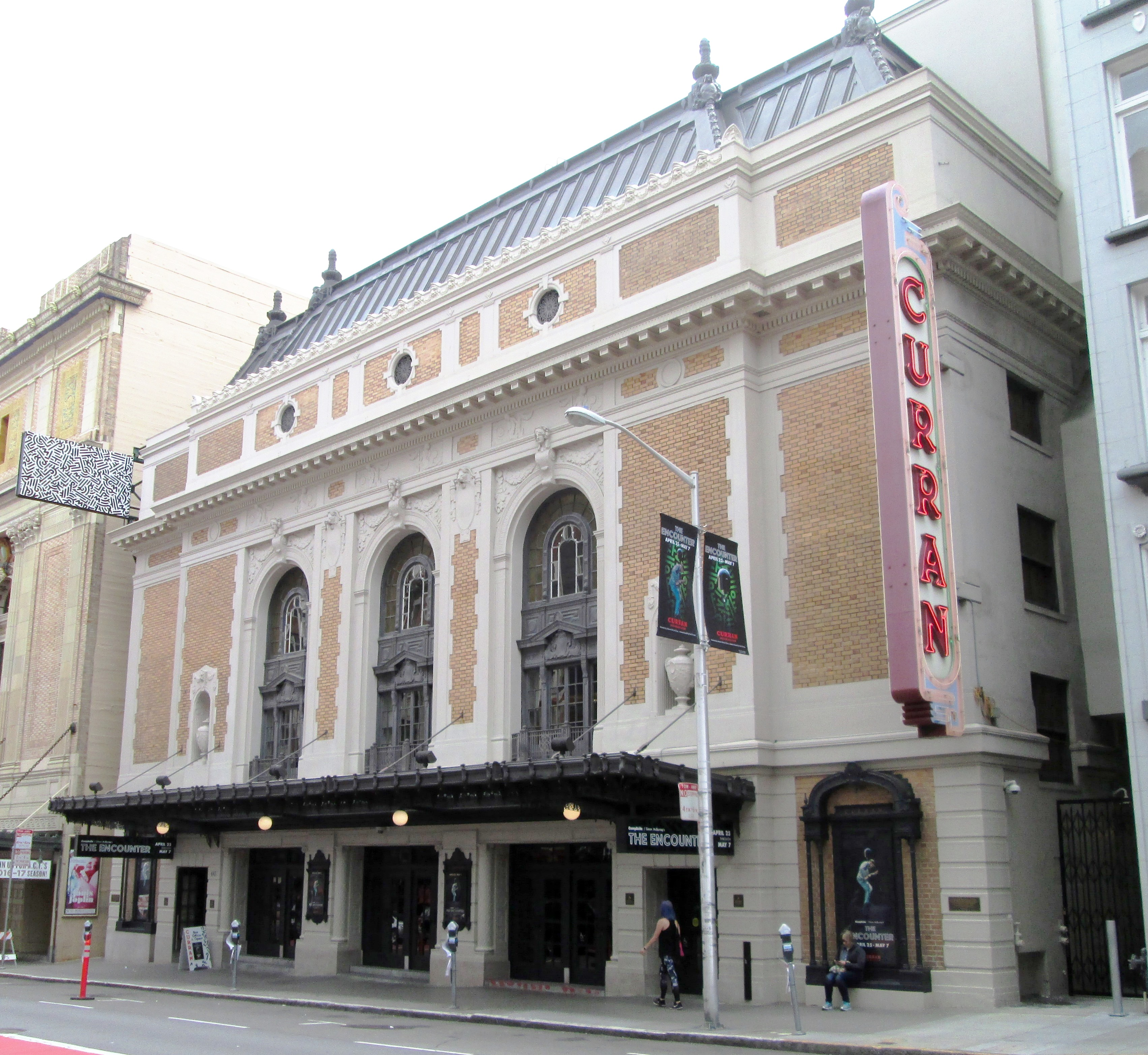
The Curran Theatre (2017)

The San Francisco Theatre District is a neighborhood in San Francisco named for the legitimate theaters located there. The district encompasses part of the Union Square shopping district and the Tenderloin and Civic Center neighborhoods. Theaters in the area include the Orpheum Theatre, Curran Theatre, Golden Gate Theatre, San Francisco Playhouse, and American Conservatory Theater (which includes The Strand and Geary Theaters).

== Gallery ==
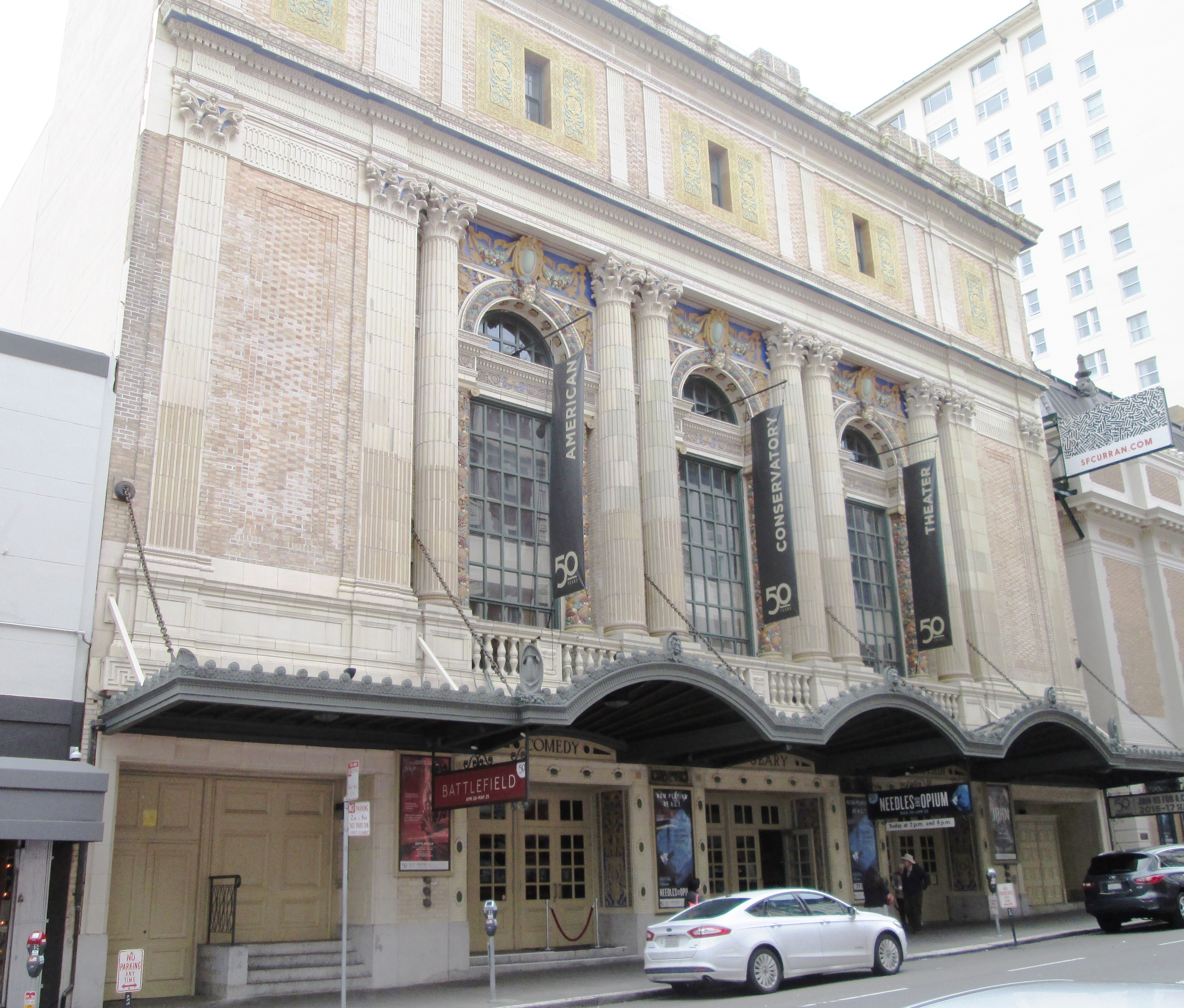
The Geary Theatre (2017)

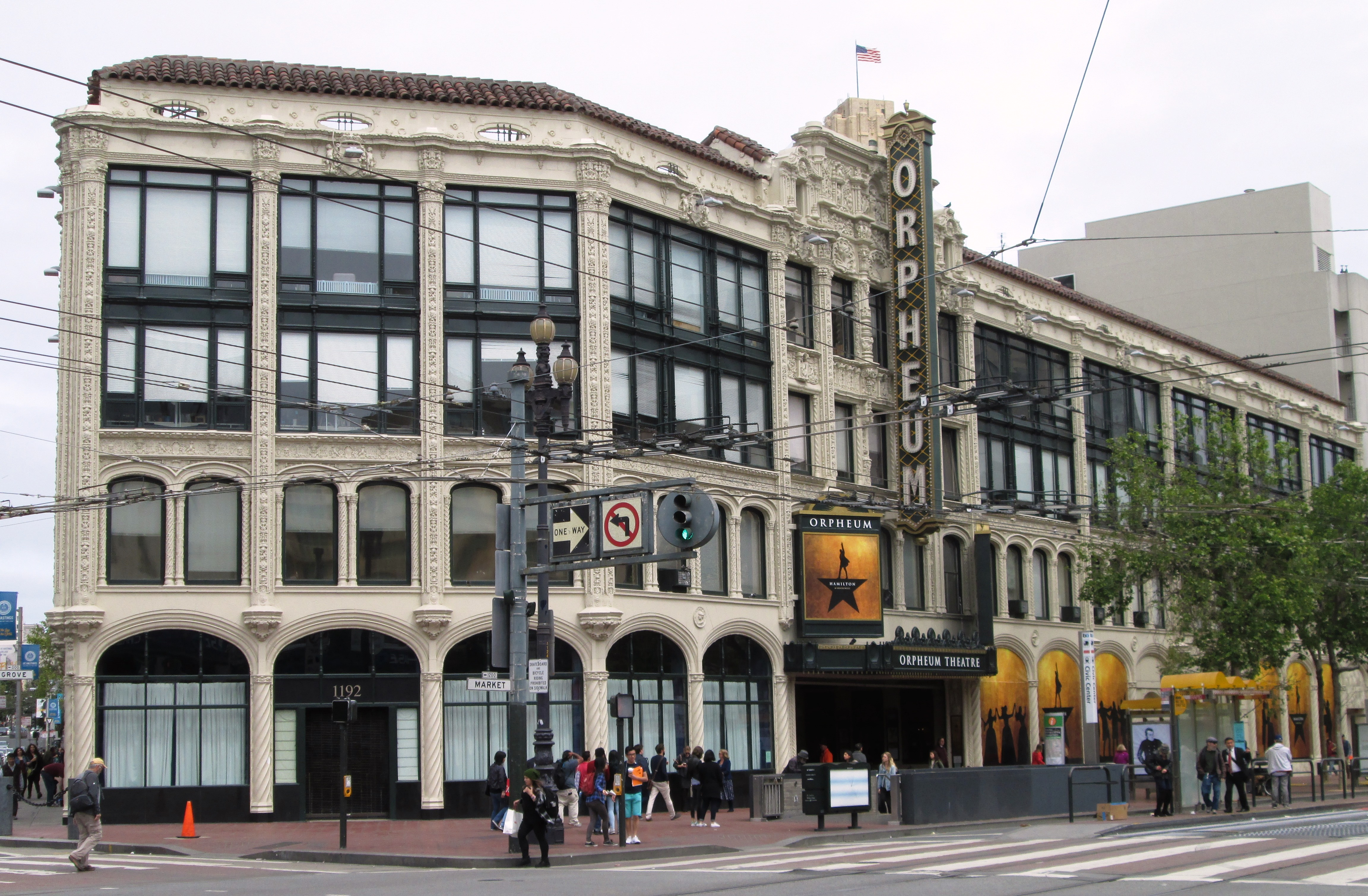
The Orpheum Theatre (2017)

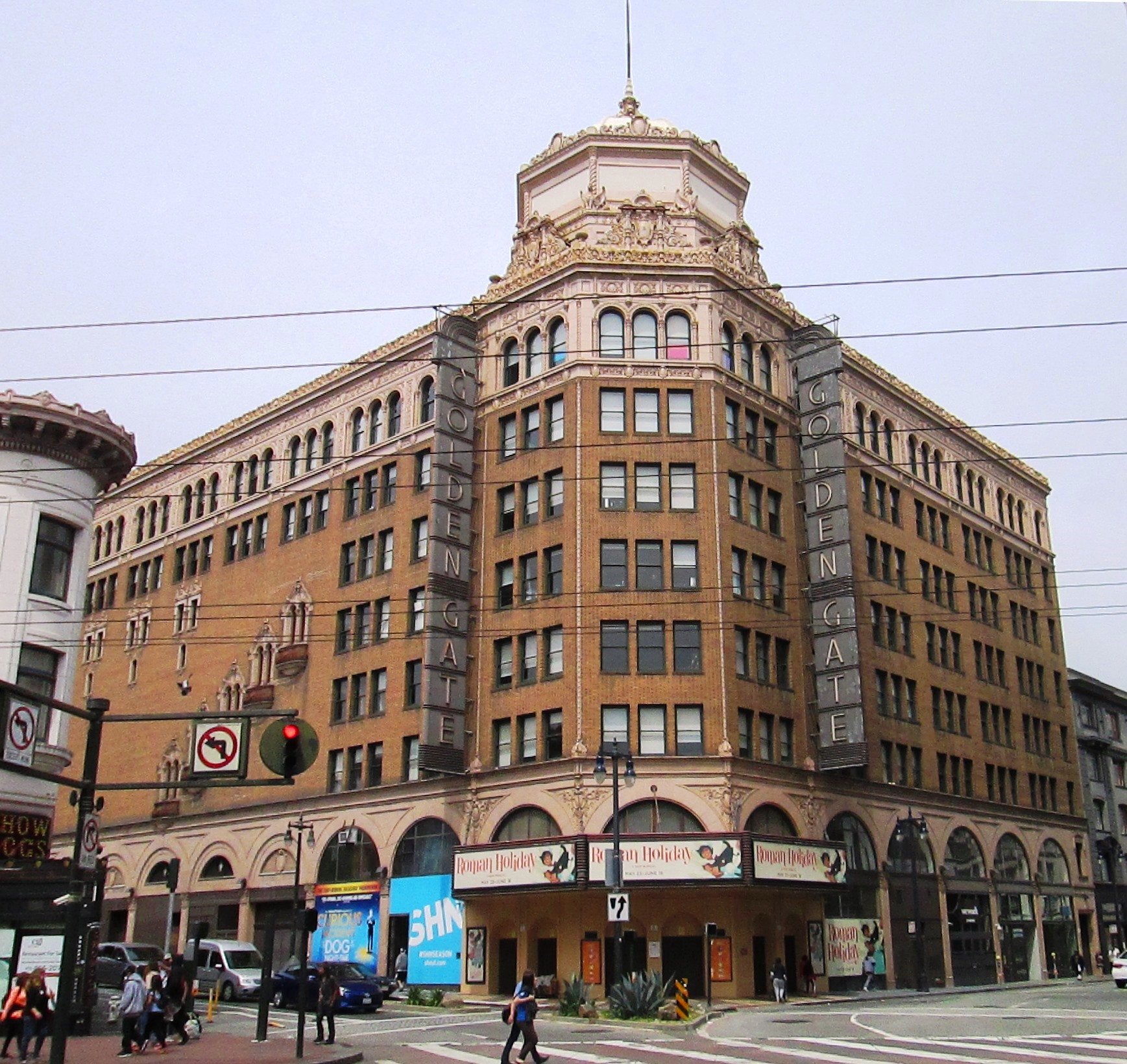
The Golden Gate Theatre (2017)

== See also ==
- List of theatres in San Francisco
- Boston Theater District
- Buffalo Theater District
- Cleveland Theater District
- Houston Theater District
- Broadway Theater District (Los Angeles)
- Theater District, New York
