= Market Square (San Francisco) =

Building in San Francisco, California

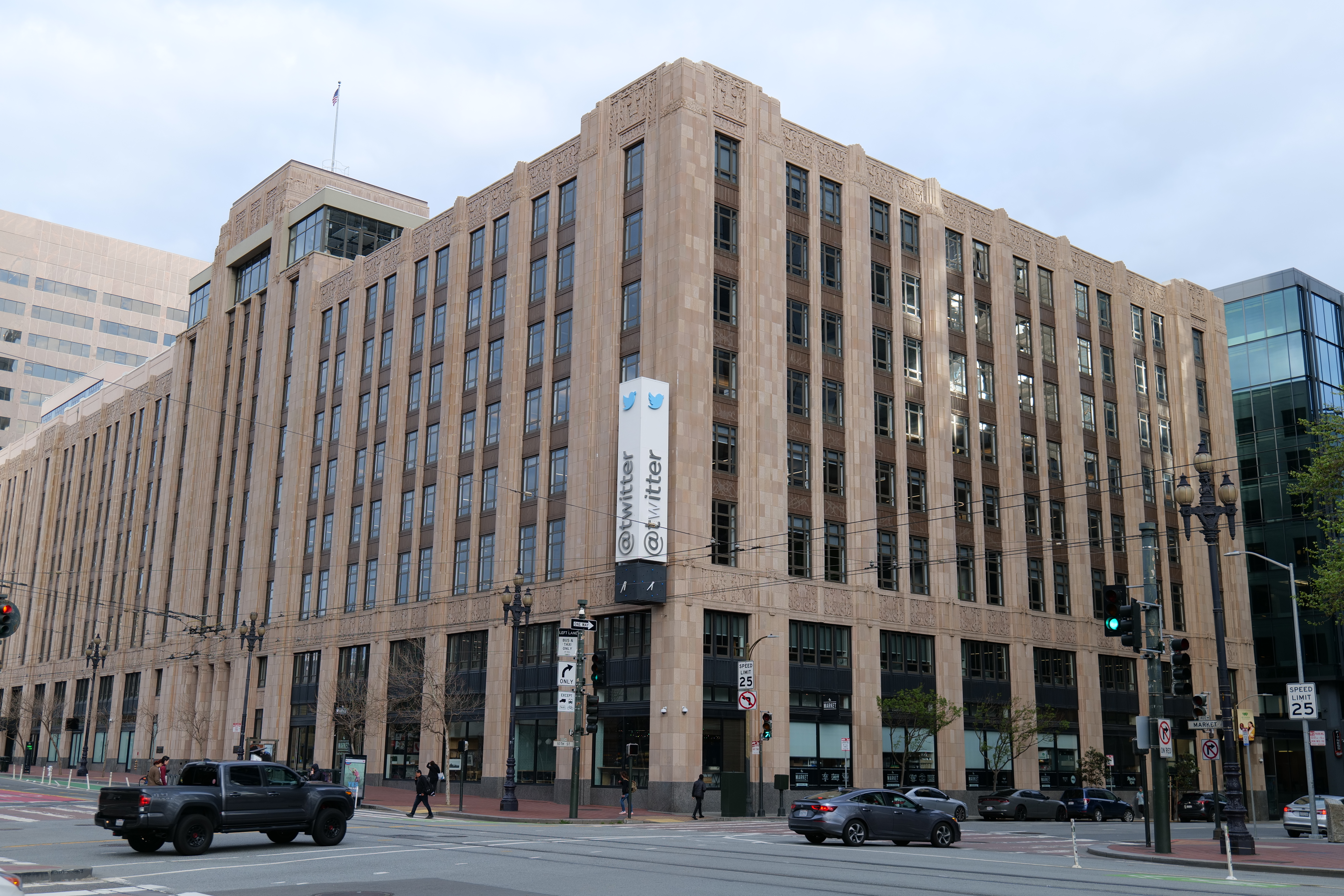
- The building in May 2023
- Interactive map of the Market Square area
- Former names: Western Furniture Exchange and Merchandise Mart; San Francisco Mart
- Alternative names: Twitter Building

General information
- Architectural style: Art Deco (Additional elements of Mayan Revival and International Style)
- Location: 1355 Market Street, San Francisco, California, United States
- Coordinates: 37°46′35″N 122°25′01″W
- Year built: 1936–1937
- Opened: July 31, 1937 (Dedication ceremony); August 3, 1937 (Official opening)
- Owner: JPMorgan Chase; Shorenstein Properties
- Landlord: Shorenstein Properties

Technical details
- Floor count: 11
- Floor area: 1,000,000 square feet (93,000 m^{2})

Design and construction
- Architecture firm: Capital Co. Architects

Market Square (formerly the Western Furniture Exchange and Merchandise Mart, the San Francisco Mart, and, colloquially, the Twitter Building) is an Art Deco building in the Mid-Market neighborhood of San Francisco, California, United States. Located at 1355 Market Street, it was constructed in 1937 and originally served as a showroom for retailers and wholesalers in the furniture industry. In the early 21st century, the building underwent an extensive conversion into office and retail space, and is most well known as the former headquarters of Twitter, Inc. and its successor X Corp. until 2024.

== Site ==
The building is located at 1355 Market Street, occupying the length of the city block between Ninth and Tenth Streets, bounded on the other side by Stevenson Street. This places the building in San Francisco's Mid-Market neighborhood, which is bounded by Fifth Street, Market Street, Mission Street, and Van Ness Avenue, in the city's central business district. Historically, this area around the site on Market Street was a theater district occupied by numerous theaters and movie palaces during the early 20th century, such as the Fox Theatre, which was situated across the street from the building.

== Architecture ==
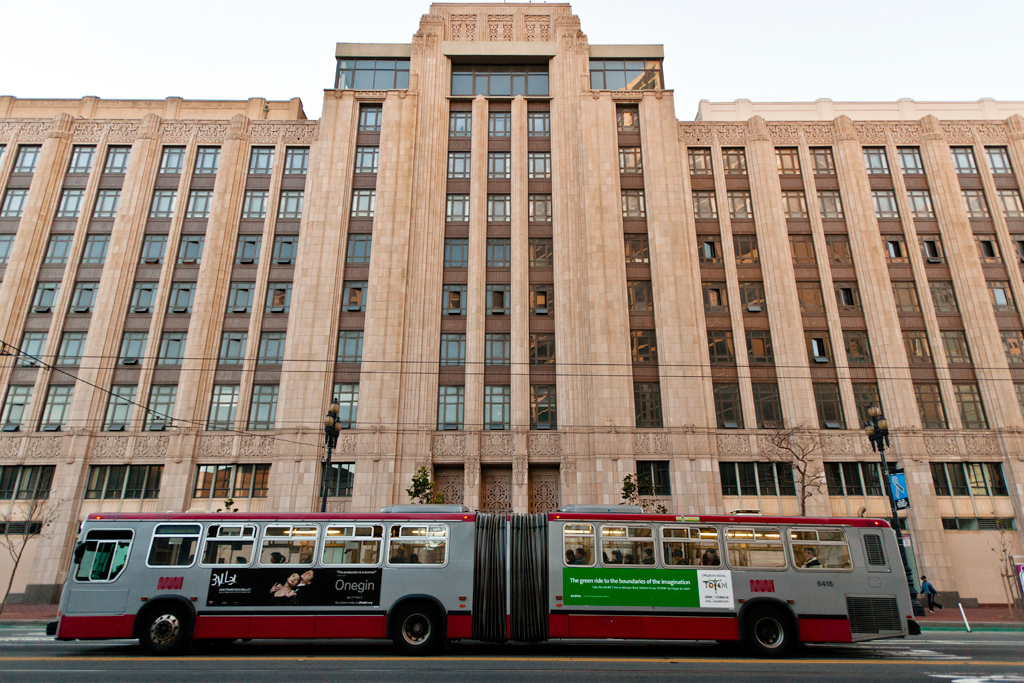
Front façade of the building, 2012

The building is primarily designed in the Art Deco style, with additional elements of Mayan Revival architecture. A penthouse was given a later renovation in the International Style. The building was designed by the architectural firm of Capital Co. Architects, though preservationists are not sure of any of the specific architects who were involved in the project. In its current configuration, after several extensive renovations and expansions, it has an L-shaped layout, with frontages along Market, Ninth, and Tenth Streets. Each façade has multiple sand-colored terracotta columns that are separated by friezes and accompanied by grate work over each entryway. Between all 11 stories, it has a floor area of approximately 1,000,000 square feet (93,000 m^{2}). It is connected to a nearby building on the same block by a skyway.

== History ==
=== Opening ===
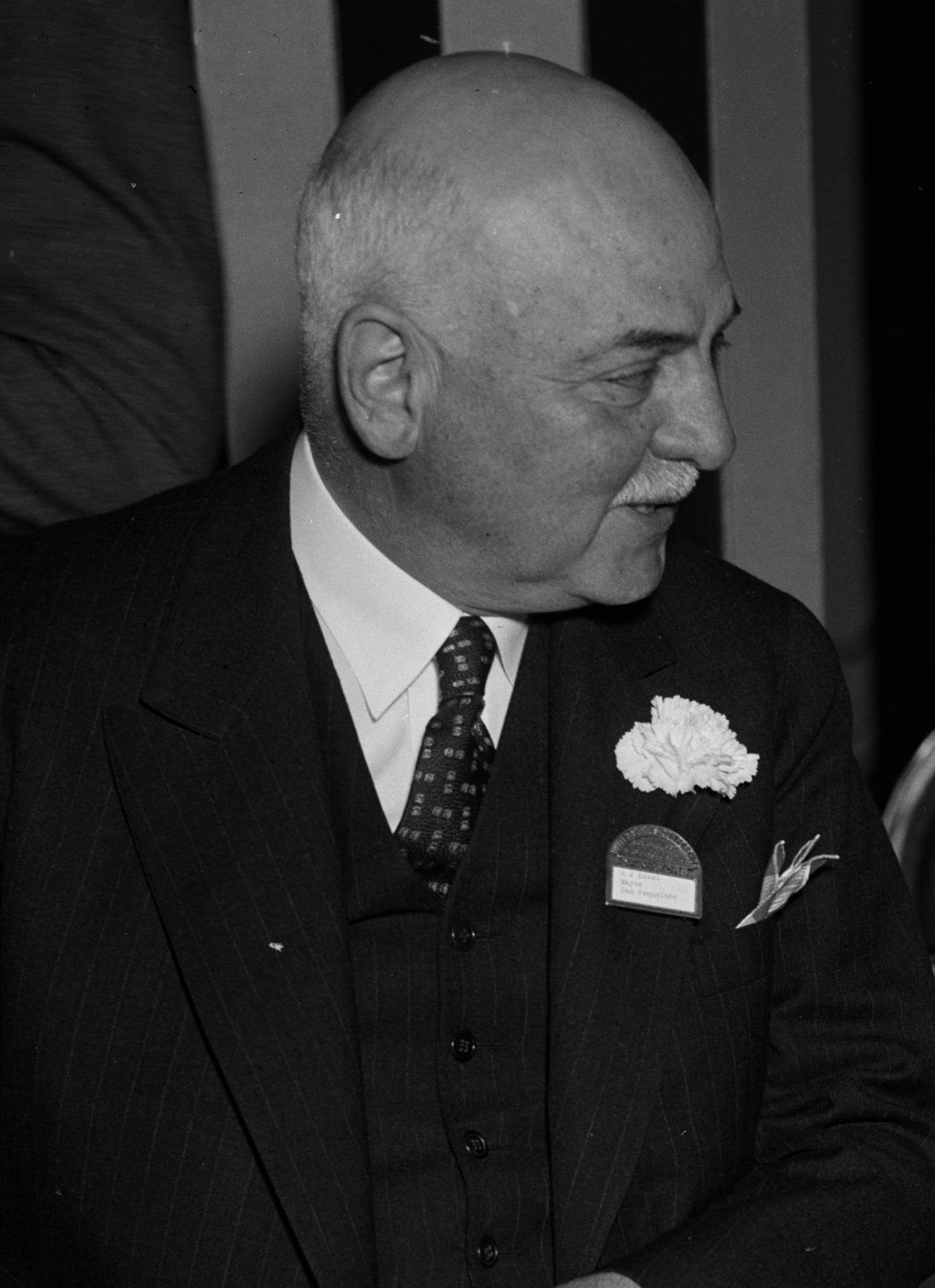
San Francisco Mayor Angelo Joseph Rossi (pictured 1937) spoke at the dedication ceremony for the building on July 31, 1937.

The Western Furniture Exchange and Merchandise Mart, also known as the San Francisco Mart, was completed in mid-1937, after about one year of construction, at a cost of about $3 million (equivalent to $61,000,000 in 2022). It was designed to serve as a trade center for retailers and wholesalers in the furniture industry, and in its initial design, it featured nine floors covering over 600,000 sq ft (56,000 m^{2}) dedicated to showrooms. It was built during a time when trade centers such as this were being constructed in many large cities throughout the United States, such as the Merchandise Mart in Chicago. Additionally, the top floor served as the headquarters for local radio station KSAN, with a large broadcast antenna fixed atop the building. On July 31, a dedication ceremony was held at the building that consisted of a luncheon attended by San Francisco Mayor Angelo Joseph Rossi, who said in a speech, "This building sprang into life in less than a year, constituting San Francisco's answer to the Depression. The new mart captures the old spirit of the West and shows that men still have the courage to dream despite obstacles that may arise". Several days later, on August 3, the mart officially opened, with the keynote speaker for the event being Executive Vice President Roscoe R. Rau of the National Retail Furniture Association.

=== Renovations and sale ===
Over the next several decades after its opening, the building experienced several significant renovations. During World War II, an outdoor patio was reconfigured into a warehouse, with Douglas fir wood being used in place of steel and concrete due to wartime materials rationing. In 1947, the building's owners purchased several adjacent parcels along Ninth Street and built an addition to the building, giving it its L-shaped layout and adding about 220,000 sq ft (20,000 m^{2}) of showroom space. In 1958, the tenth floor of the building was expanded to add more showroom space, while the building's penthouse was expanded and given a new façade. In 1963, an eleventh floor was added to the penthouse. Around this time, the building was purchased by the ADCO Group of New York City. Between 1974 and 1975, Mart 2, a nearby building along Stevenson and Tenth Streets designed by local architect Jorge de Quesada, was constructed and connected to the main building by several skyways. In 1989, the lobby and ground floor underwent a renovation.

=== Decline and reuse ===
Starting in the 1980s, the mart began to wane in popularity, coinciding with a decline in the neighborhood, which was experiencing urban decay. In 1985, given the poor state of the Mid-Market, columnist Herb Caen of the San Francisco Chronicle called the area "Le Grand Pissoir", while a 2022 article in The San Francisco Standard called it "a forlorn cityscape of half-empty buildings, struggling storefronts and troubled people living on the streets". From 2005 to 2008, the number of retailers who actively used the space fell from 300 to 30. This decline was primarily driven by changes in wholesale buying patterns and from increased competition from other wholesaling venues. During this time, a semi-annual trade show that was held at the mart relocated to the World Market Center Las Vegas, while many high-end retailers moved to other boutique venues in San Francisco. Around 2006, ADCO Group considered converting some of the building's upper floors into condominiums, though they ultimately decided against these plans. Instead, the company decided to renovate the building for retail and office space. In January 2008, the company gave notice to the remaining vendors that they would have to vacate the building by the end of the year, after which it would undergo a conversion that was estimated to take about 18 months. This conversion process coincided in part with the Great Recession, which left about half of Mid-Market's offices and 30 percent of the neighborhood's retail centers vacant.

In 2011, the building was purchased from ADCO Group by San Francisco-based Shorenstein Properties for $110 million ($140,000,000 in 2022). According to a spokesperson for Shorenstein, part of the appeal of the building was its resemblance to the Russ Building, a similar Art Deco-Mayan Revival building that served as Shorenstein's headquarters. According to Kristina Shevory of The New York Times, another reason the company, which was "known for its blue-chip office towers in the Financial District", to buy the building was that it offered a significant amount of office space during a time when the available amount in San Francisco was fairly small. Shorenstein continued work on the renovations, ultimately spending approximately $300 million. RMW Architecture and Interiors served as the architectural firm for the project, while BCV Architects + Interiors designed many of the public and retail spaces in the building. They also performed a thorough renovation on Mart 2.

=== Twitter relocates their headquarters ===
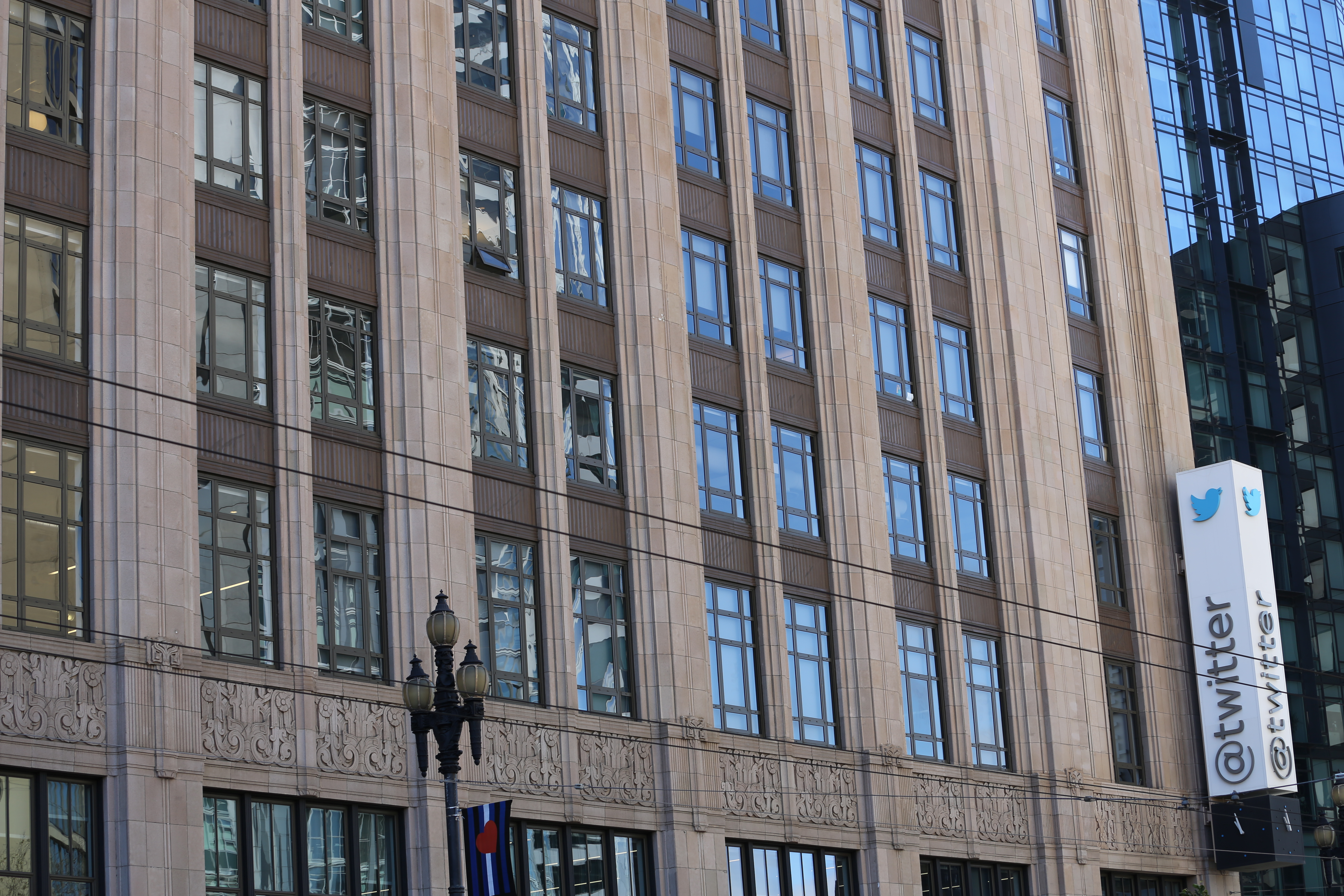
The building in 2016, with a Twitter sign at the intersection of Market and Tenth Streets

Around the same time that Shorenstein was purchasing the property, Twitter, Inc., the company that owned the social networking service Twitter, was in negotiations to relocate its headquarters to the building. At the time, the company, which had been founded in San Francisco in 2006, was based in the South of Market neighborhood, which was home to several other startup companies. However, the company was planning to relocate outside of the city to Brisbane, California, in nearby Silicon Valley, where other technology companies such as Facebook and Google were based. According to Twitter executive Colin Crowell, the company, which was planning to double their staff, did not believe that remaining in San Francisco was optimal given the city's payroll tax. The company had also expressed interest in the mart as a possible new headquarters location, and city leaders such as Mayor Ed Lee brokered a deal that would give companies based in the area around the building a six-year period during which they would not have to pay any payroll tax on new jobs. In addition to keeping Twitter from relocating out of the city, local leaders were hopeful that the tax break deal would encourage more companies to relocate to Mid-Market, leading to an urban renewal of the area, which still had a bad reputation for crime and homelessness.

In April 2011, Twitter announced they would be relocating their headquarters to the building, which was now known as Market Square. Twitter officially completed their relocation in June 2012, occupying the seventh, eighth, and ninth floors. IA Architects and Lundberg Design collaborated on the interior design for the headquarters. The lease, which would last until 2021, gave the company over 200,000 sq ft (19,000 m^{2}) of floor space, with the option to expand if needed. (Note: Sources vary on the exact square footage Twitter received with their lease. A 2013 article in The New York Times states that the lease was for 295,000 sq ft (27,400 m^{2}), while a Los Angeles Times article from the same year states that their initial lease was for 215,000 sq ft (20,000 m^{2}). Additionally, the Los Angeles Times article states that the company paid $35 per square foot in their initial lease and that, as of 2013, the company occupied about 300,000 square feet (28,000 m^{2}) of office space in the building.) Following the move, the building became locally known as the "Twitter Building", while the surrounding area was nicknamed "Twitterloin", a portmanteau of Twitter and the nearby Tenderloin neighborhood.

In 2015, Shorenstein began to seek offers for the property, and in August of that year, they sold a 98 percent stake in the building to the asset management division of JPMorgan Chase, with a valuation of $920 million. At the time, in addition to Twitter, which was still the majority leaseholder, other tenants in the building included Yammer, a social networking service owned by Microsoft, and several fine dining restaurants in the building's lower levels. In 2017, a new skyway was added to connect Market Square to Mart 2, as the previous bridge had been removed in 2011 due to not being compliant with the Americans with Disabilities Act of 1990.

=== Acquisition of Twitter by Elon Musk ===
In 2022, Twitter was purchased by business magnate Elon Musk in a $44 billion deal. In April of that year, prior to the acquisition, Musk had tweeted about converting Twitter's headquarters into a homeless shelter, which generated some support from fellow business magnate Jeff Bezos. In December of that year, following the acquisition, the New York Post reported that Musk could relocate Twitter's headquarters from San Francisco following an incident wherein the city launched a probe into possible zoning violations performed by the company. At the time, the company occupied 379,000 sq ft (35,200 m^{2}) at Market Square, with a lease scheduled to end in 2028. In November 2022, Musk fired roughly half of the company's 7,500-person workforce, which was followed by a mass resignation of several hundred Twitter employees in response to Musk's leadership. Around this time, on November 17, an activist projected signs onto the side of the building that were critical of Musk. By January 2023, Twitter's physical presence in the building had declined from six floors to just two floors. That same month, a lawsuit was filed in a California superior court alleging that the company had failed to pay rent for both December 2022 and January 2023 on the Market Square property. The lawsuit, filed by the building's landlords, additionally accused the company of violating the letter of credit stipulation in their lease.

In July 2023, Musk initiated a rebrand of the website from Twitter to X, and on the morning of July 24, a large logo X was projected onto the side of the building. That same month, Musk announced that the company's headquarters would remain in San Francisco, saying in a post on the website:

Many have offered rich incentives for X (fka Twitter) to move its HQ out of San Francisco. Moreover, the city is in a doom spiral with one company after another left or leaving. Therefore, they expect X will move too. We will not. You only know who your real friends are when the chips are down. San Francisco, beautiful San Francisco, though others forsake you, we will always be your friend.

In late July 2023, a large metal X sign was installed atop the building. This sign was later dismantled and removed after the city issued a notice of violation. Prior to this, the San Francisco Police Department had stopped workers from removing a Twitter sign off of the building because they had not properly secured the worksite before beginning the dismantling.

In July 2024, The San Francisco Standard reported that X was subleasing a significant portion of their headquarter space at Market Square and utilizing only a small portion of the building for their remaining "skeleton crew". By the following month, the company released an internal email saying that they would be leaving Market Square over the next few weeks. The email was sent out several weeks after Musk had publicly expressed interest in moving X's headquarters to Austin, Texas, though the email said that employees at the Market Square location would be relocated to either an X office in San Jose or a shared space with xAI, another Musk-owned company, in Palo Alto. X officially left Market Square in September 2024.
