= Mike Douglass (urban planner) =

Mike Douglass is an American urban planner scholar and social scientist known for his exploration of rural-urban linkages, migration and international economic competition, focusing on globalization and the rise of civil society in Asia. He is currently on 5-year joint appointment as professor with the Asia Research Institute and Lee Kuan Yew School for Public Policy, National University of Singapore (NUS).

Prior to NUS, Douglass was the director of The Globalization Research Center as well as a professor and department chair of urban and regional planning, University of Hawaii. He received a Ph.D. in urban planning at UCLA in 1982. He previously taught at the Institute of Social Studies in the Hague and the School of Development Studies, University of East Anglia, UK. He was also a visiting professor at Stanford University, UCLA, and Thammasat University.

== Awards and honors ==
- 2004 Visiting scholar at the Asia Research Institute, National University of Singapore
- 2001-2002 Excellence in Research award from the College of Social, University of Hawaii
- 2002 Stellar Ph.D. Alumni, Department of Urban Planning, UCLA
- 2001 Fulbright Senior Specialist
- 2000 Meyer Fellowship, National University of Singapore
- 2000 Visiting Professor and Scholar at Stanford University
- 1998 Shorenstein Distinguished Lecturer, Institute for International Studies, Stanford University
- 1998 Rockefeller Foundation Scholar at Bellagio
- 1996 Perloff Chair in Urban Planning at UCLA
- 1993–present Senior Research Fellow/Adjunct Fellow, Program on Environment, East-West Center
- 1985 Japan Society for Promotion of Science (Gakujitsu Shinkokai) Visiting Scholar, Tokyo University
- The University of Hawaii identifies him as one of its 90 fabulous faculty.

== Publications ==
Editorial work, research reports, unpublished thesis

- 2018 Mike Douglass, Rita Padawangi, Yves Cabannes; eds., Cities in Asia by and for the People (Amsterdam University Press)
- 2003 Mike Douglass and Glenda Roberts, eds., Japan and Global Migration: Foreign Workers and the Advent of a Multicultural Society (Honolulu: Reprint by University of Hawaii Press).
- 2002 Mike Douglass, ed., “Special Issue on Globalization and Civic Space in Pacific Asia,” International Development Planning Review, 24:4, Nov., includes 6 articles.
- 2002 Mike Douglas and Mike DiGregorio with Valuncha Pichaya, Pornpan Boonchuen, Made Brunner, Wiwik Bunjamin, Dan Foster, Scott Handler, Rizky Komalasari, and Kana Taniguchi, The Urban Transition in Vietnam (Honolulu, Fukuoka and Hanoi: UNCHS/UNDP and University of Hawaii, Department of Urban and Regional Planning).
- 2000 Mike Douglass and Glenda Roberts, eds., Japan and Global Migration: Foreign Workers and the Advent of a Multicultural Society (London: Routledge).
- 1998 Mike Douglass and John Friedmann, eds., Cities for Citizens: Planning and the Rise of Civil Society in a Global Age (London: John Wiley).
- 1997 Won Bae Kim, Mike Douglass, and Sung-Chuel Choe, eds., Culture and the City in East Asia (Oxford University Press).
- 1996 Mike Douglass, Sustainable Human Settlements: Challenge of the Transition in Eastern Europe and the Commonwealth of Independent States (New York: UNDP for the Habitat II Conference, Istanbul).
- 1995 Mike Douglass, Urban Poverty and Policy Alternatives in Asia (Kuala Lumpur: UNDP/Asia-Pacific 2000/ UNESCAP report).
- 1991 Mike Douglass, Urbanization in China: Comparative Asia Perspective (in Chinese) (Beijing: Helongjiang People's Publishing Housing).
- 1987 Mike Douglass, Transnational Capital and Urbanization in Japan (Sydney: University of Sydney, Faculty of Economics, Transnational Corporations Research Project, Research Report 25).
- 1987 Mike Douglass and John Friedmann, eds., Transnational Capital and Urbanization on the Pacific Rim; Proceedings from a Conference (L.A.: UCLA Center for Pacific Rim Studies).
- 1984 Hiran Dias, Mike Douglass, João Guimaraes, Richard Vokes, eds., Rural Development and Regional Planning in the 80's (Bangkok: Asian Institute of Technology).
- 1983 Mike Douglass, Regional Integration on the Capitalist Periphery: the Central Plains of Thailand (The Hague: Institute of Social Studies, Research Report).
- 1982 Mike Douglass, The Political Economy of Regional Integration: The Central Plains of Thailand, 1850-1980 (Los Angeles: Unpublished Ph.D. Dissertation, UCLA School of Architecture and Urban Planning).
