= Curran Theatre =

Building in San Francisco, California, US

- Location within San Francisco County
- Address: 445 Geary Street; San Francisco, California
- Coordinates: 37.786972°N 122.410631°W
- Owner: Carole Shorenstein Hays
- Operator: ATG Entertainment
- Capacity: 1,667

Construction
- Opened: 1922

Website
- us.atgtickets.com/venues/curran-theater/whats-on/

The Curran Theatre, located at 445 Geary Street between Taylor and Mason Streets in the Theatre District of San Francisco, California, opened in February 1922, and was named after its first owner, Homer Curran. As of 2025, the theater is owned by the San Francisco Giants.

== History ==
Playbill featuring Will Rogers in Eugene O'Neill's Ah, Wilderness! from 1934

American theatrical producer Homer Curran operated another theater with his name for several years, prior to building this Curran Theatre; however, the original Curran Theatre (opened as the Cort Theatre in 1911) had various names before and after this time, whereas this Curran Theatre has never had another name. It opened in February 1922 and was initially a Shubert house. Later, it was a showcase for Theatre Guild presentations. Subsequently, it became closely associated with the San Francisco Civic Light Opera (CLO), which also operated the Los Angeles Civic Light Opera. The CLO obtained numerous prestigious bookings and produced their own shows, often with stars as the lead roles.

Curran wrote the book for the musical Song of Norway and co-wrote the book for Magdalena. He eventually left San Francisco for Southern California, where he rented theatrical lighting. For many years, the San Francisco Opera performed its annual "Spring Opera" series at the Curran.

In 1977, the Civic Light Opera shifted its operations to the Orpheum Theatre, and by the end of that year, Carole Shorenstein Hays and James M. Nederlander assumed operation of the Curran and launched their Best of Broadway season starting with John Raitt in the national tour of Shenandoah and including the West Coast debut of Annie. Later, Shorenstein changed the name of her organization to SHN. In 2015 Shorenstein left SHN, focusing her attention solely on the Curran. SHN no longer operates the Curran.

The theatre closed in September 2015 for renovations. Work included new upholstery for seats, carpeting, mechanical and electrical systems as well as expanded and upgraded lobbies. While work was underway, the theatre presented non-traditional works in a series called Under Construction in which the audience entered and was seated on the stage. The Curran reopened on January 25, 2017, with the musical Fun Home.

== Architecture and interior ==
The ceiling above the main lobby was hand-painted to look like wood (steel wool was used to fashion a wood grain effect in the plaster before painting). The main lobby has a marble floor but has long since been covered by carpeting. There are "plugs" built into the lobby floor in which to insert stanchions from which theater ropes were hung to section off the lobby. The loge section was modified prior to Hello, Dolly!'s first booking at the theater. Originally, the loge section was similar to the boxes, with movable chairs in sectioned areas. The box-like loges are still evident by what remains of the metal railings in front of the loge section as well as the decorative plaster when viewed from below. The change was made because it increased the seating capacity by about ten seats in this highly desirable area. The interior main floor lobby no longer exists. Originally, it was changed to a minor degree to accommodate the installation of a sound booth without decreasing the orchestra seating capacity. Eventually, the lobby space was used to install a larger bar area as well as accessible restrooms.

The theater has two front curtains: the decorative green fire curtain in front of a gold curtain. When musicals traditionally utilized each theater's front curtains, the first curtain would be raised five minutes prior to the start of the show. There were two coat check rooms: one off to the south of the main floor interior lobby and the other on the balcony (adjacent to the ladies' restroom). There were also two telephone "booths" on the mezzanine lobby—one on each side of the windows. These booths were actually very small rooms with formal doors. The coat check rooms and telephone booths are now used for storage. The theater also had a central vacuum system. This system is still evident by the connection points on the walls, near the floor. The chandelier was built in San Francisco by Phoenix Day. A plaque honoring Arthur Mayer is mounted at the entrance to boxes L-M-N. Mayer watched the theater being built, was hired by Curran as part of the theater's opening-night staff, and continued working at the theater until he was nearly 100 years old.

== Productions ==
The Curran has hosted more pre-Broadway engagements than any other theater in San Francisco. Productions that have been staged at the Curran prior to moving to Broadway have included A Chorus Line revival (2006), Beautiful: The Carole King Musical (2013), Biloxi Blues (1985), Brighton Beach Memoirs (1983), Carnival in Flanders (1953), Dame Edna: Back With a Vengeance (2004), Fences (1987), Gigi (1973), Head Over Heels (2018), Home Sweet Homer (Odyssey) (1975), Hugh Jackman in Performance (2011), Jitney (2002), Kismet (1953), La Boheme (Baz Luhrmann's production) (2002), Lennon (2006), Lestat (2005–2006), Magdalena: a Musical Adventure (1948), Martin Short: Fame Becomes Me (2006), Oliver! (1962), Peter Pan (1954), Pickwick (1965), Ring of Fire (2006), Soft Power (2018), The Grand Tour (1978), Three Wishes for Jamie (1951), White Christmas (2004–2005), and Wicked (2003). Zenda (Alfred Drake, Chita Rivera, Vernon Duke) world premiere 1963, Oliver! (American premiere: 1962, Jollyanna (revision of Flahooley) 1952, At the Grand (Paul Muni, Grand Hotel musical), 1958, Dumas and Son (1967), 1491 (Chita Rivera, John Cullum), 1969, Gone With the Wind (American premiere) 1973.

Broadway national tours have played at the Curran Theatre throughout its history. As operated by SHN, the Curran hosted five years of Andrew Lloyd Webber's The Phantom of the Opera, becoming the show's longest domestic run outside of New York City. Other significant long runs presented by SHN at the Curran include Les Misérables, Jersey Boys, They're Playing Our Song, as well as Lily Tomlin in Jane Wagner's The Search for Signs of Intelligent Life in the Universe.

Harry Potter and the Cursed Child began at the Curran in December 2019. During its run, Ambassador Theatre Group is set to operate the theatre.

== In popular culture ==
- In the 1950s, the theater was used for the interior and exterior scenes of a Broadway theater in the movie All About Eve. The original main-floor interior lobby can be seen in this film. All the theater scenes were filmed at the Curran except for the dressing room interior.
- The television series The Streets of San Francisco filmed an episode inside and outside the Curran. In the program, the Curran is used as the setting for A.C.T. In reality, A.C.T. operates at the adjacent Geary Theatre which is also visible in some shots.

== See also ==
- Golden Gate Theatre
- Orpheum Theatre
