= Mid-Market, San Francisco =

Neighborhood in San Francisco, California

Mid-Market
- Neighborhood of San Francisco
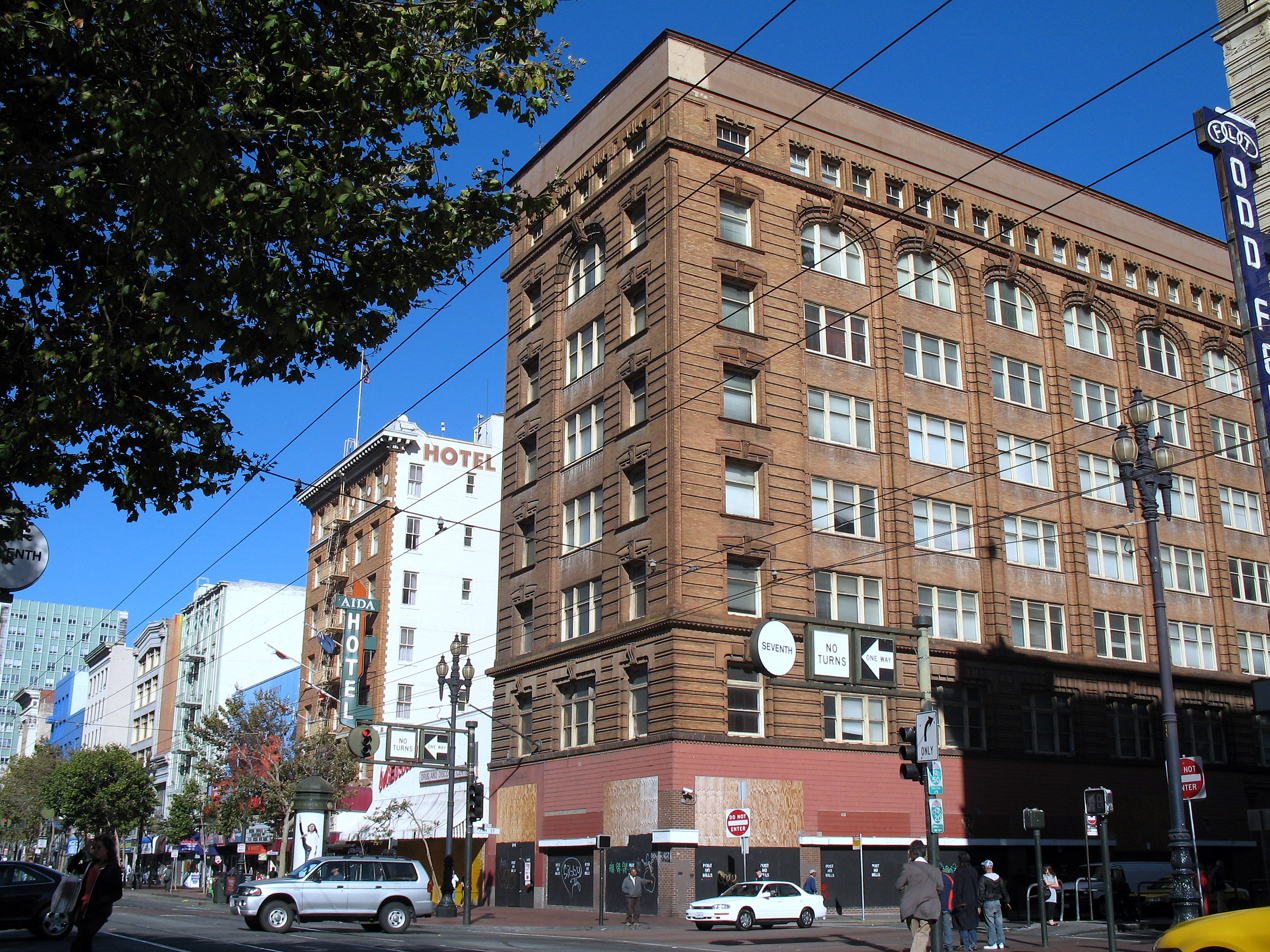
- South side of Market Street between Sixth Street and Seventh Street

- Location in San Francisco
- Coordinates: 37.780518°N 122.412534°W
- Country: United States
- State: California
- City-county: San Francisco

Area
  - Total: 0.067 sq mi (0.17 km^{2})

Population
  - Total: 2,170
  - Density: 32,000/sq mi (13,000/km^{2})

Economics
  - Median income: $102,321
- Time zone: UTC−8 (Pacific)
  - Summer (DST): UTC−7 (PDT)
- ZIP Codes: 94103
- Area codes: 415 and 628
- Market Street Theatre and Loft District
- U.S. National Register of Historic Places
- U.S. Historic district
- California Historical Landmark
- Location within San Francisco County Location within California
- Location: Roughly bounded by 982-1112 Market Street (NW side), 973-1105 Market Street (SW side), One Jones Street and 1-35 Taylor Street
- Area: 13.1 acres (5.3 ha)
- Architects: James Rupert Miller, et al.
- Architectural style: Chicago school
- NRHP reference No.: 86000729
- CHISL No.: N1436

Significant dates
- Added to NRHP: April 10, 1986
- Delisted CHISL: April 10, 1986

Mid-Market (also Central Market, and Market Street Theatre and Loft District) is a neighborhood, historic district and development area in San Francisco, California. The neighborhood is bounded by Market Street to the north, 5th Street to the east, Mission Street to the south, and Van Ness Avenue to the west. There are many theaters in the district, most of which began as vaudeville theaters, include the Warfield and Golden Gate.

In 1906, Mid-Market was decimated by the 1906 San Francisco earthquake, and over the next century, Mid-Market would rebuild itself. In the 21st century, Mid-Market has served as a major economic area for San Francisco. Mid-Market has contained the headquarters for Twitter, Block, Reddit, Zendesk, Uber, and Dolby, as well as historic buildings, such as the Old San Francisco Mint, the James R. Browning United States Courthouse, and the San Francisco Federal Building.

Mid-Market is part of California's 11th congressional district, as of 2021.

The "Market Street Theatre and Loft District" was listed on the National Register of Historic Places on April 10, 1986, for the architecture, and its events and commerce history; and is listed as a California Historical Landmark since 1986. It has twenty contributing buildings and covers 13.1 acres (5.3 ha).

== Geography ==
The Mid-Market redevelopment area is centered on Market Street starting at Fifth Street, ending at Van Ness Avenue, and including a number of buildings down to Mission Street. It effectively creates a sub-neighborhood of the Tenderloin, SoMa, and Civic Center neighborhoods for the purpose of redeveloping the area.

The historic district is roughly bounded by 982–1112 Market Street (NW side), 973–1105 Market Street (SW side). One Jones Street and 1–35 Taylor Street.

== History ==
=== Early history ===
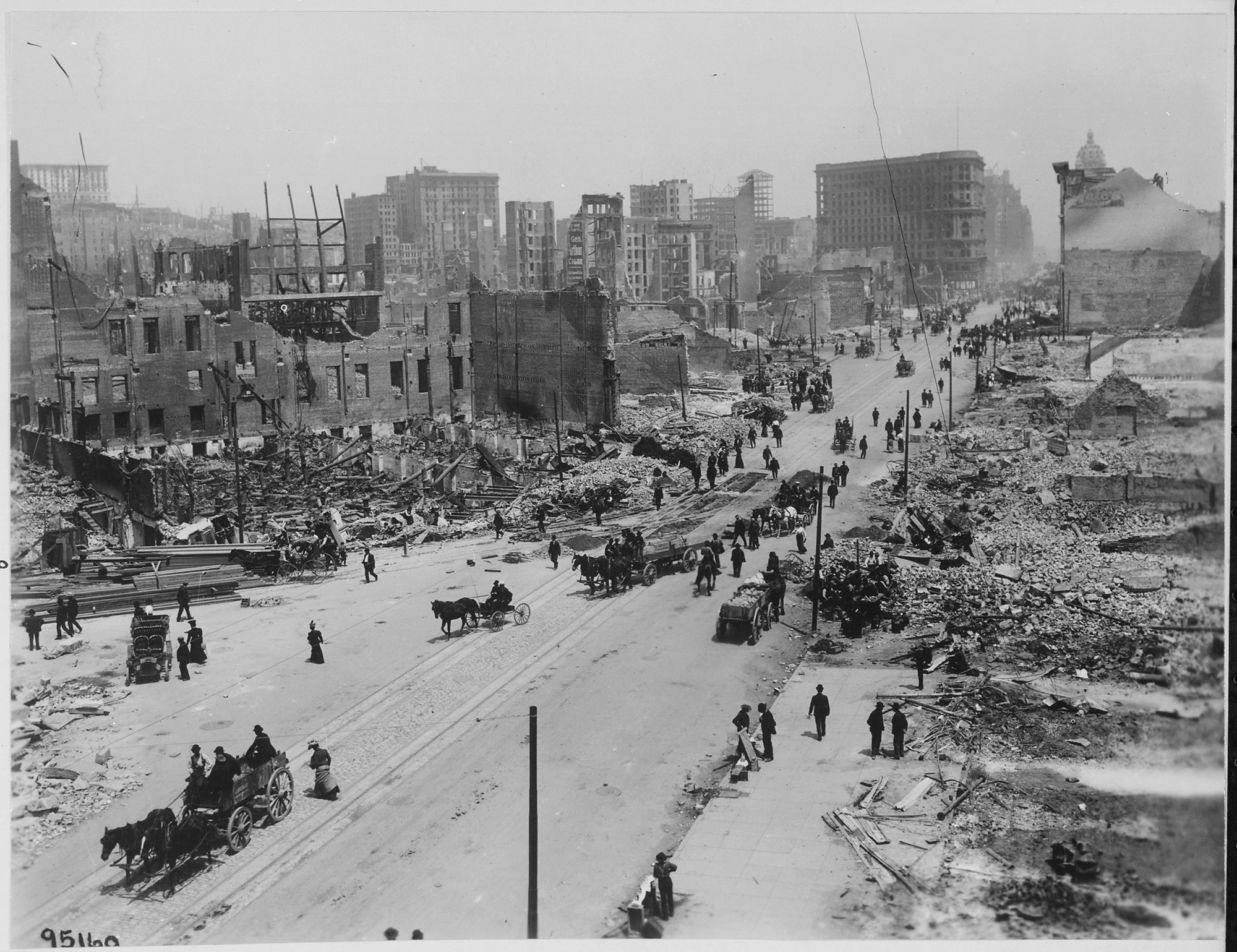
View of Mid-Market, following the 1906 San Francisco earthquake

Decimated by the 1906 earthquake and fire, the entire neighborhood was quickly rebuilt and for decades served as vibrant portion of the Market Street corridor.

Noted columnist Herb Caen referred to the neighborhood as 'le grand pissoir' because of the amount of public urination, defecation, and vagrancy due to a consolidation and expansion of homeless social services in the area, starting in the mid-1980s.

=== Economic growth ===
Past initiatives such as sponsored street murals have had little effect in revitalizing the neighborhood and in 2011 the city government turned to tax incentives to encourage businesses to move to the area. It has a history of issues with public drug usage and homelessness, which has impacted businesses.

The neighborhood was affected by the controversial "Twitter Tax Break" spearheaded in 2011 by Mayor Ed Lee, which brought new companies and new construction to the neighborhood. The largest and most noteworthy of businesses in modern history has been Twitter, which moved into the old San Francisco Mart building (now known as Market Square) at Ninth and Market streets in 2012. The move by Twitter was initially met with a great deal of controversy, while other businesses such as Zendesk quietly took advantage of the tax break and moved to the area. A number of arts groups, such as the Black Rock Arts Foundation, are working to move to Mid-Market. In October 2013, Square moved its headquarters to the mid-Market area, followed by Uber and Dolby. Reddit moved its corporate headquarters to Mid-Market in October 2019, in an area leased to Uber and Square.

Equally transformative, and often attributed to the new density of tech headquarters in Mid-Market, has been the concurrent increase of residential buildings, most notably high-rise apartments and condominium towers.

=== Economic decline ===
Like the rest of downtown San Francisco, Mid-Market was hit badly by the COVID-19 pandemic in 2020 and the subsequent shift to remote work. As of May 2024, the vacancy rate in the Mid-Market area had skyrocketed to 46%, according to CBRE research, which was significantly higher than the citywide vacancy rate of 36.7%. Sellers of real estate in the Mid-Market area were offering discounts as much as 70% from peak prices. A 16-story tower purchased for $62 million in 2016 went for only $6.5 million at a foreclosure auction in 2024.

By August 2025, the San Francisco Centre immediately to the northeast of the neighborhood was in severe decline. The New York Times described the dying mall as "a national symbol of the city's pandemic-battered downtown", which was struggling "with homelessness and open-air drug use".

== List of notable buildings ==
- de Laveage Building (1906), 1023 Market Street
- Delger Building (1907), 1001–1005 Market Street
- Eastern Outfitting Co. Building (1909), 1017 Market Street; designed by George Applegarth
- Ede Building (1910), 1061 Market Street
- Egyptian Theatre (1924), 1067–1071 Market Street
- Federal Hotel (1912), 1083–1087 Market Street
- Forrest Building (1908), 1053–1055 Market Street; designed by George Applegarth
- Globe Investment Company Building (1909), 1063 Market Street
- Golden Gate Building (1906), 1028–1056 Market Street
- Golden Gate Theatre (1922), 1 Taylor Street; designed by G. Albert Lansburgh
- Grant Building (1902), 1095–1097 Market Street
- Hale Brothers Department Store (1900), 979–989 Market Street; NRHP-listed
- Hibernia Bank Building (1889), 1 Jones Street; SFDL-listed, and designed by Albert Pissis
- Hotel Shaw (1926), 1100–1112 Market Street
- Odd Fellows Hall (1909), 6-26 Seventh Street
- Prager's Department Store (1910), 1072–1098 Market Street
- San Christian Building (1913), 1000-1016 Market Street
- Sterling Building (1907), 1049 Market Street
- Walker Building (1911), 1007–1009 Market Street
- Warfield Theatre (1922), 982 Market Street
- Wilson Building (1901), 1369 Post Street; designed by Willis Polk

== See also ==
- National Register of Historic Places listings in San Francisco
- California Historical Landmarks in San Francisco
