= The Journalist's Resource =

Journalism website

- Website type: Journalism, Academia
- Available in: English
- Owners: Shorenstein Center on Media, Politics and Public Policy, Harvard Kennedy School, Harvard University
- Key people: Carmen Nobel (Program Director and Editor-in-Chief) Denise-Marie Ordway (Managing Editor) Clark Merrefield (Senior Editor, Economics and Legal Systems Naseem Miller (Senior Editor, Health)
- Website: journalistsresource.org
- Commercial: No
- Registration: None
- Launched: 2010; 16 years ago
- Current status: Active

The Journalist's Resource is a website that aims to connect journalists with information about recently published academic studies. A project of the Shorenstein Center on Media, Politics and Public Policy at Harvard Kennedy School, the website features summaries of academic studies written in a journalistic, story-centered style. It was launched in 2010, originally to make it easier for journalism professors to teach about reporting on academic studies, and was redesigned in 2011. It is operated by faculty, staff, and graduate students through the Carnegie-Knight Initiative, a partnership between the Carnegie Corporation of New York and the John S. and James L. Knight Foundation.

The website has been recognized by the American Library Association for the quality of work made available on the site.
