= BroadwaySF =

Commercial theatrical production company in San Francisco

BroadwaySF is a commercial theatrical production company in San Francisco.

== History ==
It was founded in 1977 by Broadway producers Carole Shorenstein Hays and Robert Nederlander as Shorenstein Hays Nederlander Theatre (later abbreviated to SHN) as a promoter of short engagements of national touring productions of plays and musicals. BroadwaySF owns and operates two historic theatres in San Francisco: the Orpheum and Golden Gate Theatres and previously operated the Curran Theatre until 2014. BroadwaySF also consults on the Broadway series at the AT&T Performing Arts Center in Dallas.

On October 1, 2019, SHN changed its name to BroadwaySF in the aftermath of a lawsuit between itself and founder Hays, who had given up an active role in the organization. Hays continued to hold a 50% stake in SHN until then, when she gave up her stake as a part of the settlement.

In March 2021, BroadwaySF was acquired by ATG Entertainment (formerly known as the Ambassador Theatre Group), a global live entertainment company. This acquisition included the Golden Gate Theatre and the Orpheum Theatre in San Francisco, as well as the Fisher Theatre in Detroit and programming operations at the Detroit Opera House and Music Hall. The transaction marked a significant expansion of ATG's presence in the United States, bringing these historic venues under its management. BroadwaySF continues to operate under the ATG umbrella.

== Notable productions ==
BroadwaySF has hosted the world premieres and pre-Broadway engagements of numerous shows, including: Wicked, Mamma Mia!, Baz Luhrmann's La Bohème, the 2006 revival of A Chorus Line, Legally Blonde: The Musical, and a new musical stage version of Irving Berlin's White Christmas. BroadwaySF engagements have started the national tours of Jersey Boys, Spring Awakening, the Lincoln Center revival of Rodgers and Hammerstein's South Pacific, Avenue Q, Edward Scissorhands, and The Light in the Piazza, all immediately following their Broadway runs. BroadwaySF has presented the West Coast premieres of Caroline, or Change, I Am My Own Wife, Spamalot, The Color Purple, and August: Osage County which won the Pulitzer Prize.

Wicked returned to San Francisco after a two-year run, Jersey Boys, The Lion King, and Les Misérables each played for over a year; and The Phantom of the Opera with a five-year run that set records.
