= Joan Shorenstein =

American journalist

- Born: 1947
- Died: March 10, 1985 (aged 38)
- Occupation: Journalist
- Notable credit(s): The Washington Post, CBS News
- Spouse: Michael Barone
- Children: 1
- Parent(s): Phyllis Finley Shorenstein; Walter Shorenstein
- Relatives: Carole Shorenstein Hays (sister); Douglas W. Shorenstein (brother); Hyman Schorenstein (uncle)

Joan Shorenstein (1947 – March 10, 1985) was an American journalist for The Washington Post and producer for CBS News.

She died of cancer in 1985 at the age of 38.

== Early life ==
Shorenstein was born in San Francisco as one of three children of real estate developer Walter Shorenstein and Phyllis Finley. Her father was born Jewish and her mother converted to Judaism. She had two siblings: Broadway producer Carole Shorenstein Hays and real estate investor Douglas W. Shorenstein, the chairman of the board of directors of the Federal Reserve Bank of San Francisco. Shorenstein obtained her degree from Mills College, where she was elected to Phi Beta Kappa. She later did graduate work at Harvard Divinity School. In 1970, she was recommended to work as a political researcher for The Washington Post.

== Career ==
Shorenstein began working for The Washington Post with no prior journalism experience. She left the Post in 1973 and began working for CBS News. She quickly worked her way up after just a year, becoming the associate producer of Face the Nation, and in 1979 she was appointed to producer.

== Family ==
In 1975, she married Michael Barone, a senior writer for U.S. News & World Report. They had one daughter, Sarah.

In 1985 Joan Shorenstein died of breast cancer and the following year, her parents donated $5 million to Harvard University to establish what is now known as the Shorenstein Center on Media, Politics and Public Policy. It is currently run by Nancy Gibbs, former editor in chief of Time and former editorial director of the Time Inc. News Group.

== See also ==
- Shorenstein Prize
- Joan Shorenstein Barone Award
