= Shorenstein Center on Media, Politics and Public Policy =

Harvard University research center

- Established: 1986
- Parent institution: Harvard Kennedy School
- Director: Nancy Gibbs
- Location: Cambridge, Massachusetts, U.S.
- Campus: Urban
- Website: ShorensteinCenter.org

The Shorenstein Center on Media, Politics and Public Policy is a Harvard Kennedy School research center that explores the intersection and impact of media, politics and public policy in theory and practice.

Among other activities, the center organizes dozens of yearly events for journalists, scholars and the public, many of which take place at the John F. Kennedy Jr. Forum. Courses taught by Shorenstein Center professors are also an integral part of the Harvard Kennedy School's curriculum.

Since its founding in 1986, the center has also emerged as a source for research on US campaigns, elections and journalism. The center hosts visiting fellows each semester, who produce research on a broad range of topics. Papers have included "Riptide: What Really Happened to the News Business", by John Huey, Martin Nisenholtz and Paul Sagan; "Did Twitter Kill the Boys on the Bus?" by Peter Hamby of CNN and Snapchat; and "Digital Fuel of the 21st Century", by Vivek Kundra, who was the first chief information officer of the United States from March 2009 to August 2011 under President Barack Obama. In 2016, the center produced a series of four reports analyzing media coverage of the 2016 US presidential election, authored by Thomas E. Patterson, Bradlee Professor of Government and the Press.

The Shorenstein Center also awards the annual Goldsmith Awards Program, which includes the Goldsmith Prize for Investigative Reporting and the Goldsmith Book Prize. Past winners have included James Risen and Eric Lichtblau of The New York Times; Patricia Callahan, Sam Roe and Michael Hawthorne of the Chicago Tribune; and Debbie Cenziper and Sarah Cohen of The Washington Post. Other prizes and lectures given by the Shorenstein Center include the David Nyhan Prize for Political Journalism, the T.H. White Lecture on Press and Politics and the Richard S. Salant Lecture on Freedom of the Press.

== History ==
The John F. Kennedy School of Government has always recognized that engagement with the media should be part of the school's focus, and initially this role was fulfilled by the Harvard Institute of Politics (IOP). In 1974 Jonathan Moore became the institute's director, and under him the IOP sponsored conferences and invited journalists to Harvard as fellows. In 1980 Moore drafted a proposal for a Harvard center on the press, politics and public policy. Kennedy School dean Graham Allison and Harvard president Derek Bok supported the concept, and an advisory board and committee were formed. Those consulted included political scientist Richard Neustadt; attorney and educator David Riesman; journalists James C. Thomson Jr., David S. Broder, J. Anthony Lukas and Dan Rather; newspaper executives Otis Chandler, Katharine Graham and William O. Taylor II; researcher Stephen H. Hess; Foreign Affairs editor James F. Hoge, Jr.; and television executive Frank Stanton . An endowment fund was created by the IOP, and other donations came from the Boston Globe, Cox Enterprises, Walter Cronkite and General Electric. In all, these efforts raised $5 million for professorships, programs and fellowships.

In March 1985, Joan Shorenstein, a producer of the CBS Evening News with Dan Rather, died of cancer at age 38. Her parents, Walter H. and Phyllis J. Shorenstein, were interested in creating an initiative that would honor their daughter's passion for journalism and politics, and spoke with Edward M. Kennedy, Allison, Bok and Moore. The Shorensteins' gave an initial gift of $5 million, and the Joan Shorenstein Center on Press, Politics and Public Policy officially opened in September 1986. At the ceremony an address was given by Benjamin C. Bradlee, with remarks by Senator Kennedy, Walter H. Shorenstein and others.

Two years after the Shorenstein Center's founding, veteran journalist Marvin Kalb became its director. He worked to raise the center's profile, and under his leadership the Theodore H. White Lecture on Press and Politics was established, followed by the Goldsmith Prize for Investigative Reporting. Kalb directed the center until 1999, and during that time formalized its fellowship program; developed the introductory course on press, politics and public policy; and expanded the Kennedy School's curriculum.

On July 1, 2000, Pulitzer Prize–winning journalist Alex S. Jones was named director of the Shorenstein Center. Since taking over, he has enhanced the fellowship program, launched initiatives to increase student engagement and broadened the advisory board. The Shorenstein Center is one of the most active programs at the Harvard Kennedy School, and has hosted more than a thousand speakers since 1986.

It is currently run by Nancy Gibbs, former editor in chief of Time and former editorial director of the Time Inc. News Group.

== Shorenstein Center fellows ==
The Shorenstein Center traditionally hosts 5–6 fellows per semester. These fellows are well-established practitioners in media, politics and public policy. They serve as mentors to students and hold study groups to share their experiences with the Harvard Kennedy School community more broadly. Each fellow produces a final research paper that contributes to ideas and innovation in their respective areas of expertise. Past fellows have included Maria Ressa, Bob Schieffer, Richard Stengel and Judy Woodruff.

== Combating fake news and Harvard Kennedy School Misinformation Review ==
In September 2017, First Draft News, a non-profit that works on solutions to challenges with trust & truth in news, set up a home base at the Shorenstein Center. The network includes more than 100 organizations that help newsrooms & tech companies verify news. This announcement is part of the Shorenstein Center's broader work and research in the area of combatting fake news.

In February 2017, the Shorenstein Center hosted a conference on fake news, bringing together academics and practitioners to discuss solutions to the problem. The conference was co-sponsored by the Ash Center for Democratic Governance and Innovation, as well as Northeastern University.

In response to online misinformation, the Shorenstein Center created the Harvard Kennedy School Misinformation Review, a peer-reviewed, open-access journal.

== The Journalist's Resource ==
The Journalist's Resource is a free reference website based at the Shorenstein Center. It makes leading media research and insights on topical news items available to journalists, bloggers, students and professors. Peer-reviewed research is central to its mandate and day-to-day offerings. The resource has been recognized by the American Library Association for the quality of work made available on the site.

== See also ==
- Hard Choices (Moore book)
- Joan Shorenstein Barone Award
- Walter Shorenstein
- Douglas W. Shorenstein
