= Shorenstein Properties =

American real estate investment firm

Shorenstein
- Company type: Private
- Predecessor: Milton Meyer & Company
- Founder: Walter Shorenstein
- Headquarters: San Francisco
- Key people: Brandon J. Shorenstein, (Chairman & CEO); Glenn A. Shannon, (Vice-Chairman; Charles W. Malet, (President and Chief Investment Officer)
- Website: www.shorenstein.com

Shorenstein is a real estate investment company based in San Francisco that owns interests in 23 million square feet (2.1×10^{6} m^{2}) of office space throughout the United States. The company has sponsored twelve closed-end real estate funds, with total equity commitments of $8.8 billion, including $723.5 million from the company.

The main office of the social media company Twitter at 1355 Market Street, San Francisco, belongs to Shorenstein, as was reported when Twitter was in arrear for paying rent.

== History ==
In 1946, after being discharged from the military, Walter Shorenstein joined Milton Meyer & Company, which was later renamed Shorenstein Company.

In the early 1990s, Walter Shorenstein stepped back from day-to-day operations of the company. His son, Douglas W. Shorenstein, became chief executive officer of the company in 1995. Walter Shorenstein died in 2010 at age 95 and Douglas Shorenstein died at age 60 of cancer in 2015. In 2020, Brandon Shorenstein, Doug's son, was named chairman and CEO.

Shorenstein, purchased the Aon Center in 2014, and sold the building to a consortium of investors including Carolwood in December 2023.
