= Douglas W. Shorenstein =

American lawyer

- Born: February 10, 1955; San Francisco
- Died: November 24, 2015 (aged 60)
- Education: B.A. University of California, Berkeley; J.D. University of California, Hastings College of the Law
- Occupation: Real estate development
- Known for: Chairman of the board of directors of the Federal Reserve Bank of San Francisco; CEO of Shorenstein Properties
- Spouse: Lydia Preisler
- Children: 3
- Parent(s): Phyllis Finley Shorenstein; Walter Shorenstein
- Family: Carole Shorenstein Hays (sister); Joan Shorenstein (sister)

Douglas W. Shorenstein (February 10, 1955 – November 24, 2015) was a San Francisco-based real estate developer and former chairman of the board of directors of the Federal Reserve Bank of San Francisco.

== Early life and education ==
Shorenstein was one of three children born, in San Francisco, California, on February 10, 1955, to real estate developer Walter Shorenstein and Phyllis Finley. His father was born Jewish and his mother underwent conversion to Judaism. He had two sisters: Broadway producer Carole Shorenstein Hays and CBS news producer and The Washington Post journalist Joan Shorenstein (who died of cancer in 1985). He graduated with a B.A. from the University of California, Berkeley and with a J.D. from the University of California, Hastings College of the Law.

== Career ==
In 1980, he moved to New York City where he worked for three years in the real estate department of the law firm Shearman & Sterling LLP. In 1983, he moved back to San Francisco and joined his father's real estate development company, Shorenstein Properties. In 1995, he was appointed chairman and CEO. Under his tutelage, he transitioned the company from a traditional local based real estate developer to a national real estate investment company with more than 70 properties in 13 cities including Los Angeles, Portland, Oregon and Manhattan. By 2006, Shorenstein Properties was the 20th largest owner of office buildings in the United States.

In 1991, Shorenstein Properties started its first closed-end fund tasked with making real estate investments nationally and requiring a minimum $25 million investment and a 20-year commitment. The fund had six partners, one of which was Shorenstein, and totaled $150 million. After the death of his father, he bought out his sister's interest and shifted the company to a pure fund platform with each fund typically being composed of 10-15% of his own money.

Shorenstein Properties, via twelve closed-end real estate funds, owns and manages 23 million square feet of office properties throughout the United States.

In 2007, he was appointed to the board of the Federal Reserve Bank of San Francisco; in 2010, he was elevated to deputy chairman; and in 2011, he was appointed chairman.

== Philanthropy and board memberships ==
Shorenstein served on the board the Environmental Defense Fund; the executive council of the University of California, San Francisco Medical Center; the executive committee of The Real Estate Roundtable; and Joan Shorenstein Center on the Press, Politics and Public Policy at Harvard University's Kennedy School of Government (named in honor of his late sister). In 2011, Shorenstein was inducted into the Bay Area Council's Bay Area Business Hall of Fame which "recognizes the extraordinary achievements of individuals who have advanced San Francisco Bay Area-based businesses to positions of national and international prominence." In 2013, he founded the Walter Shorenstein Media and Democracy Fellow at the Kennedy School's Shorenstein Center at Harvard University in honor of his father.

== Personal life ==
Shorenstein was married to Lydia Preisler; they had 3 children: a son, Brandon, and two daughters, Sandra and Danielle. He was a practitioner of yoga and was a collector of Southeast Asian and Nepalese art with an emphasis on Khmer and Cambodian pieces. He and his wife were members of the Congregation Emanu-El (San Francisco). Shorenstein died due to cancer on November 24, 2015.
