= Carole Shorenstein Hays =

American theatrical producer (born 1948)

- Born: Carole J. Shorenstein; September 15, 1948 (age 77)
- Occupation: theatrical producer
- Known for: owner of The Curran Theatre
- Spouse: Jeff Hays
- Children: 2
- Parent(s): Phyllis Finley Shorenstein; Walter Shorenstein
- Family: Joan Shorenstein (sister); Douglas W. Shorenstein (brother)

Carole Shorenstein Hays (born September 15, 1948 as Carole J. Shorenstein) is a Tony Award-winning American theatrical producer.

== Early life and family ==
Shorenstein Hays was one of three children born to real estate developer Walter Shorenstein and Phyllis Finley. Her father was born Jewish and her mother converted to Judaism. She had two siblings: CBS producer Joan Shorenstein (who died of cancer in 1985) and real estate investor Douglas W. Shorenstein (who died of cancer in 2015), the former chairman of the board of directors of the Federal Reserve Bank of San Francisco (his term ran from 2011 to 2014). She lives in Sea Cliff, San Francisco, California with her husband Jeff Hays. They have two children, Wally and Gracie. She was appointed to the National Park Foundation Board of Directors in 2009.

Shorenstein attended New York University but did not graduate. She worked at United Artists as a movie publicist for the film Live and Let Die.

== Theater Career ==
In the late 1980s, Shorenstein Hays joined her father's long time friend, James M. Nederlander as a business partner and established herself as a respected producer of critically acclaimed and financially successful works. She owned the Curran Theatre from 2012 unitl 2025 when it was sold to the San Francisco Giants. She continues to serve as President of SHN, a theatrical production company in San Francisco that operates from the Curran Theater.[6] Several of the plays she produced have received Tony Awards, including a revival of Fences in 2010 .

She has produced many award-winning Broadway plays. In addition to her Broadway endeavors, she was the President of SHN (Theatres), a theatrical producing company in San Francisco. She gave up her stake in SHN in 2019 and the company changed its name to BroadwaySF. She is the only Broadway producer to win the Tony Awards as producer for two different productions of the same play—August Wilson's Pulitzer Prize–winning Fences, winning Best Play for the original production in 1987 starring James Earl Jones, and Best Revival for the 2010 run starring Denzel Washington. She served as lead producer of the Broadway production of John Patrick Shanley's Doubt, which won the 2005 Tony Award for Best Play and The Pulitzer Prize. Carole also co-produced the Broadway production of Julius Caesar starring Denzel Washington. She has produced these additional Tony Award-winning plays on Broadway: Richard Greenberg's Take Me Out, Edward Albee's The Goat, or Who Is Sylvia, and Pulitzer Prize winner Proof by David Auburn. Other Broadway productions include Tony Kushner's Caroline, or Change, Suzan-Lori Parks's 2002 Pulitzer Prize-winning Topdog/Underdog, Charles Busch's The Tale of the Allergist's Wife, Patrick Marber's Closer, David Mamet's The Old Neighborhood, the Royal Court/Théâtre de Complicité production of Eugène Ionesco's The Chairs, and the RSC production of A Midsummer Night's Dream.

== Productions ==
Play	Location	Premiere	Finale
The Grand Tour	Palace Theatre	January 11, 1979	March 4, 1979
Woman of the Year	Palace Theatre	March 29, 1981	March 13, 1983
Can-Can	Minskoff Theatre	April 30, 1981	May 3, 1981
Oliver!	Mark Hellinger Theatre	April 29, 1984	May 13, 1984
Fences	46th Street Theatre	March 26, 1987	June 26, 1988
A Midsummer Night's Dream	Lunt-Fontanne Theatre	March 31, 1996	May 26, 1996
The Old Neighborhood	Booth Theatre	November 19, 1997	May 10, 1998
The Chairs	John Golden Theatre	April 1, 1998	June 13, 1998
Not About Nightingales	Circle in the Square Theatre	February 25, 1999	June 13, 1999
Closer	Music Box Theatre	March 25, 1999	August 22, 1999
Proof	Walter Kerr Theatre	October 24, 2000	January 5, 2003
The Tale of the Allergist's Wife	Ethel Barrymore Theatre	November 2, 2000	September 15, 2002
The Goat, or Who Is Sylvia?	John Golden Theatre	March 10, 2002	December 15, 2002
Topdog/Underdog	Ambassador Theatre	April 7, 2002	August 11, 2002
Take Me Out	Walter Kerr Theatre	February 27, 2003	January 4, 2004
Caroline, or Change	Eugene O'Neill Theatre	May 2, 2004	August 29, 2004
Gem of the Ocean	Walter Kerr Theatre	December 6, 2004	February 6, 2005
Doubt	Walter Kerr Theatre	March 31, 2005	July 2, 2006
Julius Caesar	Belasco Theatre	April 3, 2005	June 12, 2005
Well	Longacre Theatre	March 30, 2006	May 14, 2006
