= Hyman Schorenstein =

American politician (died 1953)

Hyman Schorenstein (unknown – February 3, 1953) was a Brooklyn Democratic leader who dominated Brooklyn politics for three decades beginning in the late 1910s. He influenced Meade Esposito, a Democratic party fixer.

Schorenstein immigrated from Austria in the late 1800s. He took control of politics in Brownsville, Brooklyn and was voted into office representing the Democratic Party. He led the effort to oppose socialists who were against United States involvement in World War I. Schorenstein became the first Jewish Democratic District leader. He was able to impress the Irish political machine and was appointed an election district captain at the age of 20. He offered local residents favors for their votes. One story alleged he gave 10 boots to a family of fisherman, all for their right feet, promising the matching boots would arrive after the election.

In 1928, Schorenstein was credited with stopping an eleventh-hour revolt in the Ohio delegation. He guaranteed Governor Al Smith of New York the nomination for president.

Schorenstein's illiteracy was well known. Schorenstein political rival’s challenge him to his literacy in 1933 when Schorenstein was Brooklyn's commissioner of records. The rival asked "can you read or write English?" to which Schorenstein replied "that’s my own personal business". Milton S. Gould, Schorenstein's friend who was a lawyer said, "there was one tragic flaw in the effulgent personality of this municipal monarch: He was illiterate."

After dominating local politics for three decades, Schorenstein was voted out of office largely due to the Italian mafia sending hundreds of associates to illegally vote against him in his district.

His nephew Walter Herbert Shorenstein was a real estate investor and a top Democratic donor who, at one point, became the largest landlord in San Francisco.
