= Michael Barone (pundit) =

American journalist

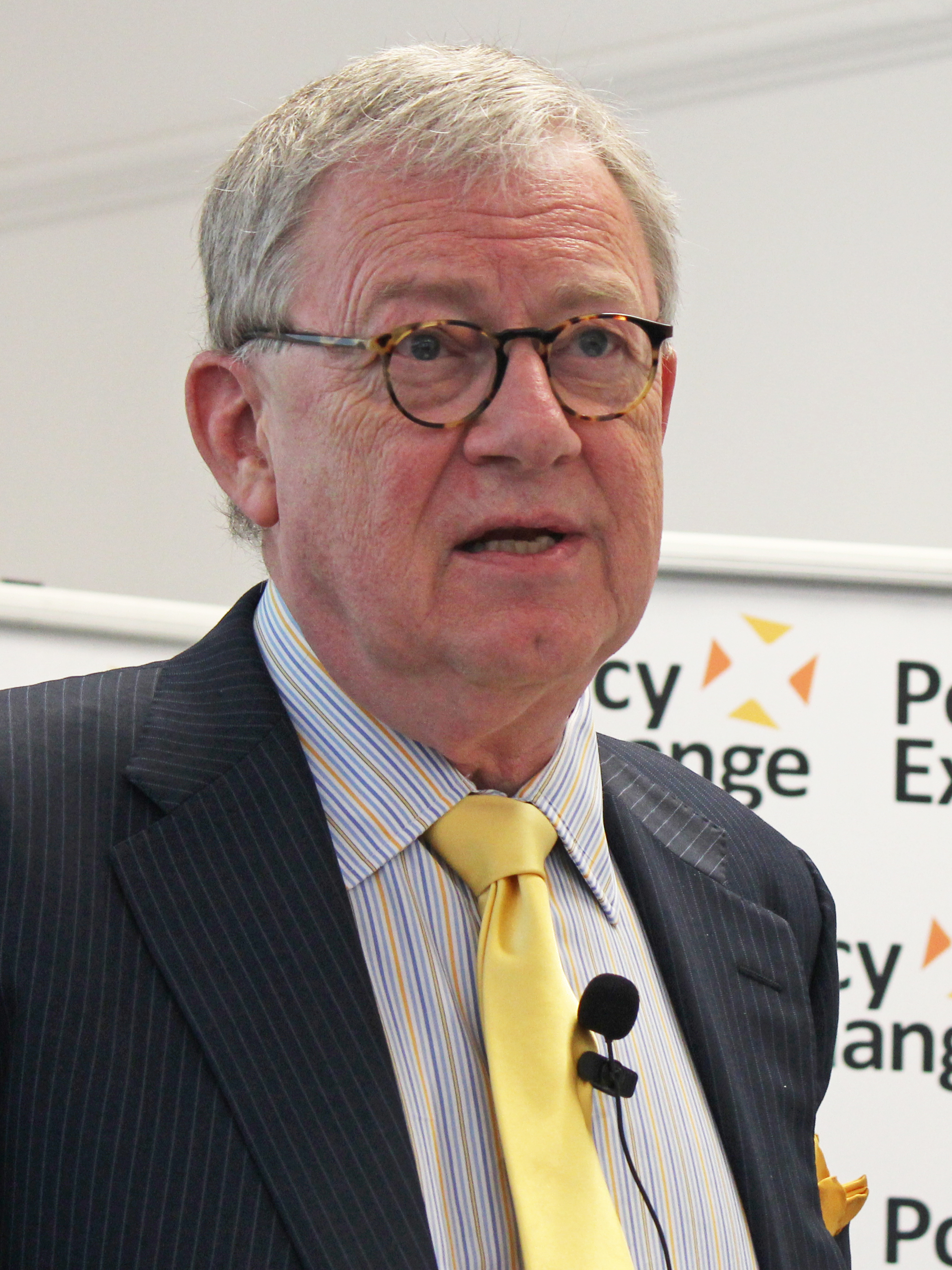
- Barone in 2014
- Born: September 19, 1944 (age 82); Highland Park, Michigan, U.S.
- Education: Harvard University (BA); Yale University (LLB)
- Occupations: Social historian, lawyer, opinion writer
- Employer(s): Washington Examiner, American Enterprise Institute, Fox News
- Notable work: The Almanac of American Politics
- Television: Fox News Channel; The McLaughlin Group
- Spouse: Joan Shorenstein (m. 1975; died 1985)
- Children: 1

Michael D. Barone (born September 19, 1944) is an American conservative political analyst, historian, pundit and journalist. He is best known as the principal author of The Almanac of American Politics.

Barone is also a regular commentator on United States elections and political trends for the Fox News Channel. In April 2009, Barone joined the Washington Examiner, leaving his position of 18 years at U.S. News & World Report. He is based at the American Enterprise Institute as a resident fellow. He has written several books on American political and demographic history.

== Background ==
Barone was born in Highland Park, Michigan, the son of Alice Katherine (née Darcy) and Charles Gerald "Jerry" Barone, a surgeon. His father was of Italian descent and his mother of Irish descent. He was raised in Detroit and Birmingham, Michigan.

Barone graduated from Cranbrook School in Bloomfield Hills in 1962. He received a bachelor's degree from Harvard College in 1966 and a law degree from Yale Law School in 1969, where he was an editor of the Yale Law Journal. After law school he clerked for Judge Wade H. McCree of the United States Court of Appeals for the Sixth Circuit. Although he has been conservative as an adult, in the 1960s he worked as an intern for Jerome Cavanagh, the Democratic mayor of Detroit. He was also a supporter of George McGovern in 1972.

In 1975, Barone married Joan Shorenstein. She died at age 38 in 1985 after a 10-year battle with cancer.

== Political analyst ==
Barone is a senior political analyst for the Washington Examiner, where he writes a twice weekly column and contributes to the newspaper's blog. His column is syndicated by Creators Syndicate. He is also a frequent contributor during Fox News Channel's election coverage. His political views are predominantly conservative. Barone has said he is not religious, although he is sympathetic to and respectful of social conservatives.

His commentary has largely focused on the topic of immigration.

- Columnist, Townhall.com, 2001–present
- Senior political analyst, Washington Examiner, 2009–present
- Senior writer, U.S. News & World Report, Washington, 1989–1996, 1998–departure
- Senior staff editor, Reader's Digest, Washington, 1996–1998
- editorial writer and columnist, The Washington Post, 1981–1988
- Vice president, Peter D. Hart Research Co., Washington, 1974–81
- Law clerk to Judge Wade H. McCree, Jr., U.S. 6th Circuit Court of Appeals, Detroit, 1969–71

In November 2008, Barone said journalists criticized Republican vice presidential nominee Sarah Palin because "she did not abort her Down syndrome baby." Barone later said he was "attempting to be humorous and ... went over the line."

Barone covered the 2020 presidential election, writing numerous opinion columns on the race for the Examiner. Barone argued in 2020 that national presidential nominating conventions are no longer needed or useful. He welcomes their replacement by virtual conventions with minimal participation. They were useful before the advent of television in 1952, he says:

National conventions no longer serve their original purpose, or the uses the parties and the press have made of them in the past half-century. The national conventions were, for their first 130 years, a unique communications medium. They were the only place and time where party politicians could communicate frankly and bargain personally. They were the only place where people could discover which candidates had genuine support and which just gave lip service.

== Writings ==
External videos
- Booknotes interview with Barone on Our Country, April 22, 1990, C-SPAN
- Presentation by Barone on The New Americans, June 27, 2001, C-SPAN
- Presentation by Barone on Shaping Our Nation, October 17, 2013, C-SPAN
- Washington Journal interview with Barone on Shaping Our Nation, November 24, 2013, C-SPAN
- Washington Journal interview with Barone on How America's Political Parties Change (and How They Don't), October 20, 2019, C-SPAN
- Panel discussion on How America's Political Parties Change (and How They Don't), October 23, 2019, C-SPAN

He is the author of several books:

- Our Country: The Shaping of America from Roosevelt to Reagan (Free Press, 1990)
- The New Americans: How the Melting Pot can work Again (Regnery Publishing, 2001)
- Hard America, Soft America: Competition vs. Coddling and the Battle for the Nation's Future (Crown Forum, 2004)
- Our First Revolution: The Remarkable British Upheaval that Inspired America's Founding Fathers (Crown Publishers, 2007), a popular history of the Glorious Revolution of 1688 and how it led to the American Revolution.
- principal co-author, The Almanac of American Politics, (published biennially 1972–)
- The New Americans: How the Melting Pot Can Work Again (Regnery Publishing, 2012)
- Shaping Our Nation: How Surges of Migration Transformed America and Its Politics (Growth Forum, 2013)
- How America’s Political Parties Change (and How They Don’t) (Encounter Books, 2019)
