= Orpheum Theatre (San Francisco) =

Theatre in San Francisco, California, U.S.

- Pantages Theatre; New Orpheum Theatre
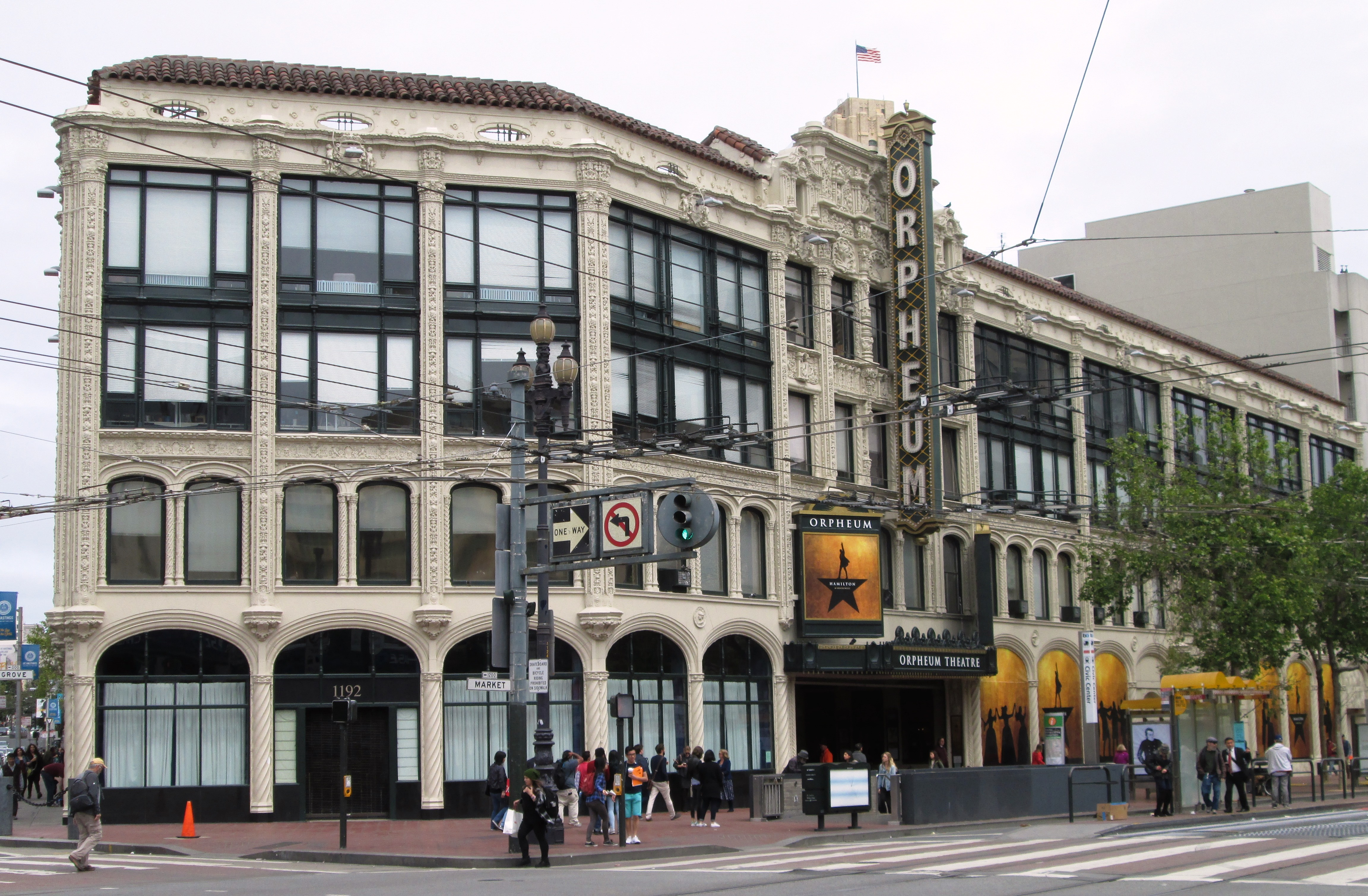

- Location within San Francisco County
- Address: 1192 Market Street; San Francisco, California
- Coordinates: 37.779081°N 122.414708°W
- Owner: ATG Entertainment
- Operator: ATG Entertainment
- Capacity: 2,197
- Designation: San Francisco Landmark
- Public transit: Civic Center/UN Plaza

Construction
- Opened: 1926
- Architect: B. Marcus Priteca

San Francisco Designated Landmark
- Designated: 1977
- Reference no.: 94

The Orpheum Theatre, originally the Pantages Theatre, is located at 1192 Market Street at Hyde, Grove and 8th Streets in the Civic Center district of San Francisco, California. The theatre first opened in 1926 as one of the many designed by architect B. Marcus Priteca for theater-circuit owner Alexander Pantages. The interior features a vaulted ceiling, while the facade is a Plateresque (Late Spanish Gothic) Revival. The Orpheum seats 2,197 patrons. In 1998, after a previous renovation in the 1970s, a $20 million renovation was completed to make the Orpheum more suitable for Broadway shows. The theatre is a locally designated San Francisco landmark as determined by the San Francisco Landmarks Preservation Advisory Board.

The Orpheum, as well as the Golden Gate Theatre in San Francisco, are owned by BroadwaySF.

== History ==
In April 1998 the Kern/Hammerstein musical "Show Boat" was the first production staged in the reconstructed and expanded theater.

The theater has hosted numerous Broadway shows, including a two-year sit-down production of the musical Wicked from January 27, 2009, through September 2010.

The Grateful Dead gave six performances here on July 12–18, 1976, with the Saturday show (the 17th) released on Dave's Picks Volume 18 along with part of the night before's show. The Jerry Garcia Band also played the Orpheum on a further eight occasions.

From April 30 to May 4, 2007, the theatre hosted Late Night with Conan O'Brien.

Productions that were staged at the Orpheum prior to opening on Broadway have included Bring It On: The Musical (2011–2012), Evita (1979), Mamma Mia! (2000–2001), and The Act (1977).

== Gallery ==
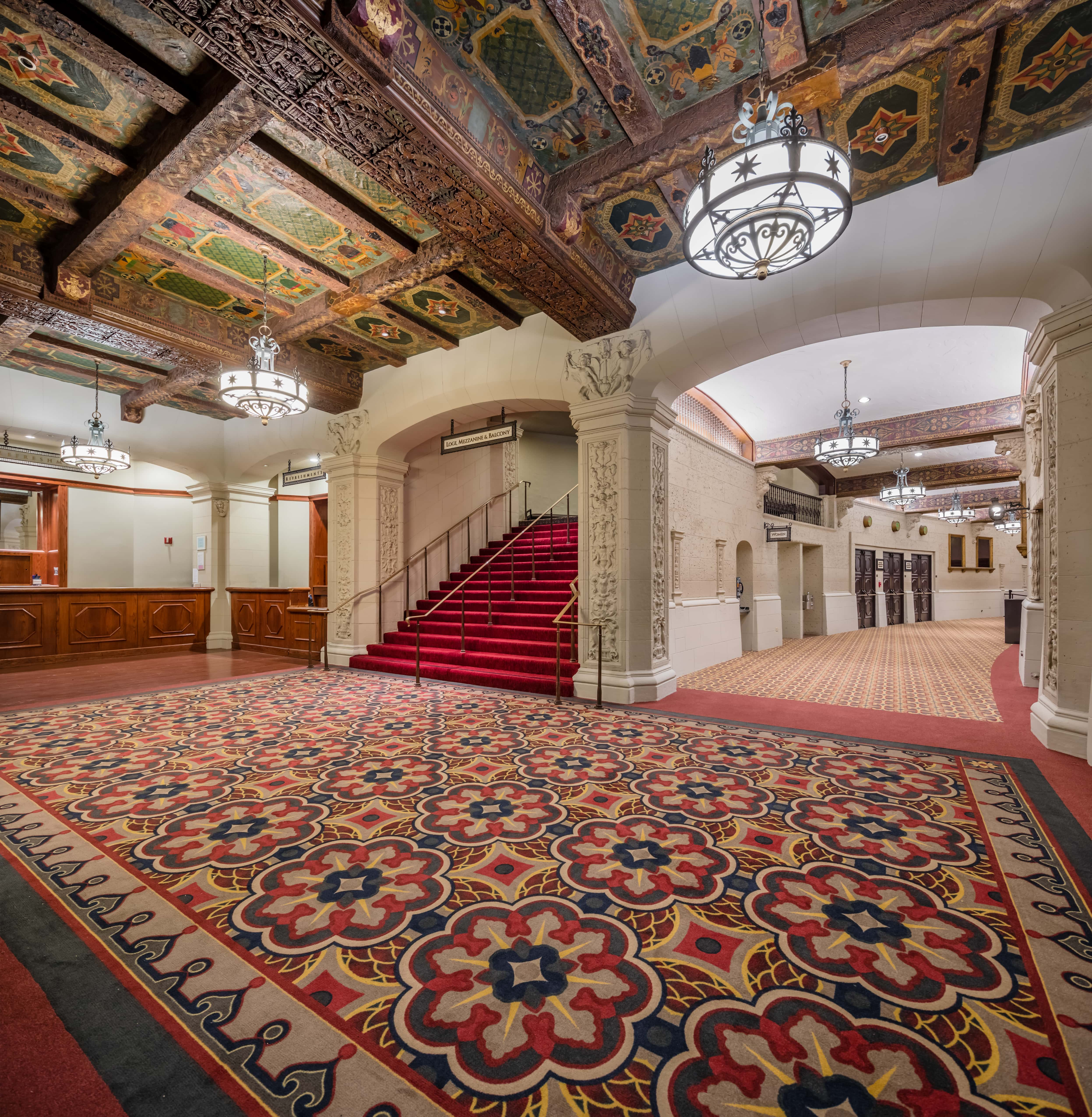
The lobby of the Orpheum

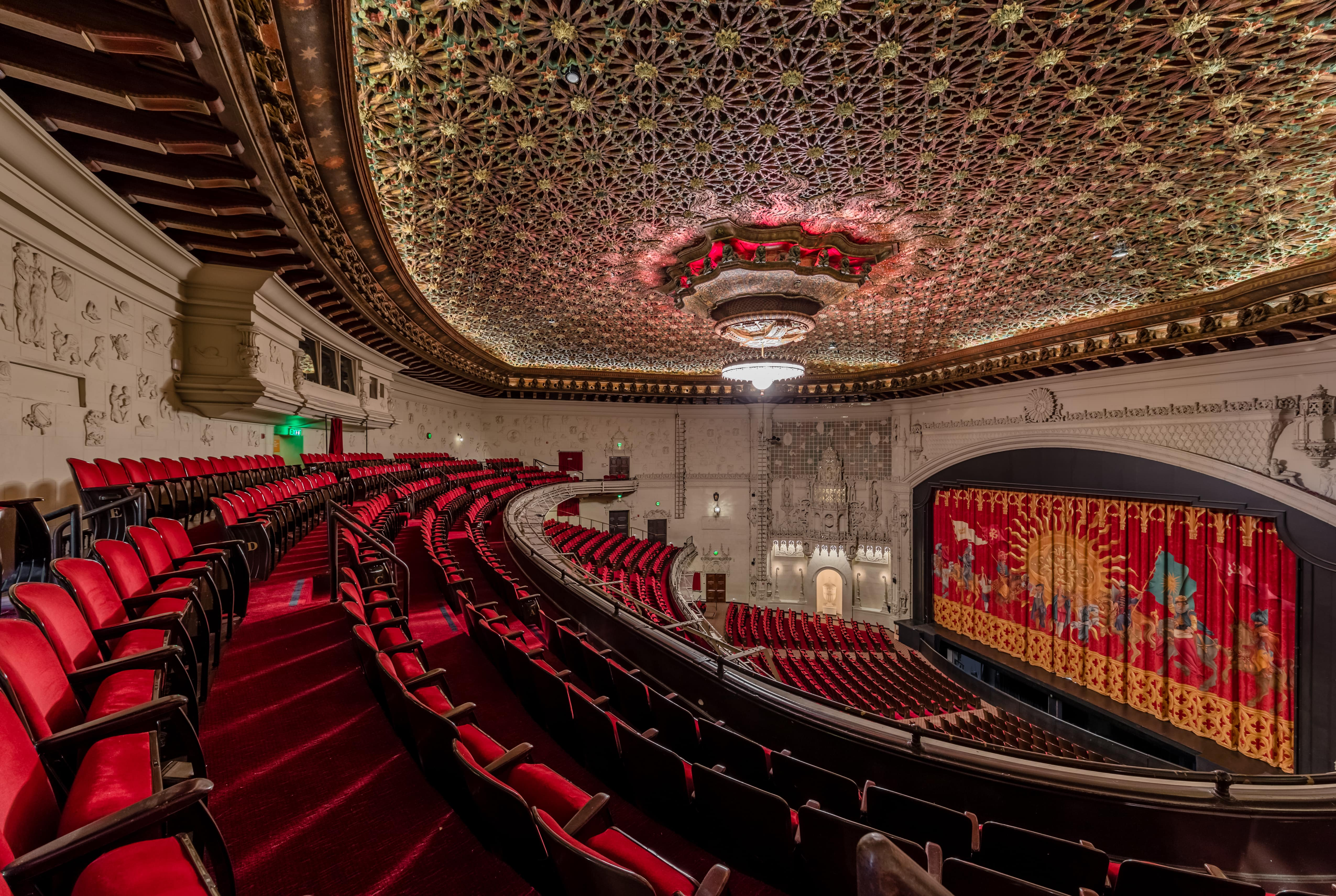
The theater's auditorium

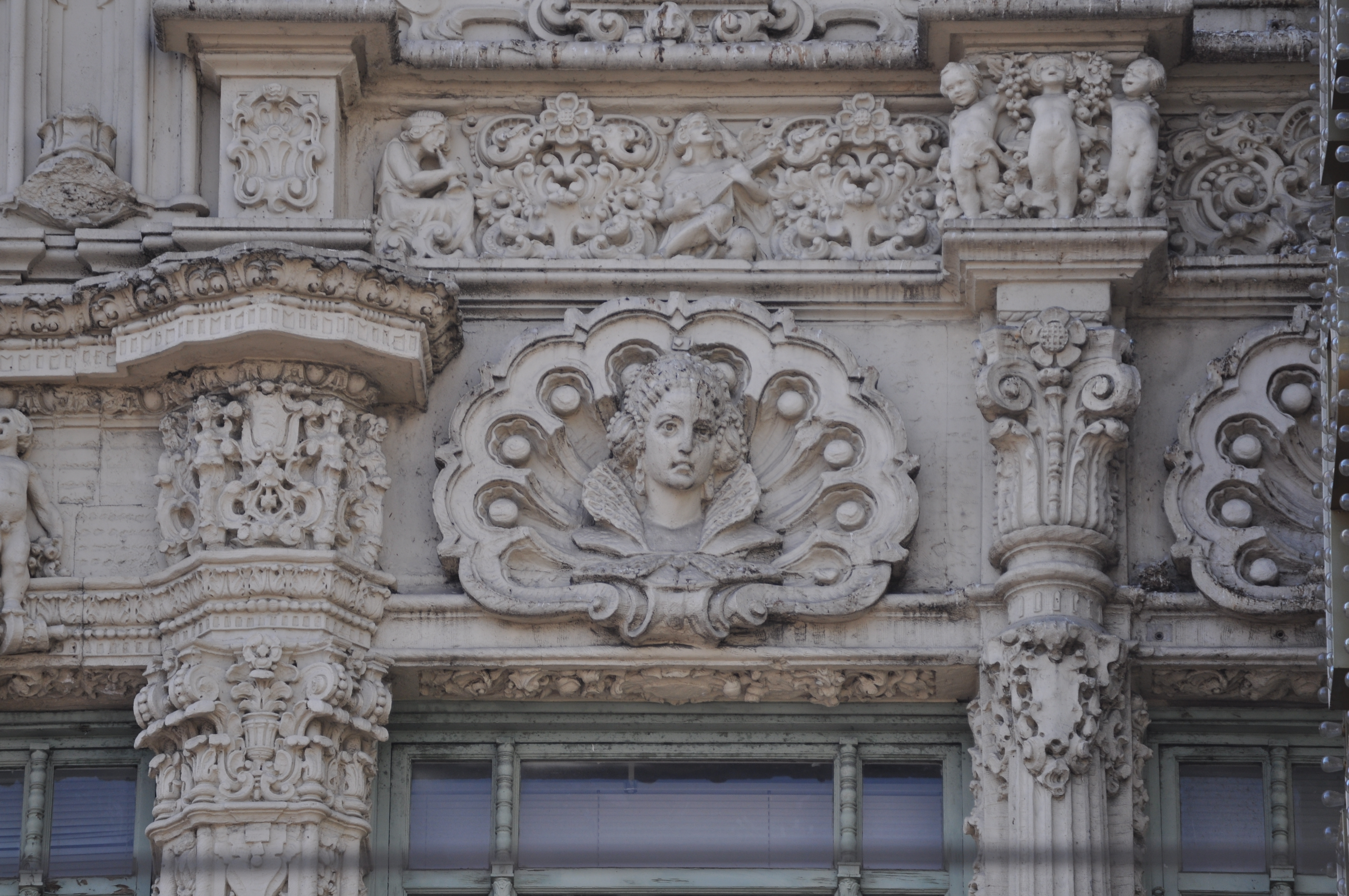
Detail of the building's facade
