= Golden Gate Theatre =

Performance venue in San Francisco, California, United States

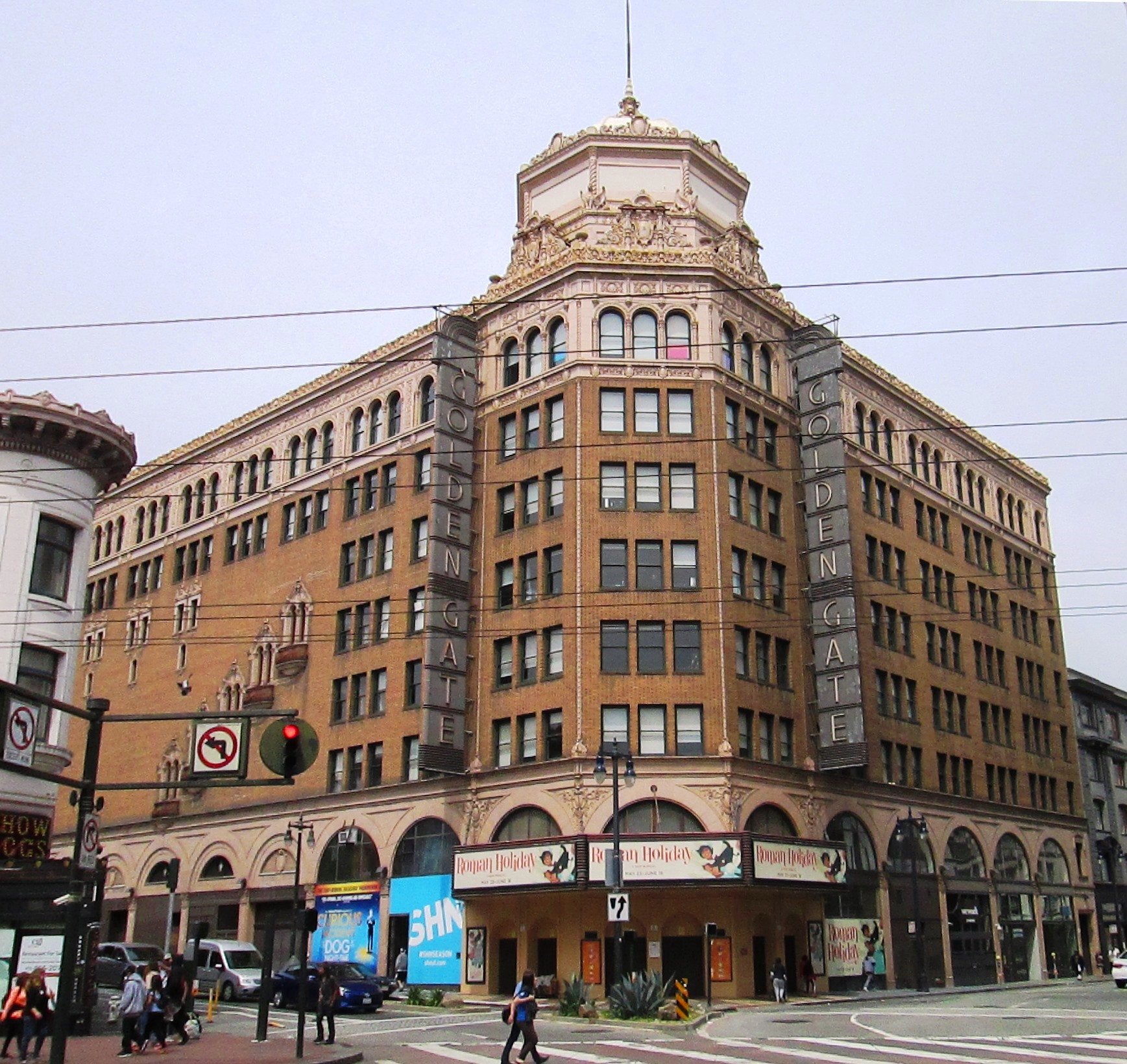
- (2017)
- Interactive map of Golden Gate Theatre
- Address: 1 Taylor Street; San Francisco, California; 94102
- Coordinates: 37.78216°N 122.41073°W
- Owner: ATG Entertainment
- Operator: ATG Entertainment
- Capacity: 2,297

Construction
- Opened: March 26, 1922
- Closed: 1972
- Reopened: 1979

The Golden Gate Theatre is a performance venue located at 1 Taylor Street at the corner of Golden Gate Avenue in San Francisco, California, United States. It opened in 1922 as a vaudeville house and later was a major movie theater. In the 1960s it boasted a Cinerama screen, but by the early 1970s it had declined and was showing blaxploitation films. It was restored and reopened as a performing arts venue in 1979.

The theatre is part of the Market Street Theatre and Loft District which is listed on the National Register of Historic Places.

== History ==
The 2,300-seat Golden Gate Theatre was built in 1920-21 and was designed by G. Albert Lansburgh for the Radio-Keith-Orpheum (RKO) theater circuit; Lansburgh also designed the nearby Warfield Theatre at about the same time. It opened in March with seven vaudeville acts appearing in one night's performance. A reviewer for the San Francisco Chronicle said of the new theater:

[The auditorium] suggests the outdoors, with none of the roofed-over feel that characterizes the average theatre. ... It is like sitting under a bit of blue sky, so effective is the color suggestion.

In the following decades, the theatre presented such performers as The Andrews Sisters, Louis Armstrong, Judy Garland, Nat King Cole, Roy Rogers, The Three Stooges, Ethel Waters, the Marx Brothers, and Frank Sinatra, before RKO converted it in 1954 to present films, leasing it to the Cinerama Corporation.

In the transition to showing movies, some of the interior architectural work was destroyed, with an escalator replacing the central marble staircase, and neon signs being installed. In the 1960s the theatre was "twinned, divided into two theatres, with the balcony theatre being christened the "Penthouse Theatre." Even with this, business declined, and in 1972 RKO closed down both theatres down.

The Golden Gate and the San Francisco Orpheum are owned by BroadwaySF; the company bought the Golden Gate in 1979 and mounted a total renovation for use as a theatre for plays and musicals. The first performance the new owners presented was A Chorus Line, which was the first performance on the Golden Gate's stage in 25 years.

BroadwaySF has presented many Broadway shows at the Golden Gate, such as Sweeney Todd, Stomp, Hairspray, Mamma Mia!, Chicago, and Rent. The theater also had the preview engagement of Legally Blonde: The Musical before it went to Broadway, as well as the pre-Broadway engagements of revival productions of Cabaret (1987), Joseph and the Amazing Technicolor Dreamcoat (1993), and My Fair Lady (1981).

The Theatre staged a national touring company production of Fiddler on the Roof starring Theodore Bikel as Tevye in 2001. The U.S. national tour of South Pacific, based on the 2008 Tony Award winning revival, played The Golden Gate Theatre in September 2009 before embarking on tour across the United States. A national tour of Fiddler on the Roof starring Harvey Fierstein played at the Golden Gate from January–February 21, 2010. In October 2014, the touring production of Pippin spent a number of weeks at the Golden Gate. This production starred television icon Lucie Arnaz. During the run at the Golden Gate, she left the touring company for a few months so she could appear in the Broadway production. She was temporarily replaced by Tony Award-winning actress Andrea Martin, who originated the role of Berthe in the 2013 Broadway revival. The first national tour of Hedwig and the Angry Inch began a run at the Golden Gate on October 4, 2016.

On June 27, 2013 WeWork officially opened their second San Francisco location in the six floors above the theater. The new WeWork Golden Gate location will provide collaborative workspace for approximately 200 small businesses and startups.
