= Congressional-Executive Commission on China =

United States agency monitoring human rights in China

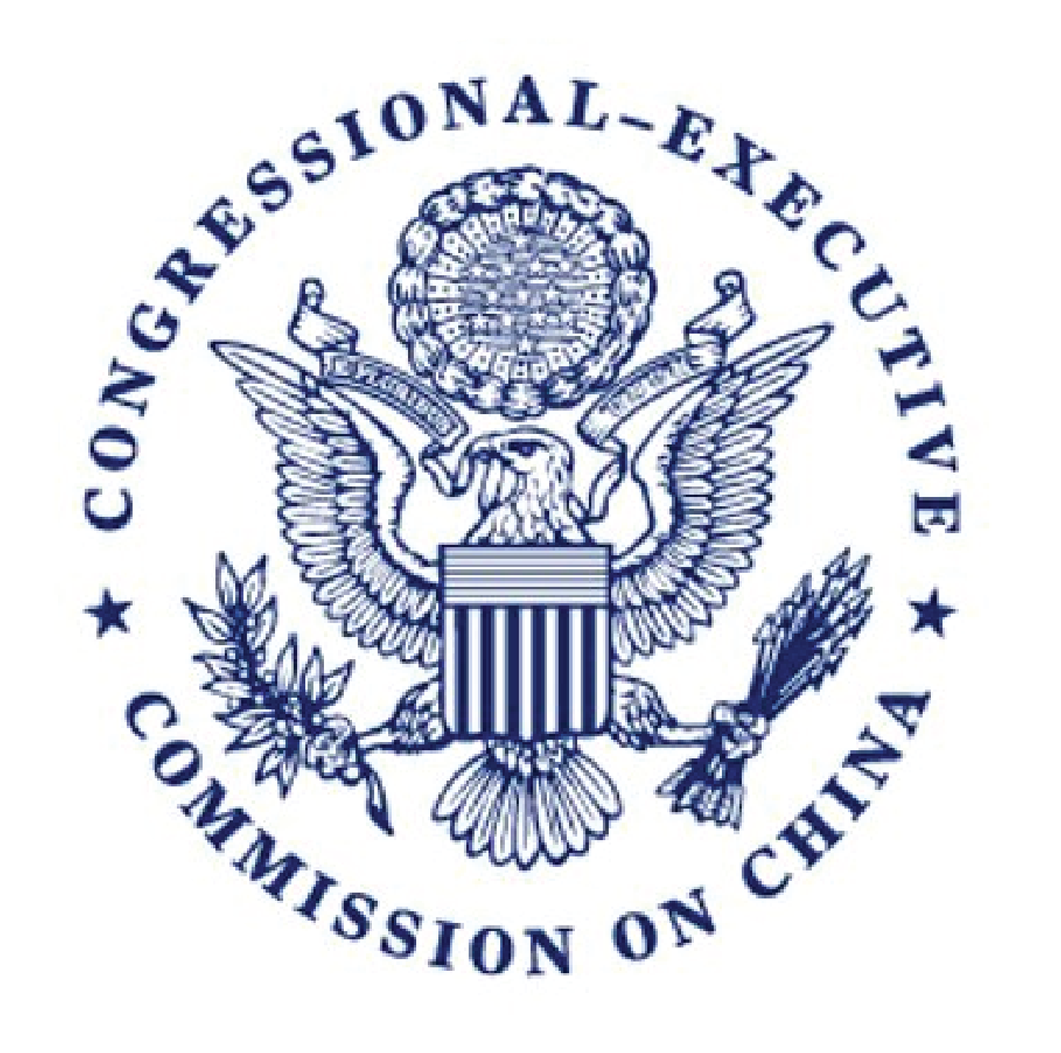
- Seal of the USCC

Agency overview
- Formed: December 2000
- Headquarters: Ford House Office Building, Washington, D.C.
- Agency executives: Dan Sullivan, Chair; Chris Smith, Co-chair; Scott Flipse, Staff Director
- Parent department: United States Congress
- Key document: https://www.cecc.gov/about/legislative-mandate
- Website: https://www.cecc.gov/

The Congressional-Executive Commission on China (CECC) is an independent agency of the U.S. government which monitors human rights and rule of law developments in the People's Republic of China. The commission was given the mandate by the U.S. Congress to monitor and report on human rights issues with a particular focus on compliance with the International Covenant on Civil and Political Rights and the Universal Declaration of Human Rights. Its reporting covers developments in freedom of expression, the right to peaceful assembly, religious freedom, freedom of movement, freedom from arbitrary arrest and detention or torture, and the right to a fair trial, among others. The commission publishes an annual report to the President of the United States and Congress, typically in the fall of each year. It also maintains a database of prisoners of conscience, holds regular roundtables and hearings, and issues letters to other institutions concerning human rights matters.

== Creation ==
The creation of the Congressional-Executive Commission on China (along with the United States-China Economic and Security Review Committee) emerged as part of negotiations for permanent normal trade relations with China upon its accession to the World Trade Organization.

The commission was created in October 2000 under Title III of H.R. 4444, which authorizes normal trade relations with China and establishes a framework for relations between the two countries.

== Work ==
=== Annual report ===
The CECC publishes an annual report on human rights and rule of law developments in China, usually in the fall of each year, and covers issues such as freedom of expression, worker rights, religious freedom, ethnic minority rights, population planning, the status of women, climate change and the environment, treatment of North Korean refugees, civil society, access to justice, and democratic governance. The reports draw on a variety of sources, including information from human rights groups, media reports, government, and Chinese Communist Party documents.

=== Prisoner database ===
As part of its mandate from Congress, the CECC maintains a partial database of religious and political prisoners believed to be detained in China. As of December 12, 2026, the database contained 11,262 names, of which 2,755 were believed to be detained at that time, while the remainder were released, deceased, or escaped.

The database was created with the assistance of the Dui Hua Foundation and Tibet Information Network.

== Staff ==
The commission consists of a staff of researchers and analysts and is overseen by as many as nine members each from the U.S. Senate and House of Representatives, as well as one representative each from State, Commerce, and Labor, and two other executive branch employees nominated by the President. The chair of the commission rotates between the majority parties from the House and Senate. The commission is currently chaired by Rep. Chris Smith (R-NJ).

On December 23, 2022, Chinese Foreign Minister Wang Yi announced that Todd Stein, CECC deputy staff director, would be one of two individuals sanctioned by China with effect from the same day. The order specified that this was in retaliation to the United States having sanctioned two Chinese officials earlier that month over human rights issues in Tibet. In an emailed comment to The Associated Press, Stein said the sanction order against him did not matter in light of the "thousands of prisoners of conscience jailed by Chinese authorities."

== Commissioners ==
	Majority	Minority
Senate members	Dan Sullivan, Alaska, Chair; Tom Cotton, Arkansas	Jeff Merkley, Oregon, Vice Ranking Member; Tammy Duckworth, Illinois; Andy Kim, New Jersey; Lisa Blunt Rochester, Delaware
House members	Chris Smith, New Jersey, Co-Chair; Elise Stefanik, New York; Zach Nunn, Iowa; Jen Kiggans, Virginia; Dale Strong, Alabama	Jim McGovern, Massachusetts, Ranking Member; Tom Suozzi, New York; Suhas Subramanyam, Virginia; James Walkinshaw, Virginia
Executive branch	1 vacant, Department of Commerce; 1 vacant, Department of Labor; 3 vacant, Department of State	

Historical membership

Commissioners, 118th Congress

	Majority	Minority
Senate members	Jeff Merkley, Oregon, Co-Chair; Angus King, Maine; Tammy Duckworth, Illinois	Marco Rubio, Florida, Ranking Member; Tom Cotton, Arkansas; Steve Daines, Montana; Dan Sullivan, Alaska
House members	Chris Smith, New Jersey, Chair; Brian Mast, Florida; Michelle Steel, California; Ryan Zinke, Montana; Zach Nunn, Iowa	Jim McGovern, Massachusetts, Vice Ranking Member; Jennifer Wexton, Virginia; Susan Wild, Pennsylvania; Andrea Salinas, Oregon
Executive branch	Uzra Zeya, Department of State; Marisa Lago, Department of Commerce; Thea Lee, Department of Labor; Daniel Kritenbrink, Department of State; Erin Barclay, Department of State	

Commissioners, 117th Congress

	Majority	Minority
Senate members	Jeff Merkley, Oregon, Chair; Dianne Feinstein, California; Angus King, Maine; Jon Ossoff, Georgia	Marco Rubio, Florida, Vice Ranking Member; James Lankford, Oklahoma; Tom Cotton, Arkansas; Steve Daines, Montana
House members	Jim McGovern, Massachusetts, Co-Chair; Tom Suozzi, New York; Tom Malinowski, New Jersey; Rashida Tlaib, Michigan; Jennifer Wexton, Virginia	Chris Smith, New Jersey, Ranking Member; Brian Mast, Florida; Vicky Hartzler, Missouri; Michelle Steel, California
Executive branch	Uzra Zeya, Department of State; Marisa Lago, Department of Commerce; Thea Lee, Department of Labor; Daniel Kritenbrink, Department of State; Lisa Peterson, Department of State	

Commissioners, 116th Congress

	Majority	Minority
Senate members	Marco Rubio, Florida, Co-Chair; James Lankford, Oklahoma; Tom Cotton, Arkansas; Steve Daines, South Dakota; Todd Young, Indiana	Dianne Feinstein, California, Ranking Member; Jeff Merkley, Oregon; Gary Peters, Michigan; Angus King, Maine
House members	Jim McGovern, Massachusetts, Chair; Marcy Kaptur, Ohio; Tom Suozzi, New York; Tom Malinowski, New Jersey; Ben McAdams, Utah	Chris Smith, New Jersey, Vice Ranking Member; Brian Mast, Florida; Vicky Hartzler, Missouri; 1 vacant
Executive Branch	1 vacant, Department of Commerce; 1 vacant, Department of Labor; 3 vacant, Department of State	

Commissioners, 115th Congress

	Majority	Minority
Senate members	Marco Rubio, Florida, Chair; James Lankford, Oklahoma; Tom Cotton, Arkansas; Steve Daines, South Dakota; Todd Young, Indiana	Dianne Feinstein, California, Vice Ranking Member; Jeff Merkley, Oregon; Gary Peters, Michigan; Angus King, Maine
House members	Chris Smith, New Jersey, Co-Chair; Robert Pittenger, North Carolina; Randy Hultgren, Illinois; 2 vacant	Marcy Kaptur, Ohio, Ranking Member; Tim Walz, Minnesota; Ted Lieu, California; 1 vacant
Executive Branch	1 vacant, Department of Commerce; 1 vacant, Department of Labor; 3 vacant, Department of State	

Commissioners, 114th Congress

	Majority	Minority
Senate members	Marco Rubio, Florida, Co-Chair; James Lankford, Oklahoma; Tom Cotton, Arkansas; Steve Daines, South Dakota; Ben Sasse, Nebraska	Dianne Feinstein, California, Ranking Member; Jeff Merkley, Oregon; Gary Peters, Michigan; 1 vacant
House members	Chris Smith, New Jersey, Chair; Robert Pittenger, North Carolina; Trent Franks, Arizona; Randy Hultgren, Illinois; Diane Black, Tennessee	Tim Walz, Minnesota, Vice Ranking Member; Marcy Kaptur, Ohio; Mike Honda, California; Ted Lieu, California
Executive Branch	Chris Lu, Department of Labor; Sarah Sewall, Department of State; Stefan Selig, Department of Commerce; Daniel Russel, Department of State; Tom Malinowski, Department of State	

Commissioners, 113th Congress

	Majority	Minority
Senate members	Sherrod Brown, Ohio, Chair; Dianne Feinstein, California; Carl Levin, Michigan; Jeff Merkley, Oregon; Kay Hagan, North Carolina	Susan Collins, Maine, Vice Ranking Member; Jim Risch, Idaho; 2 vacant
House members	Chris Smith, New Jersey, Co-Chair; Frank Wolf, Virginia; Mark Meadows, North Carolina; Robert Pittenger, North Carolina; 1 vacant	Tim Walz, Minnesota, Ranking Member; Marcy Kaptur, Ohio; Mike Honda, California; 1 vacant
Executive Branch	Chris Lu, Department of Labor; Sarah Sewall, Department of State; Stefan Selig, Department of Commerce; Daniel Russel, Department of State; Tom Malinowski, Department of State	

Commissioners, 112th Congress

	Majority	Minority
Senate members	Sherrod Brown, Ohio, Co-Chair; Max Baucus, Montana; Dianne Feinstein, California; Carl Levin, Michigan; Jeff Merkley, Oregon	Susan Collins, Maine, Ranking Member; Jim Risch, Idaho; 2 vacant
House members	Chris Smith, New Jersey, Chair; Don Manzullo, Illinois; Ed Royce, California; Frank Wolf, Virginia; 1 vacant	Tim Walz, Minnesota, Vice Ranking Member; Marcy Kaptur, Ohio; Mike Honda, California; 1 vacant
Executive Branch	Kurt Campbell, Department of State; Seth Harris, Department of Labor; Maria Otero, Department of State; Francisco Sánchez, Department of Commerce; Nisha Biswal, Department of State	

Commissioners, 111th Congress

	Majority	Minority
Senate members	Byron Dorgan, North Dakota, Chair; Max Baucus, Montana; Dianne Feinstein, California; Carl Levin, Michigan; Sherrod Brown, Ohio	Sam Brownback, Kansas, Vice Ranking Member; John Barrasso, Wyoming; Bob Corker, Tennessee; George LeMieux, Florida
House members	Sandy Levin, Michigan, Co-Chair; Marcy Kaptur, Ohio; Mike Honda, California; Tim Walz, Minnesota; David Wu, Oregon	Chris Smith, New Jersey, Ranking Member; Joe Pitts, Pennsylvania; Don Manzullo, Illinois; Ed Royce, California
Executive Branch	Kurt Campbell, Department of State; Seth Harris, Department of Labor; Maria Otero, Department of State; Francisco Sánchez, Department of Commerce; 1 vacant, Department of State	

Commissioners, 110th Congress

	Majority	Minority
Senate members	Byron Dorgan, North Dakota, Co-Chair; Max Baucus, Montana; Dianne Feinstein, California; Carl Levin, Michigan; Sherrod Brown, Ohio	Chuck Hagel, Nebraska, Ranking Member; Sam Brownback, Kansas; Gordon Smith, Oregon; Mel Martínez, Florida
House members	Sandy Levin, Michigan, Chair; Marcy Kaptur, Ohio; Mike Honda, California; Tom Udall, New Mexico; Tim Walz, Minnesota	Chris Smith, New Jersey, Vice Ranking Member; Joe Pitts, Pennsylvania; Don Manzullo, Illinois; Ed Royce, California
Executive Branch	Paula Dobriansky, Department of State; Christopher Hill, Department of State; Howard Radzely, Department of Labor; David Kramer, Department of State; Christopher Padilla, Department of Commerce	

Commissioners, 109th Congress

	Majority	Minority
Senate members	Chuck Hagel, Nebraska, Chair; Sam Brownback, Kansas; Gordon Smith, Oregon; Jim DeMint, South Carolina; Mel Martínez, Florida	Max Baucus, Montana, Vice Ranking Member; Byron Dorgan, North Dakota; Dianne Feinstein, California; Carl Levin, Michigan
House members	Jim Leach, Iowa, Co-Chair; David Dreier, California; Joe Pitts, Pennsylvania; Don Manzullo, Illinois; Frank Wolf, Virginia; Bob Aderholt, Alabama	Marcy Kaptur, Ohio, Ranking Member; Sandy Levin, Michigan; Sherrod Brown, Ohio; Mike Honda, California
Executive Branch	Paula Dobriansky, Department of State; Steven Law, Department of Labor; Christopher Hill, Department of State; Frank Lavin, Department of Commerce; Barry Lowenkron, Department of State	

Commissioners, 108th Congress

	Majority	Minority
Senate members	Chuck Hagel, Nebraska, Co-Chair; Sam Brownback, Kansas; Pat Roberts, Kansas; Gordon Smith, Oregon; Craig Thomas, Wyoming	Max Baucus, Montana, Ranking Member; Byron Dorgan, North Dakota; Dianne Feinstein, California; Carl Levin, Michigan
House members	Jim Leach, Iowa, Chair; Doug Bereuter, Nebraska; David Dreier, California; Joe Pitts, Pennsylvania; Frank Wolf, Virginia; Bob Aderholt, Alabama	Marcy Kaptur, Ohio, Vice Ranking Member; Sandy Levin, Michigan; Sherrod Brown, Ohio; David Wu, Oregon
Executive Branch	Grant Aldonas, Department of Commerce; Lorne Craner, Department of State; Paula Dobriansky, Department of State; James Kelly, Department of State; Steven Law, Department of Labor	

Commissioners, 107th Congress

	Majority	Minority
Senate members	Max Baucus, Montana, Chair; Evan Bayh, Indiana; Byron Dorgan, North Dakota; Dianne Feinstein, California; Carl Levin, Michigan	Chuck Hagel, Nebraska, Vice Ranking Member; Sam Brownback, Kansas; Tim Hutchinson, Arkansas; Bob Smith, New Hampshire
House members	Doug Bereuter, Nebraska, Co-Chair; David Dreier, California; Jim Leach, Iowa; Joe Pitts, Pennsylvania; Frank Wolf, Virginia	Sandy Levin, Michigan, Ranking Member; Jim Davis, Florida; Marcy Kaptur, Ohio; Nancy Pelosi, California (until June 2002); Sherrod Brown, Ohio (from June 2002)
Executive Branch	Grant Aldonas, Department of Commerce; Lorne Craner, Department of State; Paula Dobriansky, Department of State; Cameron Findlay, Department of Labor; James Kelly, Department of State	

== Historical leadership ==
Start	End	Chair	Co-chair	Ranking Member	Vice Ranking Member
2001	2003	Sen. Max Baucus (D-MT)	Rep. Doug Bereuter (R-NE)	Rep. Sandy Levin (D-MI)	Sen. Chuck Hagel (R-NE)
2003	2005	Rep. Jim Leach (R-IA)	Sen. Chuck Hagel (R-NE)	Sen. Max Baucus (D-MT)	Rep. Marcy Kaptur (D-OH)
2005	2007	Sen. Chuck Hagel (R-NE)	Rep. Jim Leach (R-IA)	Rep. Marcy Kaptur (D-OH)	Sen. Max Baucus (D-MT)
2007	2009	Rep. Sandy Levin (D-MI)	Sen. Byron Dorgan (D-ND)	Sen. Chuck Hagel (R-NE)	Rep. Chris Smith (R-NJ)
2009	2011	Sen. Byron Dorgan (D-ND)	Rep. Sandy Levin (D-MI)	Rep. Chris Smith (R-NJ)	Sen. Chuck Hagel (R-NE)
2011	2013	Rep. Chris Smith (R-NJ)	Sen. Sherrod Brown (D-OH)	Sen. Susan Collins (R-ME)	Rep. Tim Walz (D-MN)
2013	2015	Sen. Sherrod Brown (D-OH)	Rep. Chris Smith (R-NJ)	Rep. Tim Walz (D-MN)	Sen. Susan Collins (R-ME)
2015	2017	Rep. Chris Smith (R-NJ)	Sen. Marco Rubio (R-FL)	Sen. Dianne Feinstein (D-CA)	Rep. Tim Walz (D-MN)
2017	2019	Sen. Marco Rubio (R-FL)	Rep. Chris Smith (R-NJ)	Rep. Marcy Kaptur (D-OH)	Sen. Dianne Feinstein (D-CA)
2019	2021	Rep. Jim McGovern (D-MA)	Sen. Marco Rubio (R-FL)	Sen. Dianne Feinstein (D-CA)	Rep. Chris Smith (R-NJ)
2021	2023	Sen. Jeff Merkley (D-OR)	Rep. Jim McGovern (D-MA)	Rep. Chris Smith (R-NJ)	Sen. Marco Rubio (R-FL)
2023	2025	Rep. Chris Smith (R-NJ)	Sen. Jeff Merkley (D-OR)	Sen. Marco Rubio (R-FL)	Rep. Jim McGovern (D-MA)
2025	present	Sen. Dan Sullivan (R-AK)	Rep. Chris Smith (R-NJ)	Rep. Jim McGovern (D-MA)	Sen. Jeff Merkley (D-OR)

== See also ==
- United States House Select Committee on Strategic Competition between the United States and the Chinese Communist Party
