= Jeffrey Garten =

American economist (born 1946)

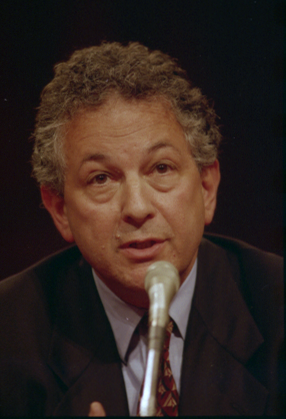
- Garten testifying before the Senate Governmental Affairs Committee, 1997
- Born: October 29, 1946 (age 80)
- Occupations: Economist; academic; investor; author
- Spouse: Ina Rosenberg (m. 1968)

Academic background
- Education: Dartmouth College (BA); Johns Hopkins University (MA, PhD)

Academic work
- Institutions: Columbia Business School; Yale School of Management

United States Under Secretary of Commerce for International Trade
- In office July 1993 – September 1995
- President: Bill Clinton
- Preceded by: J. Michael Farren
- Succeeded by: Stuart E. Eizenstat

Military service
- Branch/service: United States Army
- Years of service: 1968–1972
- Rank: Captain
- Unit: 82nd Airborne Division; United States Army Special Forces
- Battles/wars: Vietnam War

Jeffrey E. Garten (born 1946) is an American economist, author, businessman, and former government official who is Dean Emeritus at the Yale School of Management, where he teaches a variety of courses on global economy. From 1996 to 2005 he was the dean of the school, and from 2005 to 2015 he was the Juan Trippe Professor in international trade, finance, and business. Before that, he was Undersecretary of Commerce for International Trade in the Clinton administration from 1993 to 1995, and had a career on Wall Street as a managing director for the Blackstone Group and Lehman Brothers.

He is the author of six books on the global political economy and numerous articles in The New York Times, The Wall Street Journal, Financial Times, Newsweek, Foreign Affairs, and Harvard Business Review. From 1997 to 2005 he wrote a monthly column in Business Week.

== Early life and career ==
Garten was born to a Jewish family. He is the son of Ruth (née Engelman) and Melvin Garten. His father fought in World War II, the Korean War, and Vietnam; and was awarded the Distinguished Service Cross in 1953 for his heroism in Korea's Battle of Pork Chop Hill. His brother, Allan Garten, is a retired federal prosecutor in Portland, Oregon. Due to Melvin Garten's military career, the family moved frequently.

=== Education ===
Garten graduated from Phillips Andover in 1964, later earning his A.B. from Dartmouth College in 1968 and an M.A. (1972) and Ph.D. (1980) from the Johns Hopkins University's School of Advanced International Studies. He also served in the United States Army from 1968 to 1972, during the Vietnam War, holding the rank of Lieutenant in the 82nd Airborne Division and Captain and aide-de camp to the commanding general of the US Special Forces. In 1971 he was an advisor to the Royal Thai Army.

=== Career ===
Garten worked in the Nixon, Ford and Carter administrations in both the White House and at the State Department. He then went on to Wall Street, becoming a managing director of Lehman Brothers and, later, the Blackstone Group. At Lehman, he specialized in sovereign debt restructuring in Latin America. He also lived in Tokyo and directed and expanded the Asian investment banking business for that firm, including overseeing some of the largest international corporate restructurings of the era. At Blackstone he worked in the financial advisory and mergers and acquisitions arena. Garten founded the Eliot Group, an investments firm, in 1990, and was its first chairman. He then taught at Columbia Business School from 1992 to 1993.

From July 1993 to September 1995, Garten was Undersecretary of Commerce for International Trade in the Clinton administration where he focused his efforts on trade and investment deals in "Big Emerging Markets" such as China, India, Indonesia, Brazil, Mexico, and Turkey. Afterward, from 1996 to 2005, Garten was dean of the Yale School of Management after which he stayed on to teach full-time. His courses have included "Leading A Global Company", "Wall Street and Washington", "Managing Global Catastrophes", and "The Future of Global Finance", and he has led study trips for students to China, Singapore, the United Arab Emirates, and the United Kingdom.

In 2006, Garten and a colleague, David Rothkopf, set up Garten Rothkopf in Washington to provide strategic advice for global companies, international organizations and governments. In 2016 the firm was sold to The Slate Group, a subsidiary of Graham Holdings, Inc.

Garten is on the Board of Advisors of The International Rescue Committee. Previously, he was a director of Aetna, CarMax, Inc., Standard & Poor's and several mutual funds belonging to Credit Suisse Asset Management, ("the Board of Managers"), Calpine Energy Corporation, Alcan Inc., and The Conference Board, and he served on the international advisory boards of Toyota and the Chicago Climate Exchange.

== Personal life ==
Garten has been married to the former Ina Rosenberg since 1968. Ina Garten hosts Food Network's Be My Guest and Barefoot Contessa, for which she has won six Emmy Awards. She currently hosts the podcast Happy Hour with Ina. She has also written fourteen best-selling cookbooks, including Cooking for Jeffrey in 2016 and a best-selling memoir called Be Ready When the Luck Happens. Garten and his wife live in East Hampton, New York.

== Activities at Yale ==
Garten has been teaching a number of courses at the Yale School of Management:

- "The Future of Global Finance"
- "Managing Global Catastrophes"
- "Wall Street and Washington: Markets, Policies, and Politics"
- "Understanding Global Financial Centers"
- "Leading a Global Company"

He has led the following International Study Trips with Yale students:

- Singapore: Public-Private Governance, 2007, 2008
- New York, London, Dubai, Hong Kong: What Makes a Competitive Financial Center?, 2008, 2009
- Shanghai, Beijing, Hong Kong: China in the Global Financial Market, 2010, 2011, 2012

== Books ==
- A Cold Peace: America, Japan, Germany, and the Struggle for Supremacy. Times Books. 1992. ISBN 978-0812922059.
- The Big Ten: The Big Emerging Markets And How They Will Change Our Lives. Basic Books. 1997. ISBN 978-0465026517.
- Jeffrey Garten, ed. (2000). World View: Global Strategies for the New Economy. Harvard Business School Press. ISBN 978-1578511853.
- The Mind of the C.E.O. Basic Books. 2001. ISBN 978-0465026159.
- The Politics of Fortune: A New Agenda for Business Leaders. Harvard Business Review Press. 2002. ISBN 978-1578518784.
- From Silk to Silicon: The Story of Globalization Through Ten Extraordinary Lives. HarperCollins. 2016. ISBN 978-0062409973.
- Three Days at Camp David: How a Secret Meeting in 1971 Transformed the Global Economy. HarperCollins. 2021. ISBN 978-0062887672.
