= Under Secretary of Commerce for International Trade =

Official in the US Department of Commerce

United States Under Secretary of Commerce for International Trade
- Seal of the International Trade Organization

- Flag of an under secretary of commerce

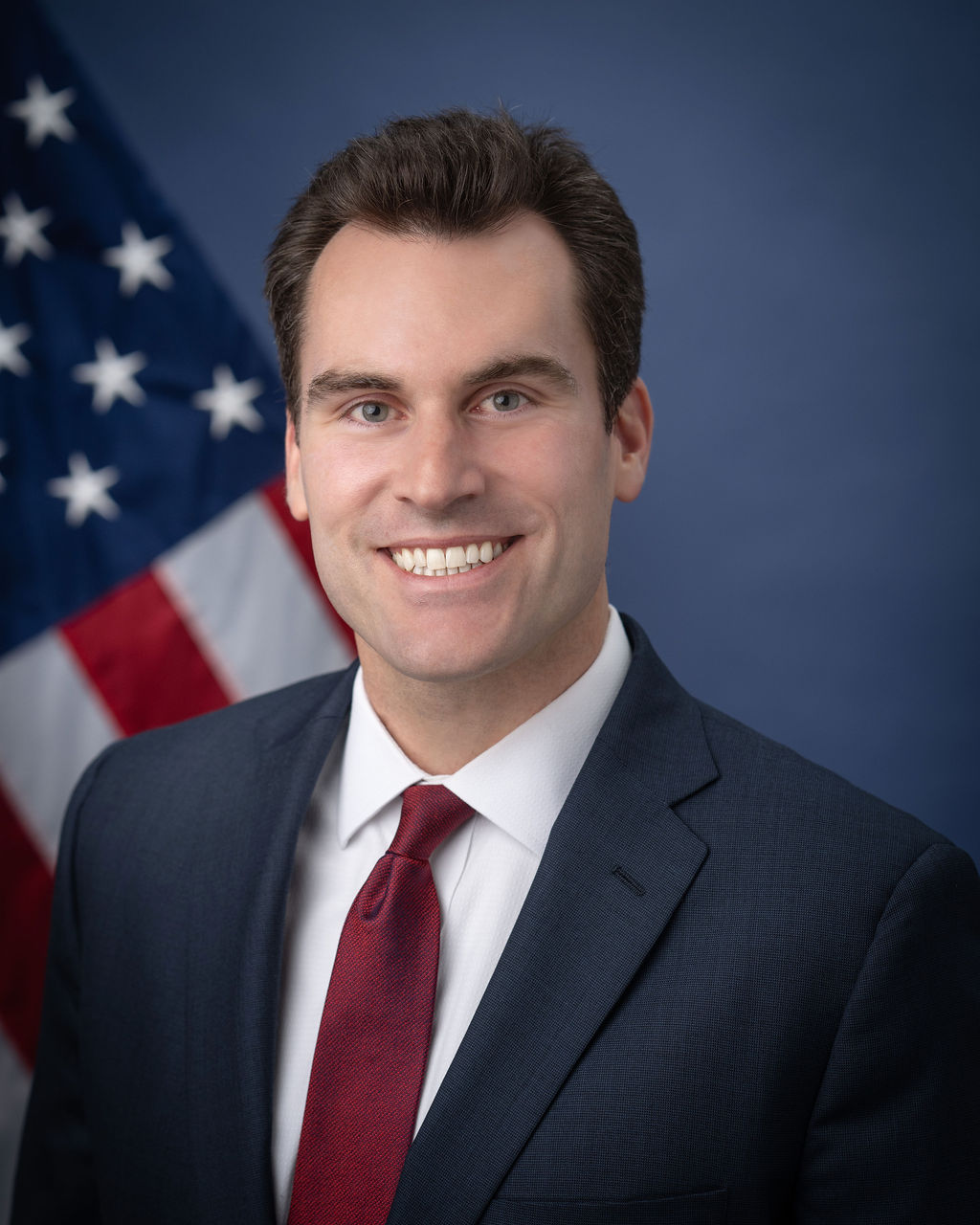
- Incumbent; William Kimmitt since August 8, 2025
- Appointer: The president; with Senate advice and consent
- Formation: January 1, 1989
- Website: Official website

The under secretary of commerce for international trade (USC(IT)) is a high-ranking official of the U.S. Department of Commerce, and is the principal adviser to the secretary of commerce on American imports and exports. The under secretary is the head of the International Trade Administration within the Commerce Department.

The under secretary is appointed by the president of the United States with the consent of the United States Senate. Gilbert B. Kaplan was nominated by President Trump for the position of Under Secretary for International Trade on April 11, 2017, and confirmed by the Senate on March 13, 2018. Gilbert Kaplan left the position in late 2019. President Biden appointed Marisa Lago as undersecretary in 2021. As of 2025, the ITA is headed by Under Secretary of Commerce for International Trade William Kimmitt, with Diane Farrell serving as Deputy Under Secretary.

== Overview ==
The under secretary is the principal officer of the United States Department of Commerce charged with promoting American exports and assisting general international trade. As the Administrator of the International Trade Administration, the under secretary serves as a member of the Tourism Policy Council and the National Intellectual Property Council. The under secretary participates in the development of United States trade policy, identifies and resolves market access and compliance issues, administers American trade laws, and undertakes a range of trade promotion and trade advocacy efforts.

With the rank of under secretary, the USC(IT) is a Level III position within the Executive Schedule. Since January 2014, the annual rate of pay for Level III appointees is $167,000.

== Reporting officials ==
Officials reporting to the USC(IT) include:

- Deputy Under Secretary of Commerce for International Trade
- Assistant Secretary of Commerce for Global Markets and Director General of the U.S. & Foreign Commercial Service
- Assistant Secretary of Commerce for Enforcement and Compliance
- Assistant Secretary of Commerce for Industry and Analysis

== List of under secretaries ==
Name	Assumed office	Left office	Appointed by
Robert E. Herzstein	1980	1981	Jimmy Carter
Lionel H. Olmer	1981	1985	Ronald Reagan
S. Bruce Smart	1985	1987	Ronald Reagan
W. Allen Moore	1987	1989	Ronald Reagan
J. Michael Farren	June 1989	May 1992	George H. W. Bush
Timothy Hauser (Acting)	May 1992	1993	George H. W. Bush
Jeffrey Garten	1993	1995	Bill Clinton
David Rothkopf (Acting)	1995	1996	Bill Clinton
Timothy Hauser (Acting)	1996	1996	Bill Clinton
Stuart E. Eizenstat	April 1996	June 6, 1997	Bill Clinton
David L. Aaron	1997	2000	Bill Clinton
Robert LaRussa	2000	2001	Bill Clinton
Timothy Hauser (Acting)	2001	2001	George W. Bush
Grant D. Aldonas	2001	2005	George W. Bush
Rhonda Keenum (Acting)	2025	2005	George W. Bush
Timothy Hauser (Acting)	2005	2005	George W. Bush
Peter Lichtenbaum (Acting)	2005	2005	George W. Bush
Frank Lavin	2005	2007	George W. Bush
Michelle O'Neill (Acting)	2007	December 19, 2007	George W. Bush
Christopher A. Padilla	December 19, 2007	January 20, 2009	George W. Bush
Frank Sanchez	March 29, 2010	November 6, 2013	Barack Obama
Kenneth E. Hyatt (Acting)	November 6, 2013	June 4, 2014	Barack Obama
Stefan M. Selig	June 4, 2014	June 2016	Barack Obama
Kenneth E. Hyatt (Acting)	June 2016	March 20, 2018	Barack Obama
Gilbert B. Kaplan	March 20, 2018	September 19, 2019	Donald Trump
Joseph C. Semsar (Acting)	October 2019	January 20, 2021	Donald Trump
Diane Farrell (Acting)	January 20, 2021	December 28, 2021	Joe Biden
Marisa Lago	December 28, 2021	January 20, 2025	Joe Biden
Trevor Kellogg (Acting)	January 20, 2025	August 8, 2025	Donald Trump
William Kimmitt	August 8, 2025	Incumbent	Donald Trump
