= Arun M. Kumar =

Chairman and CEO at KPMG in India

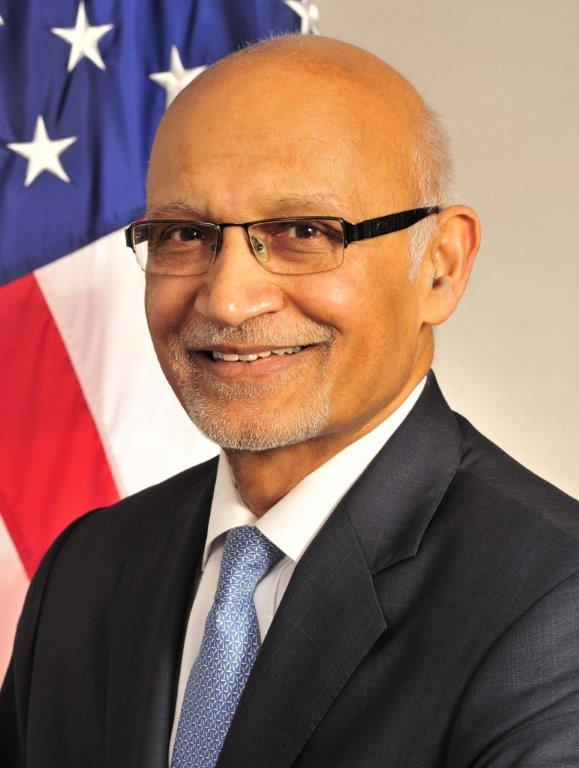
- Arun M. Kumar

Former chairman and chief executive officer KPMG in India
- In office February, 2017 – February, 2022
- Preceded by: Richard Rekhy
- Succeeded by: Yezdi Nagporewalla

Personal details
- Born: 1952 (age 73–74) Mavelikkara, Kerala
- Spouse: Poornima Kumar
- Education: The Lawrence School, Lovedale; Massachusetts Institute of Technology (Master of Science in Management)
- Profession: Management Consulting, Venture Capital, Diplomacy
- Website: https://www.arunmkumar.com

Arun M. Kumar (born 25 November 1952) is a Managing Partner with Celesta Capital. Prior to his current role with Celesta Capital, Kumar served as the chairman and CEO of KPMG in India for a five year term that ended on February 6, 2022. He succeeded Richard Rekhy. Prior to leading KPMG in India, Kumar served as Assistant Secretary of Commerce for Global Markets and director general of the US and Foreign Commercial Service (USFCS) in the administration of former U.S. President Barack Obama.

== Career ==
=== KPMG in India ===
Under Kumar’s leadership, KPMG in India overcame several challenges over a period of five years. Today in India, KPMG has the second largest workforce for KPMG across the world with over 32,000 employees. With Kumar at helm, KPMG in India is said to have focused on specific areas of growth – ranging from special situations to do with stressed assets to cyber security. Kumar took action to ensure that the Firm leverages on talent and skill availability in India to serve markets in proximate areas from Africa to East Asia.

=== Assistant Secretary of Commerce for Global Markets & Director General of the U.S. and Foreign Commercial service ===
Kumar was nominated by President Obama on October 4, 2013, and confirmed by the U.S. Senate on March 13, 2014. In his role as one of the top commercial diplomats of the United States, Kumar led the trade and investment promotion efforts for the U.S. Government responsible for a team of 1600 professionals located in over 100 U.S. cities and 78 world markets. He also served as the International Trade Administration's lead official advocating for better market access for U.S. exporters. During his tenure he visited over 30 countries, led dialogues with countries ranging from France to Indonesia and led trade missions to Colombia, Chile, Kenya, Mozambique, Singapore, South Africa, Turkey and Vietnam and represented the U.S. at economic forums in numerous countries including Canada, China, Indonesia, Kazakhstan, Philippines, Saudi Arabia, Sri Lanka, Sweden, Switzerland, Tunisia, the United Arab Emirates and Uzbekistan. In 2016, the Global Markets unit that he led served 28,692 U.S. exporters, mostly small and medium enterprises, assisted U.S. companies win over a hundred deals with foreign governments valued at $50.9 billion that supported about 178,000 American jobs.

Kumar played a key role in strengthening commercial ties between India and the United States by helping establish, working with Commerce Secretary Penny Pritzker, the US-India Strategic & Commercial Dialogue (S&CD) and a renewed US-India CEO Forum. The S&CD placed commerce and business at the center of the U.S.-India relationship spawning bilateral engagement across a spectrum of activities: ease of doing business, engagement in India's efforts to create a new bankruptcy code, encouraging new forms of financing including municipal bonds, co-operation in harmonizing standards, U.S. participation in smart cities development and in the launch of the U.S.-India Innovation Forum. He was member of President Obama's delegation on his historic visit to India as the Chief Guest at the Republic Day celebrations in January 2015. He organized, with Stanford University, a roundtable for Prime Minister Modi on renewable energy during the Prime Minister's visit to Silicon Valley in September 2015.

Kumar oversaw the expansion and institutionalization of SelectUSA, the federal investment promotion initiative of the U.S. Government, that was housed in Global Markets. Successes included two SelectUSA Investment Summits and the U.S. participation in Hannover Messe as partner country in April 2016. Its 2015 and 2016 Investment Summits featured over 2,500 participants from more than 70 international markets.

Kumar initiated the launch of the Commercial Diplomacy Institute (CDI) of the U.S. Department of Commerce with the goal of promoting professional development and intellectual leadership for U.S. government officials engaged in advancing the country's commercial interests. The CDI conducts a series of lectures (“Trade Talks”) and has noted individuals as visiting faculty.

Kumar launched an initiative to focus on urbanization, transportation and power, to increase U.S. exports, launching pilot programs in India, Philippines, Sub Saharan Africa and Mexico. He co-led, with Transportation Secretary Anthony Foxx, a trade mission in this regard to Sub Saharan Africa. The focus on Smart Cities and Infrastructure yielded significant wins for U.S. companies globally

Kumar established an eCommerce Innovation Lab based in Silicon Valley to promote eCommerce channels for exports and a Rural Exports Innovation Lab in Fargo, North Dakota to promote exports from rural America. He also increased a focus on sectoral specialization and service delivery for the Commercial Service. His organization established the Digital Attache’ program to engage on digital economy policy topics in a selected countries. Kumar served on the Foreign Service Board of the United States. He was nominated by President Obama in 2016 as a commissioner on the Organization for Security & Cooperation in Europe (OSCE).

==== Curt Clawson incident ====
On July 25, 2014, Rep. Curt Clawson, a freshman Republican congressman from Florida, mistook Arun M. Kumar and Nisha Biswal (two senior U.S. officials) for representatives of the Indian government during a House hearing. He assured them that, as a U.S. representative, he would support all efforts to facilitate a better relationship between America and "your country" and "your government." Clawson continued on by heaping praise upon India while addressing Biswal and Kumar, apparently unaware of his confusion. Three days later, the incident was featured in Last Week Tonight by John Oliver; the clip of that show went viral and has recorded 3 million views. The incident lead to a wave of criticism across print, television & social media and the blogosphere. According to USA Today, Clawson later said, “I made a mistake in speaking before being fully briefed and I apologize. I’m a quick study, but in this case I shot an air ball.” He was reported to have apologized to both Biswal and Kumar. Peter Beinart contributing editor at The Atlantic termed the incident as silly gaffe that is revealing of our society where whiteness is still a proxy for being American.

=== KPMG LLP ===
Before joining the Obama Administration, Kumar was a partner and member of the board of directors at KPMG LLP. From 2005 until his retirement in September 2013, he led the firm's West Coast Finance Management Consulting practice. He also founded and led the firm's U.S.-- India practice from 2007 to 2013. Kumar initiated, in 2009, the annual India Prospective discussion sponsored by KPMG and held at the Asia Society, New York after each Indian budget presentation to Parliament. He also initiated and helped run, from 2008 to 2013, the annual KPMG Share Forum on Financial Planning, Reporting and Forecasting, bringing together senior financial executives to discuss trends in these areas and publishing a white paper based on the deliberations. Kumar had joined KPMG in 1995 as a finance management leader, and served in KPMG Consulting, which was spun out as BearingPoint Inc. in 2001, before returning to KPMG LLP in 2005.

=== Entrepreneurial years ===
Kumar was founder and CEO of software company Planning & Logic from 1993 to 1995; chief financial officer of Netlabs from 1991 to 1993; CFO of Elite Microelectronics from 1990 to 1991; director of planning and management information at Silicon Graphics from 1989 to 1990; co-founder, CFO, and vice president of operations for mini-superconductor firm Cydrome from 1984 to 1988, and controller of Elxsi from 1980 to 1984. Kumar is also an early Charter Member of TiE in Silicon Valley, which has since grown into the largest organisation of entrepreneurs.

=== TAS ===
Kumar was selected into the TAS (then known as the Tata Administrative Service) in 1973. He served in TAS for five years working with current Tata Group Chairman Emeritus Ratan Tata.

== Early life and education ==
Kumar studied physics in Kerala and earned a Master's in Management from the Sloan School of Management. He was born in Mavelikkara, Kerala. He attended the Lawrence School, Lovedale, completing his high school there. He then studied, as a National Science Talent Scholar, at University College, Trivandrum, graduating with a bachelor's degree in physics in 1972. Kumar left for the U.S. in 1978 for the Massachusetts Institute of Technology's Sloan School of Management, earning a Master of Science in Management (since termed an MBA by Sloan) in 1980.

== Books ==
In 2020, Kumar authored a book of poetry titled, Mantram Beach. The book, published a decade later after his first book of poems “Plain Truths”, explores observations of the unusual in the usual. Both the books cover people and places, evoking stories, making connections across geographies and time. Kumar is also co-editor of “Kerala's Economy: Crouching Tiger, Sacred Cows.” This book is based on one of two conferences he helped convene in Trivandrum, in 2005 and 2007, along with Stanford University, on Kerala in the Global Economy. Kumar has also contributed to the Huffington Post and has authored blogs on a range of topics including public service, American businesses, trade, commerce and global markets.

== Personal ==
Kumar is the eldest son of the late B. Madhavan and Kamala Nair and is married to Poornima Kumar, the daughter of Sarojini Menon and the late noted historian A. Sreedhara Menon. Kumar and his wife Poornima have two sons, Ashvin, married to Melisa Shah, and Vikram, married to Monisha Batra.
