= U.S. Committee of the Blue Shield =

- Blue Shield Emblem identifies protected cultural property
- Abbreviation: USCBS
- Formation: 2006
- Type: Non-governmental not-for-profit
- Website: http://uscbs.org

The U.S. Committee of the Blue Shield (USCBS), founded in 2006, is the United States national committee of the Blue Shield. The Blue Shield was formed according to the provisions of the 1954 Hague Convention for the Protection of Cultural Property in the Event of Armed Conflict, which specifies a symbol of a blue shield for marking protected cultural property. The Blue Shield, of which USCBS is a member, is an organization of affiliated national committees from nations around the globe.

== Formation ==
Founding president of USCBS Corine Wegener served in the U.S. military and was deployed in 2003 to work with the National Museum of Iraq staff immediately after the infamous looting of the museum in Baghdad. After that experience and her retirement from the military, she found herself inspired to form the U.S. Committee of the Blue Shield. USCBS is a membership organization governed by a board of directors composed of prominent cultural property professionals in the areas of law, museums, libraries, archivists, conservation, archaeology, education and architecture. USCBS Board members, Nancy Wilkie and James Reap, serve on the Cultural Property Advisory Committee of the U.S. Department of State. The Smithsonian Institution, the Archaeological Institute of America and US/ICOMOS have entered into Memoranda of Understanding (MoUs) with USCBS.

USCBS was formed as a charitable not-for-profit corporation in 2006. It functions in a similar capacity as the Red Cross (which provides humanitarian relief), by supporting U.S. implementation of the 1954 Hague Convention, which requires the protection of cultural heritage in danger from armed conflict or natural disasters worldwide.

When it was formed, USCBS was required to have support from the American Library Association (ALA), the Society of American Archivists (SAA), the International Council of Museums (ICOM-US), and US National Committee of Monuments and Sites (US/ICOMOS).

== Goals ==
USCBS seeks to raise public awareness about why it is imperative to protect cultural heritage, by coordinating with the U.S. military/government and other similar organizations, by advocating for legal protections and commitments to protect cultural property as laid out in the 1954 Hague Convention, and by preparing and maintaining cultural heritage inventories that identify the locations of potential at-risk cultural sites, such as museums, libraries, archives, religious structures, and archaeological sites, to keep them safe from armed conflict attack. They also assist in protection of cultural property in emergencies and as a result of natural disasters.

== Military training ==
A group of cultural heritage professionals have "gathered together under the banner of the US Committee of the Blue Shield", bringing their civilian skills to help the military where they are lacking in personnel. The Getty Conservation Institute article entitled "Using Inventories to Protect Cultural Property" states that "The US Committee of the Blue Shield and the emerging UK National Committee have become, by default, the main conduits of information to their own militaries and NATO." Photo depicts a training session coordinated by USCBS.

The U.S. Committee of the Blue Shield presented Brig. Gen. Erik Peterson, commanding general of the U.S. Army Special Operations Aviation Command, with the inaugural Meritorious Military Service in Protection of Cultural Property Award in September 2014. In his acceptance speech he said that training service members in the protection of cultural property helps "Soldiers and their leaders become aware, respectful of, and actively protect irreplaceable cultural treasures. These efforts are not only morally right in the eyes of the international community and enlightened people and compliant with law and policy, but they are practical and effective militarily," he said. "They contribute directly to stabilization, unity, conflict termination and post-conflict resolution."

== Cultural heritage inventories ==
In March 2011, USCBS collected and coordinated information to create a list of Libyan cultural property sites. The list was later disseminated to the U.S. military, which maintains lists of cultural property to be avoided during military campaigns. This was instrumental in protecting archaeological sites, libraries, museums, etc. during the NATO air campaign. In January 2015 the J.M. Kaplan Fund awarded USCBS a grant to continue their work on compiling lists of cultural property in the Middle East.

== Advocacy ==
After the notoriety of the looting of sites and museums in Iraq in 2003, the US Committee of the Blue Shield (USCBS) advocated for ratification of The 1954 Hague Convention. The US Committee of the Blue Shield, as part of a consortium of cultural heritage preservation organizations, submitted written testimony to the Senate Foreign Relations Committee in support of ratification. It was pressure from the US Committee of the Blue Shield and others that convinced the US to ratify the 1954 Hague Convention in 2009. On September 10, 2013, USCBS issued a letter to President Barack Obama which requested that cultural property in Syria be protected and that the trade in its looted artifacts be prohibited. In 2017, USCBS presented their Outstanding Public Service Award for the Protection of Cultural Property to Representatives Eliot Engel and Ed Royce who were instrumental in the passage of the Protect and Preserve International Cultural Property Act H.R. 1493/S. 1887. This legislation, which became law in 2016, imposes import restrictions on cultural materials removed illegally from Syria after March 2011, the beginning of the civil war in that country.

== Natural disasters and emergency protection ==
The January 2010 earthquake in Haiti created a situation where volunteers and members of USCBS traveled to the area and were instrumental in setting up a conservation center to help protect cultural artifacts affected by the quake.
