= Superclass =

Superclass may refer to:

- Superclass (book), a book about global governance by David Rothkopf and The Superclass List
- Superclass (biology), a taxonomic rank intermediate between subphylum and class
- Superclass (computer science), a class from which other classes are derived
- Superclass (knowledge representation), a parent class

== See also ==
- Subclass (disambiguation)
