= Andrew Manatos =

Andy Manatos
- Born: July 7, 1944 (age 81); Washington, D.C.
- Education: American University (BA, MA)
- Occupation: Lobbyist
- Children: 4
- Awards: Medal of Saint Paul (Greek Orthodox Archdiocese of America)

Andrew Emanuel "Andy" Manatos (born 1944) is an American lobbyist and a former Assistant Secretary of Commerce in the administration of President Jimmy Carter.

== Early life and education ==
Manatos was born on July 7, 1944, in Washington, D.C., to Dorothy and Mike Manatos. His father, Mike, was White House Assistant for Senate Liaison to presidents John F. Kennedy and Lyndon Johnson. He completed undergraduate studies at American University, where he continued to earn a master's degree in political theory.

== Career ==
Manatos was the youngest Presidential advance man for President Lyndon B. Johnson. Manatos then was a Committee Staff Director in the U.S. Senate and aide to Senators Thomas Eagleton and Gale McGee. In 1977, President Jimmy Carter nominated Manatos to be Assistant Secretary of Commerce. He was the youngest sub-cabinet official in the administration and led the effort that moved the Foreign Commercial Service from the State Department to the Commerce Department.

In 1983, Manatos and his father, Mike, formed the public policy firm, Manatos & Manatos. Andy is CEO of the firm, which he operates with his eldest son, Mike A. Manatos. Clients of Manatos & Manatos have included Fortune 500 Companies, foreign countries, religious leaders, the United States Olympic Committee, and the Smithsonian Institution. He was chosen as one of Washington's most powerful private sector people by Regardies Magazine.

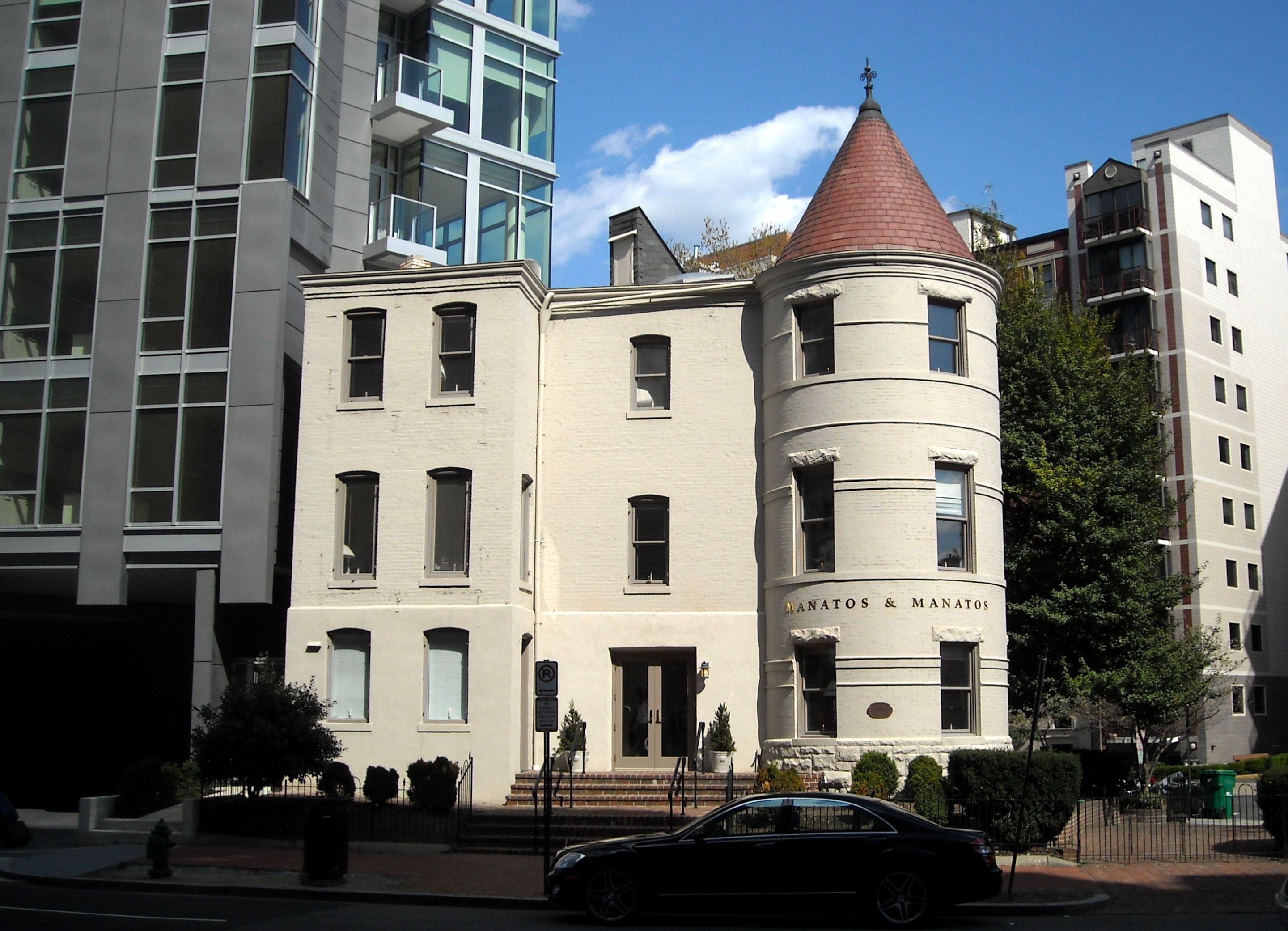
Offices of Manatos and Manatos in West End, Washington, D.C.

Much of Manatos' pro bono work has benefited the Greek-American community in the United States. He created and has maintained for 33 years an annual meeting of that community with the President of the United States. He is on the board of several Hellenic organizations. He was presented the highest recognition from the Archbishop of America, the St. Paul medal, and was also appointed to the Order of St. Andrew by the Ecumenical Patriarch, the spiritual leader of 300 million Orthodox Christians worldwide.

== Personal life ==
Manatos and his wife, Tina, have four sons.

His family comes from the island of Crete, Greece.
