= Stefan M. Selig =

American businessman

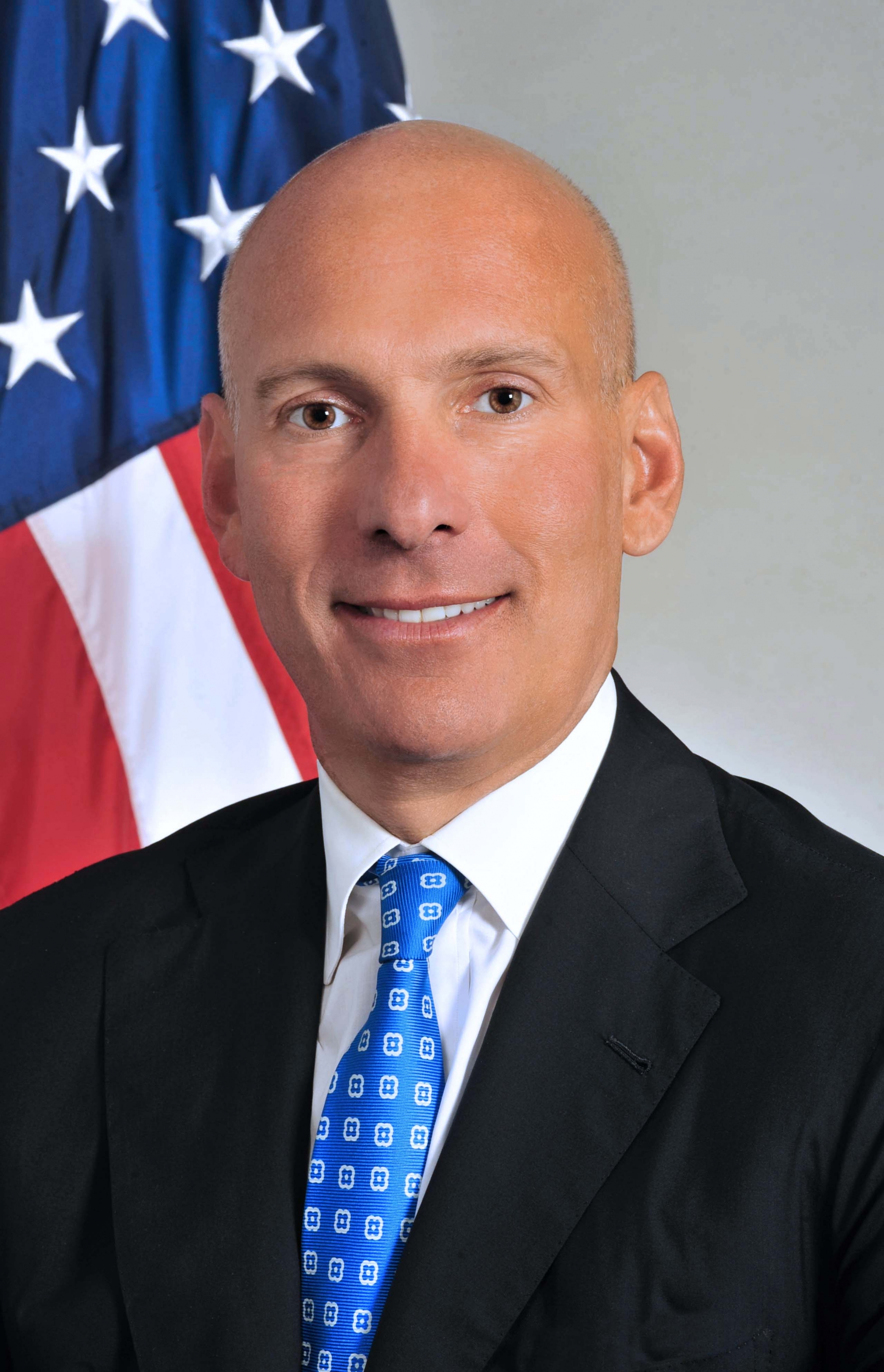

Under Secretary of Commerce for International Trade
- In office June 4, 2014 – June 2016
- President: Barack Obama
- Preceded by: Frank Sanchez
- Succeeded by: Gilbert B. Kaplan

Personal details
- Born: 1963 (age 62–63) New York, New York
- Party: Democratic
- Education: Wesleyan University (B.A.); Harvard University (M.B.A.)
- Profession: Investment Banker

Stefan M. Selig (born 1963) is an American investment banker, and past Under Secretary of Commerce for International Trade at the U.S. Department of Commerce from June 2014 to June 2016. In his role, he was responsible for promoting trade and investment to strengthen the competitiveness of U.S. industry and "improve the global business environment". He advocated for the Trans-Pacific Partnership, negotiated the Transatlantic Trade and Investment Partnership and expanded SelectUSA.

== Early life and education ==
Selig grew up in New York and attended the Dalton School on the Upper East Side. He graduated from Wesleyan University in Middletown, Connecticut with a B.A. in Economics in 1984. Selig completed the Platoon Leaders Class at Officer Candidate School for the United States Marine Corps. He briefly considered the Marine Corps, but instead chose to go into business, attended Harvard Business School, earning an MBA in 1988.

== Career ==
In 1984, Selig joined First Boston Corp, where he worked in the mergers and acquisitions department for the investment bankers Bruce Wasserstein and Joseph Perella. In 1988, he joined Wasserstein's and Perella's own firm, Wasserstein Perella & Co., which has been described as a training ground which helped create "a dynasty of bankers and executives that has spread throughout Wall Street and corporate America".

Later he became a partner at Berenson Minella & Co., a boutique investment bank where he organized high-profile buyouts.

In 1994, Selig joined UBS as head of its financial sponsor group and as co-head of mergers and acquisitions. He moved to Société Générale in 1998, and then Bank of America from 1999 until 2014. He rose to executive vice chairman of global corporate and investment banking, where he was "known for advising on consumer and retail deals". From 2007 to 2010 he worked on deals for L Brands, parent company of Victoria’s Secret and Bath & Body Works to buyout firm Sun Capital Partners Inc, and in 2013 on the sale of Yankee Candle Co. to Jarden Corp. for $1.75 billion.

=== Under Secretary for International Trade, 2014-16 ===
In November 2013, President Barack Obama nominated Selig as Under Secretary for International Trade at the Department of Commerce to replace Frank Sanchez.

During the United States congressional hearing before the Senate Committee on Finance on 8 May 2014 it became known that Selig invested in offshore funds of buy-out firm Sun Capital Partners Fund V, which in 2010 was domiciled in the Cayman Islands, including at the Ugland House. Orrin Hatch (R) reminded the committee that President Obama had characterized these types of investments as "betting against America" during his 2012 election campaign. Selig was also the Executive Director of the Travel and Tourism Advisory Board and on the Board of Directors of the Overseas Private Investment Corporation (OPIC).

==== Agenda ====
Upon his confirmation on June 14, 2014, Selig oversaw more than 2,200 trade and investment professionals, based in 110 U.S. cities and 77 countries, where he deployed a budget of over $500 million. In 2015, he expanded SelectUSA, the first federal effort to promote the US as the world’s most attractive investment destination.

Along with advocacy for the Trans-Pacific Partnership, he led the International Trade Administration to strengthen U.S. industry competitiveness, promote trade and investment and to improve the global business environment. In May 2015, he rejected EU concerns that the arbitration panel for investor-state dispute settlement would allow companies to bypass national courts, calling criticism that it undermined governments' right to regulate "misguided". Selig thought the TPP would go through in 2016. In 2015, Selig´s teams reauthorized Trade Promotion Authority for the first time in thirteen years, concluded the Information Technology Agreement, a World Trade Organization agreement which covers 200 information and communications technology products valued at $1 trillion in global trade and negotiated the Transatlantic Trade and Investment Partnership. He established the U.S.-India Strategic and Commercial Dialogue the U.S.-Japan Commercial Dialogue, and the U.S.-Argentina Commercial Dialogue. In 2014, Selig achieved outcomes with the Mexican Government through the High-Level Economic Dialogue, co-chaired by Vice President Biden.

He was commissioner for the Congressional Executive Commission on China, directed the President’s Advisory Council on Doing Business in Africa and has been a lifetime member of the Council on Foreign Relations. He revamped operations and priorities for U.S. commercial diplomacy staff.

==== Investigation ====
In late June 2016, Selig left the Commerce Department as the Inspector General's office was completing an investigation into his business expense reimbursements for luxury hotels while traveling. Selig claimed in a letter to the editor that he had "followed proper protocol" and delegated the handling of his travel expenses. The Inspector General's report summarized that Selig did not obtain questionable reimbursements."

=== Business career, 2016-present ===
After an extended vacation in 2016 Selig was a representative of CDX ADVISORS from 2017 - 2018. In 2017 Selig founded BridgePark Advisors, and in 2019 he became a partner of LSH Partners, a boutique investment bank in NYC. He has been chairman of a number of public companies including Rotor Acquisition in 2021 and Venator Materials in 2023.

In 2023 and 2024 he appeared on CNBC and Bloomberg with contributions about geopolitical implications of US-China trade and US elections. Selig also advises on corporate restructurings, including the bankruptcy of Northvolt in 2024.

== Personal life ==
As of 2016 Selig was married to Heidi Selig. Selig previously served as a member of the board of directors of Lincoln Center for the Performing Arts and Services for the UnderServed, which supports individuals and families facing challenging situations. In 2014 they sold an apartment on Park Avenue for 9 million USD.

== See also ==
- Revolving door (politics)
