= Frank Sánchez =

Frank Sánchez may refer to:

- Frank Sánchez (lawyer), American lawyer, business advisor and government official
- Frank Sánchez (boxer), Cuban boxer
