= Convention on Cultural Property Implementation Act =

US federal law

- Long title: An Act to reduce certain duties, to suspend temporarily certain duties, to extend certain existing suspensions of duties, and for other purposes.

Citations
- Public law: Pub. L. 97–446
- Statutes at Large: 96 Stat. 2329

Codification
- U.S.C. sections created: 19 U.S.C. §§ 2601–2613

Legislative history
- Introduced in the House as H.R. 4566 by Sam Gibbons on September 23, 1981; Committee consideration by United States Senate Committee on Finance; Signed into law by President Ronald Reagan on January 12, 1983

The Convention on Cultural Property Implementation Act (CCPIA or CPIA) is a United States Act of Congress that became federal law in 1983. The CCPIA implemented the 1970 UNESCO Convention on the Means of Prohibiting and Preventing the Illicit Import, Export and Transfer of Ownership of Cultural Property. It restricts the importation of some archaeological and ethnological materials into the United States from other State Parties to the Convention.

== Provisions ==
=== Import restrictions ===
The CCPIA implemented Articles 7(b) and 9 of the UNESCO Convention. It delegates authority to impose import restrictions of archaeological and ethnological materials from other State Parties to the Convention. The CCPIA authorizes three types of restrictions:

1. Bilateral or Multilateral Agreements: The President may enter into a bilateral agreement with a State Party or multilateral agreement (whether or not State Parties) to apply import restrictions.
2. Emergency Implementation: If the President determines that there is a risk of pillage, dismantling, dispersal, or fragmentation of a specific type of archaeological or ethnological object or site, the President may apply import restrictions.
3. Stolen Cultural Property: Cultural property that has been documented in the inventory of a State Party's museum, religious or secular public monument, or similar institution cannot be imported into the United States.

Any cultural property that is imported into the United States in violation of the import restrictions is subject to seizure and forfeiture.

=== Cultural Property Advisory Committee (CPAC) ===
The CCPIA also establishes the Cultural Property Advisory Committee. The Committee investigates each State Party's request, reporting its findings and making recommendations to the President. The President appoints the Committee's eleven members:

- Two members represent the interests of museums
- Three members are experts in archaeology, anthropology, ethnology, or related areas.
- Three members are experts in the international sale of cultural property.
- Three members represent the interest of the general public.

== Legislative history ==
=== 1970 UNESCO Convention ===
The United States Senate unanimously gave its advice and consent to ratify the 1970 UNESCO Convention on August 11, 1972. The Convention was a non-self-executing treaty.

=== Implementation attempts ===
After ratifying the Convention in 1972, Congress proposed multiple bills to implement it.

- S. 2677
- H.R. 14171
- H.R. 5643
- H.R. 3403

=== H.R. 4566 ===
One primary goal for the CCPIA was to maintain good foreign relations. The Senate Finance Committee acknowledged that the United States is a principal market for art and antiquities. The Committee believed that allowing stolen or valuable cultural property to be imported into the United States would damage relations with countries from which the archaeological and ethnological materials originated.

Another reason for the bill was the growing interest in Native American, Hawaiian, and Alaskan cultural property in the international art market. Through the CCPIA, the Committee wanted to encourage international cooperation to control the trafficking of these archaeological and ethnological objects.

The final version of the CCPIA was the result of negotiations and compromises between parties for and against the bill. Proponents of the legislation included art museums, archaeologists, and some academics; opponents of the bill included art and antiquities dealers, private collectors, and some academics.

==== S. 1723 ====
In the 97th Congress, the CCPIA was first proposed as S. 1723. On September 15, 1982, H.R. 4566 incorporated S. 1723.

==== Amendments to the bill ====
To accommodate private sector interests, the Senate Finance Committee amended the bill so that the United States could not establish import controls unilaterally. Instead, the President is required to obtain international cooperation and ensure that restricting importation is part of a concerted international effort.

Another amendment to the bill draft was related to the Cultural Property Advisory Committee. Previous versions of the statute had named the specific associations from which the President would be required to select his appointments. This limitation was removed, as the restriction was an infringement on the President's constitutional appointment powers.

The original draft of the bill allowed only judicial forfeiture proceedings. However, the Senate Finance Committee amended the bill to allow summary forfeiture proceedings as well. It believed that some cultural property subject to forfeiture under the CCPIA would be small in value and that neither the government nor the claimant would want to bear the cost of judicial proceedings.

== Litigation ==
=== Burden of proof ===
In forfeiture cases under the CCPIA, the government bears the initial burden of proof of showing that the CCPIA applies to the contested objects. The government must demonstrate probable cause. Once the government meets this initial burden, claimant has the burden of establishing, by a preponderance of the evidence, that the object is not subject to forfeiture.

=== Cases ===
==== United States v. An Original Manuscript Dated November 19, 1778 ====
The government won a forfeiture case concerning a manuscript bearing the signature of Junipero Serra. The manuscript had been part of the Mexican National Archives and had been published in the Archive's microfilm records in 1993. In 1996, Claimant Dana Toft purchased the manuscript from a dealer in a hotel room and paid $16,000 in cash. When Toft consigned the manuscript to Sotheby's, the Mexican National Archives requested its return from Sotheby's.

The United States District Court for the Southern District of New York held that the United States provided sufficient evidence that the manuscript belonged to the Mexican National Archives and had been stolen after CCPIA went into effect. Thus, the court found the manuscript had been imported in violation of the CCPIA.

The court rejected Toft's innocent purchaser defense. Toft had not questioned the meeting with the dealing in the hotel room nor the exchange of $16,000 in cash, and the court found Toft had been willfully blind. The court also found that Toft was not owed compensation because Mexico showed that, in similar circumstances, it would recover and return an article stolen from a U.S. institution without requiring compensation.

==== United States v. Eighteenth Century Peruvian Oil on Canvas Painting of Doble Trinidad ====
The government won the forfeiture of two colonial-era Peruvian paintings. Claimant, a Bolivian citizen, imported the paintings into the United States in 2005, taking them to a gallery for restoration and consignment. Because the paintings had been crudely cut out from their frames, an art dealer suspected they had been stolen and contacted the FBI. The FBI seized the paintings. The government and claimant provided conflicting evidence: the FBI concluded the paintings came from Peru; claimant provided documentation that the paintings came from Bolivia.

The United States District Court for the Eastern District of Virginia concluded that, either way, Claimant still needed to provide documentation authorizing import of the paintings because both Peru and Bolivia are State Parties to the UNESCO Convention and both have import restriction agreements with the United States. Because Claimant could not provide such documentation, the paintings were subject to forfeiture.

==== United States v. Twenty-Nine Pre-Columbian & Colonial Artifacts From Peru ====
In 2010, United States Customs and Border Protection (CBP) seized Pre-Columbian and Colonial textiles, metals, lithics, and perishable remains from Peru at Miami International Airport. Claimant moved to dismiss for lack of subject matter jurisdiction, failure to state a claim, and denial of due process of law.

First, the United States District Court for the Southern District of Florida found that the court did have subject matter jurisdiction. The court rejected Claimant's argument that the United States Court of International Trade had exclusive jurisdiction on the action.

Second, the court found that the United States sufficiently stated a claim by showing the imported objects were protected material under the CCPIA.

Third, the court rejected the claimant's argument that he was denied due process during CBP seizure proceedings because the CCPIA authorizes 90 days of artifact detention, and claimant did not protest the seizure despite notice and an opportunity to protest.

==== Ancient Coin Collectors Guild cases ====
The Ancient Coin Collectors Guild purchased twenty-two coins from a numismatic dealer in London in April 2009. The collection included twelve Chinese coins and seven Cypriot coins. When the Guild attempted to import the coins later that month, the U.S. Customs and Border Protection seized the property. Agreements with both China and Cyprus, under the CCPIA, were in effect at this time.

When the coins were seized, the Guild brought suit against various government departments, including the United States Department of State and U.S. Customs and Border Protection, challenging the legality of the CCPIA and its various provisions. After various appeals and remands, the courts rejected these challenges.

When the United States brought a civil forfeiture proceeding against the twenty-three coins, the United States District Court for the District of Maryland held that fifteen of the coins were subject to forfeiture. The United States Court of Appeals for the Fourth Circuit affirmed.

== Current protections ==
- State Parties to the Convention: 19 CFR 12.104
- Currently protected items by agreement or emergency actions: 19 CFR 12.104

== See also ==
- National Stolen Property Act
- Archaeological Resources Protection Act of 1979
