= US/ICOMOS International Exchange Program =

The US/ICOMOS International Exchange Program is an exchange program for young professions in historic preservation through the United States National Committee of the International Council on Monuments and Sites. The aim of the program is to promote an understanding of international preservation policies, methods and techniques that lead to a continuing dialogue between countries. As of 2007, nearly 600 young preservation professionals and over 70 countries have participated in this program since its creation in 1984.

== Program Overview ==
The program began with a one-time exchange between US/ICOMOS and ICOMOS United Kingdom. It since has expanded to involve between 20 and 30 young preservation professionals each year. US/ICOMOS internships are geared toward individuals who are in their last year of a relevant graduate program or have been working for 1–3 years in a professional capacity. The program is very competitive in that only 1 in 5 applicants are awarded internships in any given year.

Interns are selected on a competitive basis for participation in the US/ICOMOS International Exchange Program. Internships are approximately 12 weeks in length and are usually held during the summer (from June to August), although some internships may be held at other times of the year. US/ICOMOS hosts all U.S. and international interns for a program orientation in Washington, DC. Interns then disperse to their various host organizations where they complete a preservation-related project designed by the host organization. At the end of the summer, all interns reconvene in Washington, DC for a final farewell program.

The program is made possible through generous grants from many U.S. foundations, government agencies and individual contributors, and ICOMOS National Committees of participating countries.

== Intern Qualifications ==
Interns must be graduate students or young professionals with at minimum an undergraduate degree in a preservation-related field. Candidates are asked to submit a curriculum vitae, two letters of recommendation, a 500-word essay describing their reasons for wanting to participate in the program, and examples of their work. Participants are selected on the basis of skill, demonstrated commitment to historic preservation, previous experience and academic concentration in the field and the ability to represent their country in an exchange program. In addition, interns are chosen whose skills, training, interest and previous experience match the needs of host organizations. Applications submitted by U.S. citizens are selected for specific internships by a jury of professional members of US/ICOMOS; applications from other ICOMOS national committees are screened at the national committee level, and then forwarded to US/ICOMOS for selection and assignments. The file of the strongest candidate(s) for a particular internship is sent to the host office (in the U.S. and in participating countries) for review and final approval.
