= Subtype =

Subtype may refer to:

- Viral subtypes, such as Subtypes of HIV
- Subtyping, a form of type polymorphism in programming language theory

== See also ==
- Subclass (disambiguation)
