= Frank Lavin =

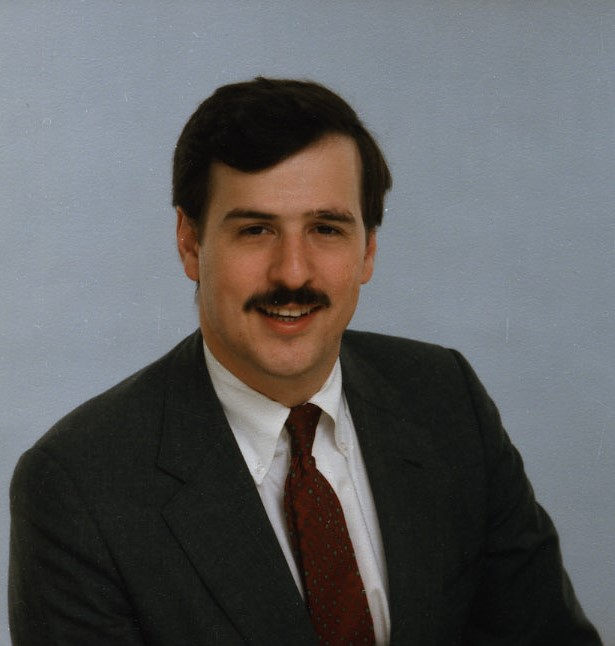
- Lavin in 1987

United States Ambassador to Singapore
- In office September 10, 2001 – October 11, 2005
- President: George W. Bush
- Preceded by: Steven Green
- Succeeded by: Patricia Herbold

White House Director of Political Affairs
- In office March 16, 1987 – January 20, 1989 Serving with Frank Donatelli
- President: Ronald Reagan
- Preceded by: Haley Barbour
- Succeeded by: James Wray

Personal details
- Born: October 26, 1957 (age 68) Canton, Ohio, U.S.
- Party: Republican
- Education: Georgetown University (BS, MS); Johns Hopkins University (MA); University of Pennsylvania (MBA)

Military service
- Allegiance: United States
- Branch/service: United States Navy
- Rank: Lieutenant commander
- Unit: U.S. Naval Reserve

Franklin L. Lavin (born October 26, 1957) is a former Republican White House aide who was the political director for Ronald Reagan between 1987 and 1989, a United States diplomat, U.S. naval officer, and a bank executive.

== Early life and education ==
Lavin is from Ohio and graduated from Phillips Academy Andover in 1975. He later earned a B.S. from the School of Foreign Service at Georgetown University; a M.S. in Chinese language from Georgetown University; a M.A. in International Relations and International Economics from the School of Advanced International Studies at the Johns Hopkins University; and an MBA in Finance at the Wharton School at the University of Pennsylvania.

== Career ==
As Under Secretary of Commerce for International Trade, Lavin headed the International Trade Administration for the United States Department of Commerce from 2005 until 2007.

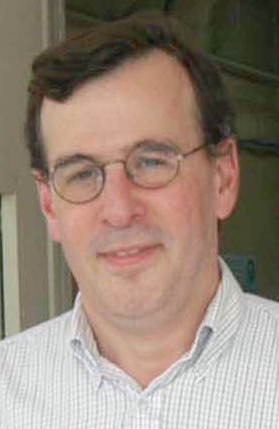
Lavin in 2005

From August 2001 to 2005, Lavin served as the United States Ambassador to Singapore.

As of September 2001, Lavin is an officer in the United States Navy's reserve.

A 2005 report by the Office of the Inspector General of the Department of State praised Lavin's leadership in this position, calling him "a strong leader with a high degree of intellectual curiosity who wants to be kept well-briefed by all agencies, and yet lets people do their jobs without micromanaging".

From 2011 to 2023, Lavin served as CEO of Export Now, a company dedicated to helping consumer brands sell their products in China.

In August 2016, Lavin endorsed Democratic candidate Hillary Clinton in the 2016 presidential election.

In 2020, Lavin, along with over 130 other former Republican national security officials, signed a statement that asserted that President Trump was unfit to serve another term, and "To that end, we are firmly convinced that it is in the best interest of our nation that Vice President Joe Biden be elected as the next President of the United States, and we will vote for him."

== Personal life ==
Frank Lavin and his wife Ann (née Wortley) have been married since November 29, 1980. They have three children. His father was a soldier in World War II.

== Selected publications ==
- Lavin, Frank, and Henry Kissinger. Home Front to Battlefront: An Ohio Teenager in World War II. Athens, OH: Ohio University Press, 2017. ISBN 9780821445921

== Political Service ==
- Official website
- Appearances on C-SPAN

Political offices
| Preceded by Haley Barbour | White House Director of Political Affairs; 1987–1989; Served alongside: Frank Donatelli (Political and Intergovernmental Affairs) | Succeeded by James Wray |
Diplomatic posts
| Preceded by Steven Green | United States Ambassador to Singapore; 2001–2005 | Succeeded by Patricia Herbold |
Political offices
| Preceded by Grant D. Aldonas | United States Under Secretary of Commerce for International Trade; 2005–2007 | Succeeded by Christopher A. Padilla |
