= Customs ruling =

Customs rulings are binding administrative decisions issued by U.S. Customs and Border Protection (CBP) pursuant to 19 C.F.R. Part 177. Rulings may address customs related matters, including United States tariff classification, marking, and valuation. CBP may issue such rulings to any importer or exporter of merchandise; to any individual or business entity that has a direct and demonstrable interest in the matters or questions presented in the ruling request; or to an agent (such as attorney) of either of the aforementioned parties. Rulings may only be prospective and in response to a ruling request.

Rulings are written by Regulations and Rulings (R&R), a division of CBP's Office of Trade (renamed from Office of International Trade on February 24, 2016). Certain ruling subject matter is handled by the National Commodity Specialist Division (NCSD), a section of R&R which is located in New York City.

CBP issues new rulings regularly. They are available to the public at no cost through CBP desktop website CROSS or mobile-friendly website CustomsMobile, which provides advanced search options over CROSS. Subscription-based commercial services, such as Lexis-Nexis and Customs Info, also provide access to Customs rulings.
