= Gilbert B. Kaplan =

American lawyer (born 1951)

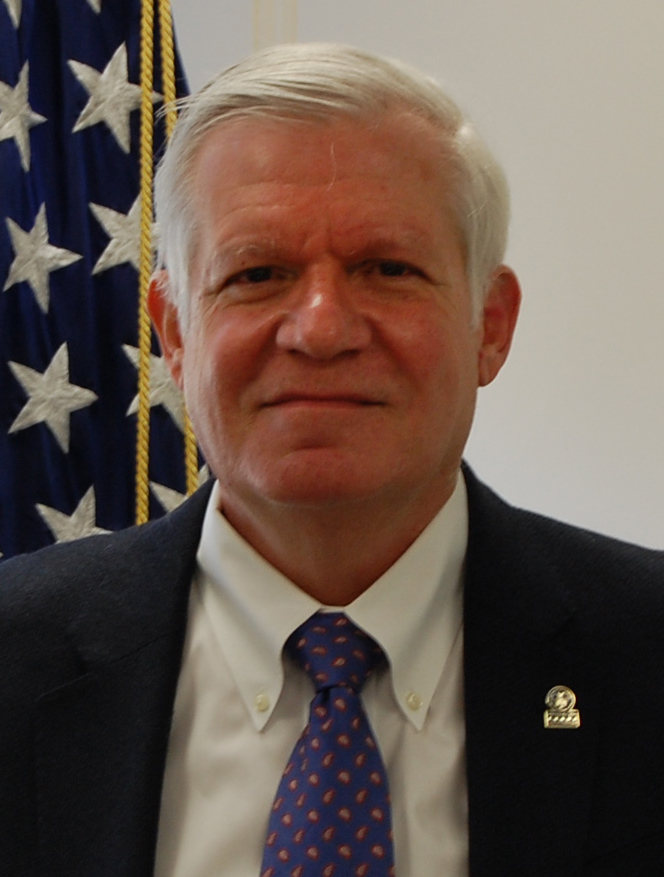

Under Secretary of Commerce for International Trade
- In office March 20, 2018 – September 19, 2019
- President: Donald Trump
- Preceded by: Stefan M. Selig
- Succeeded by: Marisa Lago

Personal details
- Born: Gilbert Bruce Kaplan; July 9, 1951 (age 74) Endicott, New York, U.S.
- Education: Harvard University; Harvard Law School

Gilbert Bruce Kaplan (born July 9, 1951) is an American attorney and former Under Secretary of Commerce for International Trade in the United States Department of Commerce. Prior to his role at Commerce, Kaplan was a partner at King & Spalding, and is the co-founder of the Manufacturing Policy Initiative at Indiana University School of Public and Environmental Affairs. During the administration of Ronald Reagan, Kaplan served as Deputy Assistant Secretary, Acting Assistant Secretary of Commerce for Import Administration, and Director of the Office of Investigations at the Department of Commerce. A former steel industry lobbyist, he has won cases against China.

Kaplan resigned his position at Commerce on September 19, 2019.
