= Protect and Preserve International Cultural Property Act =

- Long title: An Act to protect and preserve international cultural property at risk due to political instability, armed conflict, or natural or other disasters, and for other purposes.

Legislative history
- Passed the House on June 6, 2015; Passed the Senate on April 13, 2016 with amendment; House agreed to Senate amendment on April 26, 2016 (); Signed into law by President Barack Obama on May 9, 2016

The Protect and Preserve International Cultural Property Act H.R. 1493 is a United States Act of Congress that became law in 2016.

== Provisions ==
The bill urges the President (Barack Obama at the time) to establish an interagency coordinating committee to "advance executive branch efforts to protect and preserve international cultural property at risk from political instability, armed conflict, or natural or other disasters".

It also establishes the President should apply import restrictions specifically targeting archaeological or ethnological material from Syria. Such restrictions include those for "illicit import, export, and transfer of ownership of cultural property" (adopted by UNESCO).

The President is to determine yearly whether at least one of the following is met: 1) "Syria is incapable of fulfilling the requirements to request an agreement according to the Convention on Cultural Property Implementation Act; 2) "it would be against the U.S. national interest to enter into such an agreement".

Import restrictions may be waived for "specified cultural property if the President certifies to Congress that": 1) "the foreign owner or custodian of the specified cultural property" requests it is temporarily located in the US for protection; 2) the property is to be returned upon request to its foreign owner or custodian; 3) grants of waivers do not contribute to illegal trafficking in "cultural property or financing of criminal or terrorist activities".

Archaeological or ethnological material entering the US pursuant to a waiver shall have immunity from seizure under P.L. 89-259.

Finally, the President is to report to Congress annually "on executive branch efforts to protect and preserve international cultural property".
