= Frank Sánchez (lawyer) =

American lawyer and business advisor

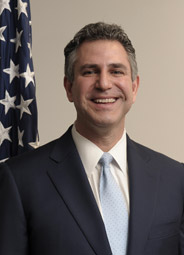

Under Secretary of Commerce for International Trade
- In office March 29, 2010 – November 6, 2013
- President: Barack Obama
- Preceded by: Christopher Padilla
- Succeeded by: Stefan M. Selig

Personal details
- Born: June 16, 1959 (age 67) Tampa, Florida, U.S.
- Party: Democratic
- Education: Florida State University (BA, JD); Harvard University (MPP)

Francisco J. "Frank" Sánchez (born June 16, 1959) is an American lawyer and business advisor, former Under Secretary of Commerce for International Trade at the Department of Commerce in the Obama administration.

== Early life and education ==
Sánchez graduated with a B.A. from Florida State University in 1982. In 1986, he received a J.D. from Florida State University College of Law. He earned a Master of Public Policy from Harvard University in 1993.

== Professional career ==
From 1984 to 1987, Sánchez worked for then Governor Bob Graham and Lieutenant Governor Wayne Mixson. In 1987 he joined the law firm of Steel, Hector and Davis. In 1993 he went to work for CMI, an international consulting firm focusing on negotiations strategy and conflict management. He then co-founded CMI International Group and served as a senior advisor to CMPartners.

From 1999 to 2000, he served as a Special Assistant to the President. From 2000 to 2001, he served as Assistant Secretary of Transportation for Aviation and International Affairs. In 2001, he founded Cambridge Negotiation Strategies. Sánchez ran for mayor of Tampa, Florida in 2003. In the election, Sánchez came in second after taking it to a runoff.

== Under Secretary of Commerce 2009-2013 ==
On April 20, 2009, President Barack Obama nominated Sánchez to be Under Secretary of Commerce for International Trade. After one and a half years, Sánchez was unanimously confirmed by the U.S. Senate in September 2010.

Sanchez played a leadership role in advancing President Obama's National Export Initiative, to grow exports abroad while creating and supporting American jobs. Under his tenure "22,000 companies realized about $190 billion in U.S. export content, about 96 percent [...] small- and medium-sized companies". The number of these small and medium-size companies that export went up from 257,000 to nearly 300,000, which is a little over 1 percent of American businesses.

Sanchez oversaw the development of U.S. trade policy, promoted U.S. companies in the global economy, strengthened American competitiveness across all industries, addressed market access and compliance issues, and administered U.S. trade laws. Sanchez led international trade missions with multiple U.S companies to emerging markets like China, India, South Korea, Vietnam and Saudi Arabia. He has been an advocate for U.S. businesses during international travel and domestic and international meetings.

Sanchez was appointed by President Obama as one of five senior administration officials to the Congressional-Executive Commission on China from 2011-2012. He has been on the Board of Directors for the Overseas Private Investment Corporation, an "independent" U.S. Government agency that sells investment services assisting U.S. companies abroad.

Sanchez has been a member of the non-profit think tank Council on Foreign Relations. His last day as Undersecretary was November 6, 2013. On November 6, 2013, President Barack Obama nominated former Bank of America chief executive Stefan M. Selig as Sanchez' successor.

== 2014 ==
As of 2014, Sanchez returned to the private sector where he is the Chairman of CNS Global Advisors. In May 2014, Sanchez was elected to the board of Archer Daniels Midland, an American global food-processing and commodities-trading corporation, headquartered in Chicago, Illinois. Sanchez is on the Board of Counselors for McLarty Associates, a Washington-based international business consulting firm, led by Nelson Cunningham, Mack McLarty, John Negroponte., which split off Kissinger Associates in 2008. Sanchez is senior managing director in the leadership team of Pt. Capital, a 2013 private equity firm concentrating on investment in the Arctic, including Alaska, Iceland, Greenland and northern Canada Pan Arctic. He is a non-Resident Fellow at the Brookings Institution, Global Cities Program.

== Awards and recognition ==
- Top 100 Hispanics by Hispanic Business Magazine
- Top Hispanics nationwide by Poder Magazine - "Black Book"
- National Hall of Fame by Boys & Girls Club of America
- Governor's Point of Light Award for Outstanding Community Service
- Recipient of Daily Points of Light Award from the National Points of Light Institute
