= National Stolen Property Act =

- Long title: An act to extend the provisions of the National Motor Vehicle Theft Act to other stolen property.
- Acronyms (colloquial): NSPA
- Enacted by: the 73rd United States Congress
- Effective: May 22, 1934

Citations
- Public law: Pub. L. 73–246

Codification
- U.S.C. sections created: 18 U.S.C. § 2311, §§ 2314–2315

The National Stolen Property Act is an Act of Congress that prohibits the transportation, sale, and receipt of certain illegally obtained property in interstate or international commerce, including stolen goods and forged securities. The definitions for the terms used in the Act are codified at 18 U.S.C. § 2311; the offenses are codified at 18 U.S.C. §§ 2314–2315.

Congress first passed the Act in 1934 to respond to thieves and fences who increasingly exploited channels of interstate commerce to avoid state law enforcement; since then, the Act has been amended multiple times and found applications in many other contexts, including the looting and smuggling of unprovenanced artifacts.

== Provisions ==
=== Definitions ===
Section 2311 of Title 18 provides the definitions for certain words and phrases used in the Act. For example, "money" is defined to include not just the legal tender of the U.S. or any foreign country, but also any counterfeit; "security" receives an expansive definition that also includes, among other things, not just "any instrument commonly known as a 'security,'" but also any forged representation thereof; and "value" is defined as the greatest of the aggregate face, par, or market value of all goods, securities, and money identified in a single indictment.

Separately, both 18 U.S.C. §§ 2314 and 2315 define a "veterans' memorial object" as any grave marker or other monument intended to permanently honor a veteran or an event of national military historical significance.

=== Transportation ===
Section 2314 of Title 18 proscribes six categories of transportation-related conduct. Broadly speaking, paragraphs one and two are concerned with stolen goods; paragraphs three through five with forgery; and paragraph six with veterans' memorial objects. The following table outlines the offenses.

Paragraph	Actus reus	Mens rea	Jurisdictional hook	Monetary threshold	Punishment^{[a]}
1	Transportation of stolen or fraudulently taken goods, securities, or money	Knowledge that the goods etc. were stolen or taken by fraud	The goods etc. were transported in interstate or international commerce	At least $5,000	Fine or imprisonment up to 10 years
2	Transportation of persons in execution or concealment of a pre-devised scheme to defraud said persons of money or property, or inducement of such transportation	Intent to devise such a scheme	The persons were transported or induced to be transported in interstate or international commerce	At least $5,000	Fine or imprisonment up to 10 years
3	Transportation of forged or falsely altered securities or tax stamps	Unlawful or fraudulent intent; knowledge that the securities etc. were forged or falsely altered	The securities etc. were transported in interstate or international commerce	None	Fine or imprisonment up to 10 years
4	Transportation of traveler's checks with forged countersignatures	Unlawful or fraudulent intent	The checks were transported in interstate or international commerce	None	Fine or imprisonment up to 10 years
5	Transportation of tools used or fitted for use in forging or falsely altering securities or tax stamps	Unlawful or fraudulent intent	The tools were transported in interstate or international commerce	None	Fine or imprisonment up to 10 years
6	Transportation of stolen or fraudulently taken veterans' memorial objects	Knowledge that the memorial objects were stolen or taken by fraud	The objects were transported in interstate or international commerce	None^{[b]}	Fine or imprisonment up to 10 years^{[b]}

==== Notes to table ====
a. In general, the punishment for any transportation offense involving a pre-retail medical product, as defined in 18 U.S.C. § 670, shall be the greater of the punishment under this section and the punishment under § 670.

b. But the punishment for the transportation of veterans' memorial objects collectively worth less than $1,000 shall be limited to a fine or imprisonment up to one year.

=== Sale or receipt ===
Section 2315 of Title 18 proscribes five categories of fencing-related conduct. Broadly speaking, paragraph one is concerned with stolen goods; paragraphs two and three with forgery; and paragraph four with veterans' memorial objects. The following table outlines the offenses.

Paragraph	Actus reus	Mens rea	Jurisdictional hook	Monetary threshold	Punishment^{[a]}
1	Receipt, possession, concealment, sale, or disposal of stolen goods, securities, or money	Knowledge that the goods etc. were stolen	The goods etc. crossed a State or U.S. boundary after being stolen	At least $5,000	Fine or imprisonment up to 10 years
1	Pledging or accepting stolen goods, securities, or money as security for a loan	Knowledge that the goods etc. were stolen	The goods etc. crossed a State or U.S. boundary after being stolen	At least $500	Fine or imprisonment up to 10 years
2	Receipt, possession, concealment, sale, or disposal of any forged or falsely altered securities or tax stamps	Knowledge that the securities etc. were forged or falsely altered	The securities etc. form a part of interstate or international commerce	None	Fine or imprisonment up to 10 years
3	Receipt, possession, concealment, sale, or disposal of tools used or intended for use in forging or falsely altering securities or tax stamps	Knowledge that the tools were used or fitted for use in forging or falsely altering securities or tax stamps	The tools were received in interstate or international commerce, or the securities etc. form a part of interstate or international commerce	None	Fine or imprisonment up to 10 years
4	Receipt, possession, concealment, sale, or disposal of veterans' memorial objects	Knowledge that the memorial objects were stolen	The objects crossed a State or U.S. boundary after being stolen	None^{[b]}	Fine or imprisonment up to 10 years^{[b]}

==== Notes to table ====
a. In general, the punishment for any fencing offense involving a pre-retail medical product, as defined in 18 U.S.C. § 670, shall be the greater of the punishment under this section and the punishment under § 670.

b. But the punishment for the receipt, possession, concealment, sale, or disposal of veterans' memorial objects collectively worth less than $1,000 shall be limited to a fine or imprisonment up to one year.

=== Exceptions ===
Both 18 U.S.C. §§ 2314 and 2315 contain provisions that expressly preempt their application to forged or altered bonds or securities issued by the U.S. or any foreign government and to forged or altered bills or bank notes intended to circulate as money in a foreign country. These offenses are usually prosecutable under one of the statutes in Chapter 25 of Title 18 instead.

== Legislative history ==
=== Predecessor ===
The predecessor to the National Stolen Property Act was the National Motor Vehicle Theft Act, which passed Congress in 1919. In essence, this predecessor statute invoked the Commerce Clause to respond to the advent of the automobile and the challenge it presented state law enforcement efforts: for the first time in history, a valuable piece of property, once stolen, could itself be used as the means to flee across state boundaries and thereby escape state jurisdiction.

=== Enactment ===
Fifteen years later, in 1934, Congress expanded the predecessor statute by passing the National Stolen Property Act, with similar intent: in order to detect and punish "[g]angsters who now convey stolen property, except vehicles, across the State line, with that immemorial gesture of derision," Congress decided to no longer limit the provisions of the predecessor statute to motor vehicles; rather, the new Act applied to everything from forged securities to run-of-the-mill goods.

=== Notable amendments ===
Both 18 U.S.C. §§ 2314 and 2315 have been amended multiple times since enactment. The following survey focuses on some of the amendments that either materially affected the implementation of the Act or materially expanded it; it is not meant to be comprehensive.

==== 1986 ====
Congress amended the first paragraph of 18 U.S.C. § 2315 in two ways.

First, the mere possession of stolen properties was added as a proscribed conduct alongside the receipt and concealment of such properties. In criminalizing possession, Congress intended to eliminate the jurisdictional problem that arose where the defendant knowingly possessed stolen properties but could not be shown to have received them in a particular district.

Second, the requirement that the stolen properties formed part of interstate commerce was replaced with the bright-line test of whether they had crossed a state or U.S. boundary. In opting for this bright-line test, Congress intended to eliminate the defense that the stolen properties had left interstate commerce by "coming to rest" or by the passage of time.

==== 2013 ====
Congress added all provisions pertaining to veterans' memorial objects (discussed above) as they now appear in both 18 U.S.C. §§ 2314 and 2315.

== Implementation ==
=== Investigation ===
The investigative jurisdiction for the offenses proscribed under the Act is vested in the Federal Bureau of Investigation.

=== Prosecutorial decision ===
For offenses related to stolen goods (i.e., those proscribed under the first two paragraphs of 18 U.S.C. § 2314 or the first paragraph of § 2315), the Justice Manual directs federal prosecutors to decide whether or not to bring federal charges based on the same factors that are applicable to other non-governmental thefts or frauds. Adjusting the monetary threshold of $5,000 for inflation, the Manual also establishes a general rule of limiting federal prosecution to offenses involving more than $60,000, absent other noteworthy circumstances. It further establishes a general rule of prioritizing the prosecution of fencing over the prosecution of theft, especially where fencing was carried out as part of a legitimate business selling stolen goods to the public.

As for offenses related to forgeries proscribed under 18 U.S.C. §§ 2314 and 2315, the Manual calls for an application of "balanced" judgments that leave prosecution primarily to state prosecutors, unless federal prosecutors need to step in due to the scope of the offenses or the failure of their state counterparts.

In enforcing the Act, the Department of Justice does not currently consider a stolen or fraudulently obtained credit card to be a "security," even though it would arguably be within the expansive definition of "security" under 18 U.S.C. § 2311.

=== Judicial interpretation ===
This subsection summarizes how courts have addressed certain gaps and ambiguities in the text of the Act. It is only intended to answer some of the practical questions that may arise in implementing the Act and is far from being comprehensive.

==== Transportation offenses under 18 U.S.C. § 2314 ====
Courts have interpreted the phrase "goods, wares, and merchandise" broadly, holding that it encompasses all personal properties or chattels as long as they are ordinarily subjects of commerce and have some "tangible existence" (as opposed to intangible properties like digitally stored information).

For the offenses requiring knowledge that a property was stolen, a defendant did not need to know that the stolen property was transported in interstate commerce.

To satisfy the jurisdictional hook, a defendant need only have caused a stolen property to be transported in interstate commerce and need not have personally transported it.

==== Fencing offenses under 18 U.S.C. § 2315 ====
For the purpose of the monetary threshold, the value of a property can be established by its market value either when stolen or at any point while being concealed.

For the offenses requiring knowledge that a property was stolen, the fact-finder is permitted to infer that knowledge from the "unexplained possession of recently stolen property" or from other circumstances that could persuade a "person of ordinary intelligence".

To be convicted of concealing stolen properties, a defendant need only have aided or abetted others in doing so and need not have actually possessed the properties.

== Litigation ==
Litigation is regularly brought under the Act. Among other things, it allows the Department of Justice to combat the smuggling of artifacts that have been looted directly from archaeological or paleontological sites, which cannot be prosecuted like regular theft because there is usually no modern person who has had possession in fact over these artifacts. Once 18 U.S.C. §§ 2314 or 2315 is triggered, the Department can not only press criminal charges against the suspects but also compel the civil forfeiture of the artifacts at issue pursuant to 18 U.S.C. § 981.

The following two examples illustrate how the Act could be invoked in a criminal prosecution involving archaeological artifacts and in a civil forfeiture proceeding involving paleontological artifacts, respectively. As discussed below, they each received much public attention and left behind a legacy that persists to this date. Nevertheless, these are by no means representative of all litigation that has been brought under the Act.

=== United States v. Schultz ===
Frederick Schultz, a prominent art dealer, conspired with several others to smuggle sculptures and other antiques out of Egypt and sell them in the U.S.; as part of the conspiracy, Schultz and his co-conspirators coated some of the antiques in plastic to look like cheap souvenirs and fabricated the "Thomas Alcock Collection" to assign a false provenance to them. While Schultz was indicted and convicted at trial for the conspiracy in violation of 18 U.S.C. § 371, the underlying substantive offense was a violation of 18 U.S.C. § 2315. The prosecution was the subject of public attention, especially in the art world.

On appeal, the Second Circuit, attempting to reconcile U.S. v. McClain, 545 F.2d 988 (5th Cir. 1977), with its own precedents on the Act that were unrelated to looting, held that an artifact is "stolen" within the meaning of the Act if:

- It was unlawfully exported from a foreign nation;
- The foreign nation had enacted patrimony laws that vested the ownership of the artifact in itself; and
- The purpose of the patrimony laws was truly proprietary (i.e., asserting actual ownership over such properties) rather than regulatory (e.g., restricting the exportation of such properties).

Now recognized as the "Schultz doctrine," this formulation has been adopted by the Fifth, Ninth, and Eleventh Circuits as well.

=== United States v. One Tyrannosaurus Bataar Skeleton ===
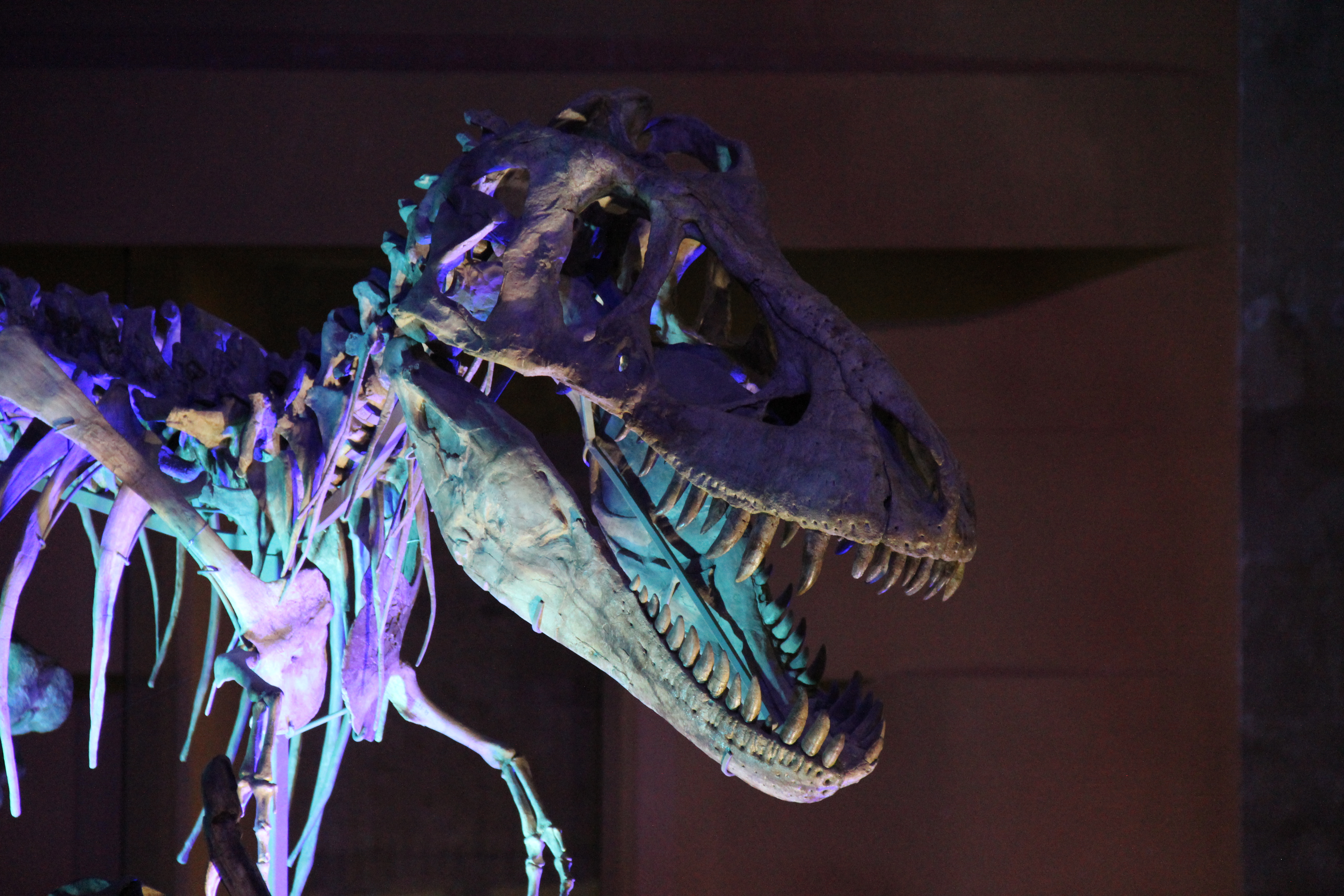
Mounted cast of a Tyrannosaurus bataar fossil in Mongolia; some experts maintain that the species should be named Tarbosaurus bataar instead

Eric Prokopi, a Florida businessman and self-proclaimed "commercial paleontologist," imported the fossilized remains of a Tyrannosaurus bataar from Mongolia into the U.S., allegedly having mislabelled the shipments to clear the customs. He then personally cleaned and assembled the remains and sold it for more than one million U.S. dollars at an auction. Before the transaction closed, however, the affair caught public attention, and President Tsakhia Elbegdorj of Mongolia intervened. Consequently, federal prosecutors charged Prokopi (just like Frederick Schultz, discussed above) with violations of 18 U.S.C. §§ 371 and 2315, to which he eventually pled guilty.

In a parallel civil forfeiture proceeding brought on behalf of the U.S. against the fossil, the S.D.N.Y. denied Prokopi's motion to dismiss after applying the Schultz doctrine to the dispute. With respect to the second and third Schultz elements, the court held that, in the pleading phase, the complaint only needed to allege Mongolian constitutional and statutory provisions that were "on their face" patrimony laws and did not need to establish the proprietary purpose behind them. Prokopi later withdrew his claim to the fossil, and the U.S. obtained a default judgment.

Following the guilty plea and the forfeiture, Prokopi furnished U.S. law enforcement with a trove of information regarding the global black market for fossil trade. To some extent, his cooperation jumpstarted the policing of the fossil trade in the U.S., which was seriously lagging behind, and eventually contributed to the repatriation of this specimen and many others.

== See also ==
- Archaeological Resources Protection Act of 1979
- Convention on Cultural Property Implementation Act
- Native American Graves Protection and Repatriation Act
- Paleontological Resources Preservation Act
