= David Rothkopf =

American political commentator

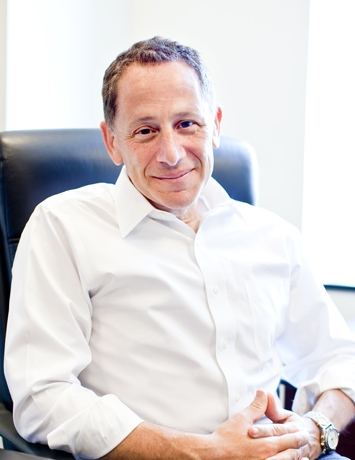
- Rothkopf in 2012
- Born: December 24, 1955 (age 70); Urbana, Illinois, US
- Education: Columbia University; Columbia University Graduate School of Journalism
- Occupations: Journalist, businessman
- Children: 2

David Jochanan Rothkopf (born December 24, 1955) is an American foreign policy, national security and political affairs analyst and commentator. He is the founder and CEO of TRG Media and The Rothkopf Group, a columnist for The Daily Beast and a former member of the USA Today Board of Contributors. He is the author of ten books including Running the World: The Inside Story of the National Security Council and the Architects of American Power, National Insecurity: American Leadership in an Age of Fear, and most recently, Traitor: A History of American Betrayal from Benedict Arnold to Donald Trump. He is also the podcast host of Deep State Radio.

== Early life and education ==
Rothkopf was born in Urbana, Illinois, to a Jewish family. His father escaped the Holocaust while three dozen of his relatives did not. Rothkopf, who grew up in New Jersey, is a 1977 graduate of Columbia College and attended Columbia University Graduate School of Journalism. He has two daughters, Joanna and Laura Rothkopf. He is married to Carla Dirlikov Canales, an opera singer, a US State Department cultural envoy, and a professor of practice at the Fletcher School of Law and Diplomacy at Tufts University.

== Career ==
Rothkopf was a senior executive and editor at Institutional Investor, Inc. and was in a similar capacity at Financial World magazine.

Later, Rothkopf co-founded and was chairman and chief executive of International Media Partners, Inc., which published CEO magazine and Emerging Markets newspaper and organized the CEO Institutes.

In 1993, he joined the Clinton administration as Deputy Under Secretary of Commerce for International Trade Policy and Development. Rothkopf later was Acting U.S. Under Secretary of Commerce for International Trade, directing the 2,400 employees of the International Trade Administration including the U.S. Commercial Service, the International Economic Policy Bureau, the Bureau of Import Administration, and the Bureau of Trade Development.

He left government service and became managing director of Kissinger Associates, the international advisory firm founded and chaired by former U.S. Secretary of State Henry A. Kissinger.

In 1999, he co-founded and was chairman and CEO of Intellibridge Corporation, a provider of international analysis and open-source intelligence for the U.S. national security community and selected investors, financial organizations and other corporations.

He was a visiting scholar at the Carnegie Endowment for International Peace for almost two decades, where he chaired the Carnegie Economic Strategy Roundtable. He was also chairman of the National Strategic Investment Forum Dialogue, a forum convening leading institutional investors for discussions about critical issues of investment strategy. In addition, Rothkopf was a member of the advisory boards of the U.S. Institute of Peace, the Johns Hopkins/Bloomberg School of Public Health, the Center for Global Development, and the Center for the Study of the Presidency.

Later, he co-founded and was president and CEO of Garten Rothkopf, an international advisory firm specializing in transformational global trends, notably those associated with energy, security, and emerging Markets.

In 2012, he was named CEO of the FP Group and editor at large of its Foreign Policy magazine, ForeignPolicy.com, and FP Events. He subsequently became Editor-in-Chief of the company and remained until May 2017.

Following his work at Foreign Policy, Rothkopf founded the Rothkopf Group and TRG Media, which produce a number of podcasts, including Deep State Radio, which is hosted by Rothkopf, as well as Words Matter, Next in Foreign Policy, the DSR Daily Brief and The Secret Life of Cookies. The company also provides podcast and event production services focused on foreign policy, politics, culture, technology, the environment, and women's rights including for companies and for foreign governments such as the United Arab Emirates.

Rothkopf is a member of the Council on Foreign Relations, and has taught international affairs at Columbia University's Graduate School of International and Public Affairs, the Georgetown School of Foreign Service, Johns Hopkins University's Paul H. Nitze School of Advanced International Studies, and he has lectured at leading universities including Harvard, Columbia, Yale, Princeton, Oxford, Cambridge, Stanford, the National Defense University and the Naval War College.

== Bibliography ==
- Running the World: The Inside Story of the National Security Council and the Architects of American Power (2006) (ISBN 1-58648-423-0), which was described by David E. Sanger in The New York Times as "the definitive history of the National Security Council."
- Superclass: The Global Power Elite and the World They Are Making, published in 2008, was described by Rana Foroohar in Time magazine as "perhaps the definitive chronicle of Davos man."
- Power, Inc.: The Epic Rivalry Between Big Business and Government-and the Reckoning That Lies Ahead (ISBN 0-374-53367-9), published in 2012, was well received in the popular press.
- National Insecurity: Making U.S. Foreign Policy in an Age of Fear, 2014.
- The Great Questions of Tomorrow, 2017.
- Traitor: A History of American Betrayal from Benedict Arnold to Donald Trump, 2020.
- American Resistance: The Inside Story of How the Deep State Saved the Nation, 2022.

He is also the author, co-author, co-editor of and contributor to additional books including The Global Century: Globalization and National Security (National Defense University), Cuba: The Contours of Change (Lynne Rienner Publishers), The Price of Peace: Emergency Economic Intervention and U.S. Foreign Policy (Carnegie Endowment for International Peace), The Common Market: Uniting the European Community (Franklin Watts) and The Big Emerging Markets (Bernan Press).
