= Carl Weisbrod =

American civic planner and urban development expert

Director of the New York City Department of City Planning and Chairman of the Planning Commission
- In office February 7, 2014 – March 2017
- Appointed by: Bill de Blasio
- Preceded by: Amanda Burden
- Succeeded by: Marisa Lago

President of the New York City Economic Development Corporation
- In office 1990–1994
- Appointed by: David Dinkins
- Preceded by: Position established
- Succeeded by: Clay Lifflander

Personal details
- Born: 1945 (age 80–81)
- Spouse: Jody Adams
- Education: Cornell University (BS); New York University School of Law (JD)

Carl Weisbrod is an American public sector executive and urban development expert. He is currently a senior advisor to HR&A Advisors and a Senior Fellow at the New York University Marron Institute of Urban Management.

Appointed In 1978 lead the New York City Office of Midtown Enforcement, Weisbrod later moved to economic development roles, most recently serving as Chairman of the New York City Planning Commission and Director of the New York City Department of City Planning.

He is a former member of the Board of the Metropolitan Transportation Authority and was the founding President of the New York City Economic Development Corporation.

Weisbrod has also served as the President of the New York City Downtown Alliance, as an executive vice president of Trinity Church and President of Trinity Real Estate, the $6 billion the real estate development arm of the church. Weisbrod served as one of the chairs of Mayor-elect Bill de Blasio's transition team, as President of the 42nd Street Development Corporation he is credited with the redevelopment of New York City's Times Square area.

Government offices
Preceded by Amanda Burden	Director of the New York City Department of City Planning and Chairman of the Planning Commission; 2014-2017	Succeeded by Marisa Lago
New title	President of the New York City Economic Development Corporation; 1990–1994	Succeeded by Clay Lifflander
