= SelectUSA Investment Summit =

SelectUSA Investment Summit is a U.S. federal government program founded in 2007 that was aimed at promoting foreign direct investment into the United States, facilitating job creation and economic development. It coordinates investment resources across the federal government and through the United States Commercial Service network in over 70 foreign markets. It has a conference that was held by the agency; it is at a federal-level.

It is housed within the Global Markets unit of the Department of Commerce's International Trade Administration, and serves Economic Development Organizations (EDOs) at the state, regional, local, and tribal levels. It also serves business investors with existing operations in the U.S., or planning to enter the U.S. market.

America reinforces the longstanding U.S. Open Investment Policy. Through Invest in America, the Department of Commerce promoted the U.S. economy as an attraction for foreign investment. Since its inception, SelectUSA has facilitated more than $200 billion in investment, creating and retaining over 200,000 U.S. jobs.

== History ==
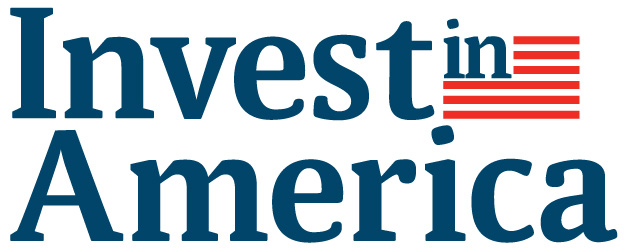
The logo for Invest in America, the predecessor of SelectUSA

=== Invest in America ===
On March 7, 2007, Invest in America was established in the International Trade Administration to promote the United States as a destination for foreign direct investment. Efforts were focused on outreach to foreign governments and investors, support for state governments’ investment promotion efforts, and addressing business climate concerns by serving the international investment community in Washington.

=== SelectUSA ===
In 2011, President Barack Obama established SelectUSA via Executive Order 13577. SelectUSA is headquartered in Washington, D.C., but works with a global network of investment specialists and U.S. Foreign Commercial Service colleagues based in the United States, as well as U.S. embassies and consulates around the globe.

== Services ==
SelectUSA provides the following services:

- Actionable information on business investment in the United States and developing a foreign direct investment strategy. This includes information on the U.S. market, business operations, as well as counseling and customized reports on industry clusters, workforce availability, operating costs, supply chains, infrastructure and logistics, regulations, and federal and state resources for businesses to support companies' decision-making processes.
- A platform for expertise and guidance at the local level, including direct introductions and networking opportunities with U.S. states and EDOs.
- Information on navigating the federal system to help with concerns about U.S. federal rules and regulations.

== Programs ==
- The Federal Interagency Investment Working Group (IIWG) was established to coordinate activities across the many agencies that promote business investment and respond to specific issues that affect investment decisions. The IIWG is composed of 20 federal agencies and associated bureaus, with SelectUSA acting as its chair.
- The U.S. Investment Advisory Council (IAC) advises the Secretary of Commerce on the development and implementation of strategies and programs to attract and retain foreign direct investment in the United States. It consists of 40 members who serve a two-year term. Members include business and economic development leaders representing businesses and organizations.
- SelectUSA Tech connects early-stage and startup technology companies to prospects for advancement in the United States. The program includes one-to-one counseling and customized data, an annual calendar of events, and the Select Global Women in Tech (SGWIT) Program.

== SelectUSA Investment Summit ==
The SelectUSA Investment Summit is the primary event in the United States for foreign direct investment promotion, connecting investors, companies, EDOs, and industry experts to promote U.S. investment. The Investment Summit features plenary sessions, armchair discussions, panels, academies, programs, and an exhibition hall.
