= J. Michael Farren =

American lawyer

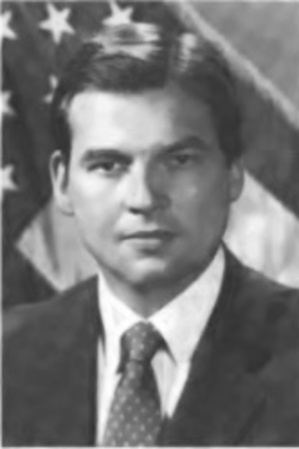

United States Under Secretary of Commerce for International Trade
- In office June 1989 – May 1992
- President: George H. W. Bush
- Secretary: Robert Mosbacher; Rockwell A. Schnabel (acting); Barbara Franklin
- Preceded by: W. Allen Moore
- Succeeded by: Timothy Hauser (acting)

Director of the Office of Business Liaison, United States Department of Commerce
- In office June 1983 – March 1985
- President: Ronald Reagan
- Secretary: Malcolm Baldrige Jr.

Director of the Office of the White House Liaison, United States Department of Commerce
- In office August 1981 – June 1983
- President: Ronald Reagan
- Secretary: Malcolm Baldrige Jr.

Personal details
- Born: John Michael Farren; November 21, 1952 (age 73) Waterbury, Connecticut
- Party: Republican
- Spouse: Mary Margaret Scharf (m. 1997; div. 2011)
- Education: Fairfield University (BA); Trinity College (M.P.P.); University of Connecticut (JD)

John Michael Farren (born November 21, 1952) is a former American lawyer who served as Deputy White House Counsel in the Office of Counsel to the President under the 43rd President of the United States George W. Bush from 2007 to 2009. Farren also served as Under Secretary of Commerce for International Trade at the United States Department of Commerce and head of the International Trade Administration under the 41st President of the United States George H. W. Bush from 1989 to 1992. He is currently serving a 15-year jail sentence for the attempted murder of his then-wife.

== Early life and education ==
Farren is the son of Elizabeth and Joseph Farren of West Hartford, Connecticut. Joseph Farren was the captain of the Naugatuck, Connecticut police department.

In 1977, Farren earned a bachelor's degree from Fairfield University in Fairfield, Connecticut, his master's degree in public policy analysis from Trinity College in Hartford, Connecticut, and in 1982, his J.D. degree from the University of Connecticut School of Law.

== Career ==
=== Pre-political and legal career ===
From 1968 to 1971 he was a sales clerk with Breen's Inc. in Naugatuck, Connecticut. In 1972 and 1973 he was a laborer for the Currier Electric Company in Naugatuck. In 1973 he was a local reporter for the New Haven Register in New Haven, Connecticut.

=== Political career ===
In 1973 he was a campaign coordinator for a mayoral campaign in Connecticut. From 1974 to 1977 he was a campaign director and later district representative for Congressman Ronald Sarasin. From 1977 to 1978 and again from 1978 to 1981 he served as Vice President of the Greater Waterbury Chamber of Commerce. In 1978 he served as a deputy campaign manager for Ronald Sarasin's gubernatorial campaign. From 1981 to 1983 he served as Director of the White House Liaison & Executive Assistant to the Deputy Chairman of the Republican National Committee. From 1983 to 1985 he served as Director of the Office of Business Liaison within the United States Department of Commerce. In 1985 he served as Counselor to the United States Secretary of Commerce. From 1985 to 1988 he served as Deputy Under Secretary of Commerce for the International Trade Administration. In 1988 he served as a consultant to the Deputy Under Secretary of Commerce for the International Trade Administration and later consultant to the Republican National Committee. He also served as counsel to the Wiggin and Dana law firm in its New Haven office, and later consultant to the United States Secretary of Commerce.

Prior to joining the Office of Counsel to the President under President George W. Bush, Farren was corporate vice president, general counsel and corporate secretary at Xerox. From 1989 to 1992, Farren was Under Secretary of Commerce for International Trade at the United States Department of Commerce and head of the International Trade Administration. During the 1988 United States presidential election, he was deputy director of former President George H. Bush’s transition team. During the 1992 United States presidential election he was deputy campaign manager for the Bush-Quayle Re-election Committee.

=== Disbarment ===
On June 25, 2015, Farren was disbarred by the District of Columbia Court of Appeals.

== Personal life ==
=== Marriage ===
Farren married Mary Margaret Scharf, also an attorney, on May 3, 1997. On June 16, 2011, after trial, Mrs. Farren's divorce from Farren was granted.

=== Conviction for attempted murder of wife ===
Farren was arrested on January 6, 2010 and charged with the strangulation, assault in the face with a heavy metal flashlight, and attempted murder of his wife Mary Margaret Farren at their New Canaan, Connecticut home. At the time of his attack on his wife, their two daughters were seven years old and four months old.

After his arrest, Farren spent six months in jail before posting $750,000 bond and checking into a psychiatric facility in Connecticut, according to a Greenwich Time article. After being released from the facility, he was fitted with a tracking device and went to live with his sister in his hometown, West Hartford, Connecticut.

In April 2013, Farren was granted permission to act as his own lawyer and to put forth an insanity defense.

After a five-day Connecticut civil jury trial in December 2013, Farren was ordered by the jury to pay his ex-wife $28.6 million in damages for attempting to kill her. Farren did not defend the suit. The jurors deliberated for only 90 minutes before holding Farren liable.

In July 2014, a jury found Farren guilty of attempted murder, first degree assault, and risk of injury to a child. The judge ordered that he never again have contact with his two daughters. He was represented by counsel in the trial and was later sentenced to 15 years in prison.
