= The Superclass List =

According to David Rothkopf

The Superclass List is a creation of David Rothkopf, which his book Superclass: The Global Power Elite and The World They Are Making (published March 2008) is based upon. Four key elements of success unite the members of the Superclass and give them unparalleled power over world affairs. These elements are: geography, pedigree, networking and luck.

== The verified list ==
In the book, Rothkopf writes that his 2008 list contains 6,000 individuals. The grouping is, however, only defined roughly and as a statistical reality. Rothkopf also writes that the list (one in a million, globally) is always in flux. (Note, world population is now 6.9 – 7 billion. So, if published today, the list may contain 7,000 names.)

Rothkopf states that his list is not to be shown in public, as there will be extensive discussion about who does or does not qualify. In interviews, he mentions individuals who are on the list. This list contains names that he argues he has verified.

=== Australia ===
1. Rupert Murdoch

=== Belgium ===
1. Albert Frère
2. Étienne Davignon
3. Maurice Lippens

=== Brazil ===
1. Luiz Inácio Lula da Silva

=== Chile ===
1. Andronico Luksic

=== China ===
1. Hu Jintao
2. Fu Chengyu
3. Ding Lei
4. Lou Jiwei
5. Yang Huiyan
6. Zhou Xiaochuan
7. Richard Li Tzar Kai

=== Colombia ===
1. Luis Alberto Moreno
2. Shakira
3. Julio Mario Santo Domingo

=== Egypt ===
1. Amr Khaled
2. Amr Moussa

=== Denmark ===
1. Janus Friis

=== France ===
1. Nicolas Sarkozy
2. Pascal Lamy
3. Michèle Alliot-Marie
4. Baudouin Prot
5. Jean-Claude Trichet

=== Germany ===
1. Angela Merkel
2. Josef Ackermann
3. Josef Joffe
4. René Obermann
5. Reinhard Mohn

=== India ===
1. Lakshmi Mittal
2. Sonia Gandhi
3. Ratan Tata
4. Kalanidhi Maran
5. Rana Talwar
6. Kushal Pal Singh
7. Mukesh Ambani
8. Indra Nooyi
9. Tenzin Gyatso

=== Iran ===
1. Shah Reza Pahlavi

=== Ireland ===
1. Bob Geldof

=== Italy ===
1. Silvio Berlusconi

=== Netherlands ===
1. Jeroen van der Veer

=== Japan ===
1. Hiroshi Mikitani
2. Osamu Suzuki
3. Akira Mori

=== Kenya ===
1. Wangari Maathai

=== Kuwait ===
1. Sabah Al-Ahmad Al-Jaber Al-Sabah

=== Lebanon ===
1. Sheikh Hassan Nasrallah

=== Liberia ===
1. Ellen Johnson Sirleaf

=== South Africa ===
1. Patrice Motsepe

=== Mexico ===
1. Mario Molina
2. Genaro Larrea Mota Velasco
3. Guillermo Ortiz Martinez
4. Carlos Slim Helú
5. Joaquín Guzman

=== Nigeria ===
1. Aliko Dangote
2. Odein Ajumogobia
3. Francis Arinze

=== North Korea ===
1. Kim Jong-Un

=== Pakistan ===
1. Humza Bin Masood

=== Qatar ===
1. Sheikh Hamad bin Thamer al-Thani

=== Russia ===
1. Alexei Miller
1. Vladimir Popovkin
2. Andrey Likhachev
3. Oleg Deripaska
4. Sergey Babenkov

=== Saudi Arabia ===
1. Bandar bin Sultan
2. Al-Waleed bin Talal

=== Singapore ===
1. Ho Ching

=== South Africa ===
1. Nelson Mandela (deceased 2013)
2. Patrice Motsepe

Anton Rupert Nicky Oppenheimer Douw Steyn

=== South Korea ===
1. David Yonggi Cho

=== Portugal ===
1. José Manuel Barroso

=== Sweden ===
1. Carl Bildt
2. Marcus Wallenberg
3. Ingvar Kamprad
4. Fredrik Reinfeldt
5. Carl-Henric Svanberg

About 20–30 Swedes are on the list.

=== Switzerland ===
1. Peter Brabeck-Letmathe

=== Turkey ===
1. Kemal Derviş
2. Merve Çatalbaş

=== United Arab Emirates ===
1. Khalifa Mohammad Al-Kindi

=== United Kingdom ===
1. Mike Turner
2. Richard Branson
3. Bernie Ecclestone
4. Lakshmi Mittal
5. John Silvester Varley
6. Mark Thompson

=== United States ===
1. Robert Zoellick
2. Oprah Winfrey
3. Indra Nooyi
4. Al Gore
5. Lee Scott
6. Michael Mullen
7. Mark Zuckerberg
8. Pierre Omidyar
9. Steve Case
10. Sumner Redstone
11. Michael Bloomberg
12. Rex Tillerson
13. Ben Bernanke
14. Ken Lewis
15. Stephen Green (banker)
16. Lloyd Blankfein
17. Sergey Brin
18. Larry Page
19. Bill Gates
20. Warren Buffett
21. Jerry Yang
22. Henry "Hank" Paulson
23. Joshua Bolten

=== Vatican ===
1. Pope Benedict XVI

=== Venezuela ===
1. Lorenzo Mendoza Gimenez
2. Gustavo Cisneros
