= Christopher A. Padilla =

American under secretary

Chris Padilla
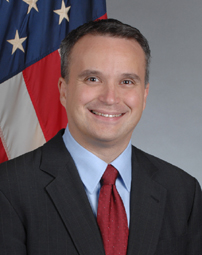

Under Secretary of Commerce for International Trade
- In office December 19, 2007 – January 20, 2009
- President: George W. Bush
- Preceded by: Michelle O'Neill (Acting)
- Succeeded by: Frank Sanchez

Christopher A. "Chris" Padilla is a former Under Secretary for International Trade within the United States Department of Commerce. From 2002-2008, Christopher Padilla worked within the Bush administration with a focus on international trade and economic issues. On September 29, 2006, he was confirmed as Assistant Secretary of Commerce for Export Administration by the U.S. Senate.

== Footnotes ==
Political offices
Preceded by Michelle O'Neill; Acting	Under Secretary of Commerce for International Trade; 2007–2009	Succeeded by Frank Sanchez
