= Ancient Coin Collectors Guild =

U.S. non-profit organization

- Founded: July 15, 2004; 22 years ago
- Type: Non-profit advocacy group
- Registration no.: N00599173 (Missouri)
- Location: Gainesville, Missouri
- Key people: Peter K. Tompa, Executive Director
- Website: accg.us

Ancient Coin Collectors Guild was founded in 2004 as an advocacy group for dealers and collectors of ancient coins. The ACCG is a 501(c)(4) non-profit organization chartered in the American state of Missouri.

== Mission ==
According to its bylaws, the purpose of the Ancient Coin Collectors Guild is to promote and nurture the free and independent collecting of coins from antiquity. This is undertaken by volunteers through education, political action, and consumer protection. The goal of the ACCG is to foster an environment in which the general public is able to confidently and legally acquire and hold, for personal or professional use, any numismatic item of historical interest regardless of date or place of origin.

== Governance ==
The ACCG is governed by an elected board of seven Directors. Daily business of the guild is managed by an Executive Director. The guild has no paid employees. Membership categories range from Friend to Benefactor with varying levels of contribution distinguishing the membership level. The ACCG is an umbrella organization for 24 Affiliate Member organizations boasting a total membership of nearly 6,000 collectors.

== Activities ==
Activities of the ACCG have mainly been directed toward legislative or governmental agency lobbying and educational programs related to cultural property management or youth programs. For example, the ACCG opposes any changes to the Memorandum of Understanding that the State Department's Cultural Property Advisory Committee has with Italy, that would mean ancient coins no longer have unrestricted entry into the United States.

=== 2010 federal lawsuit ===
In July 2010, the ACCG filed a lawsuit in the United States District Court for the District of Maryland against U.S. Customs and Border Protection (CBP). The lawsuit sought to recover 23 ancient Cypriot and Chinese coins that the ACCG had ordered from a coin dealer in London and which were seized by CBP in Baltimore in 2009. In 2011, the district court dismissed the lawsuit. The ACCG appealed, and in 2012 the U.S. Court of Appeals for the Fourth Circuit affirmed the district court's decision to dismiss the case.
