= Subclass =

Subclass may refer to:

- Subclass (taxonomy), a taxonomic rank below "class"
- Subclass (computer science)
- Subclass (set theory)
- Subclass (knowledge representation)

== See also ==
- Superclass
