= Marisa Lago =

American attorney and government official (born 1955)

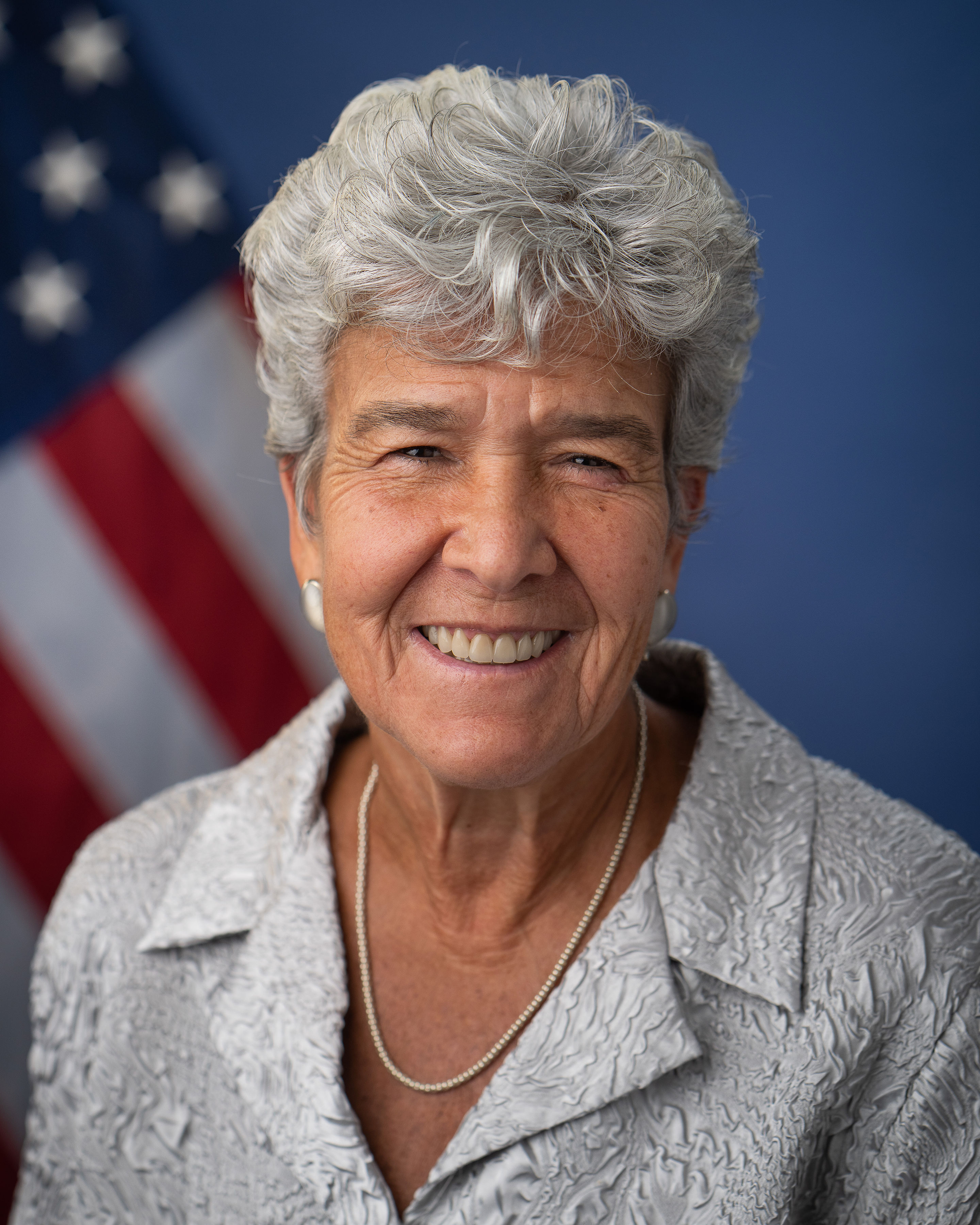

Under Secretary of Commerce for International Trade
- In office December 28, 2021 – January 20, 2025
- President: Joe Biden
- Preceded by: Gilbert B. Kaplan
- Succeeded by: William Kimmitt

Director of the New York City Department of City Planning
- In office March 2017 – December 28, 2021
- Mayor: Bill de Blasio
- Preceded by: Carl Weisbrod
- Succeeded by: Anita Laremont

United States Director of the European Bank for Reconstruction and Development
- In office December 2013 – November 2015; Acting
- President: Barack Obama
- Preceded by: James Hudson
- Succeeded by: Scott Allen

Assistant Secretary of the Treasury for International Markets
- In office February 2010 – January 2017
- President: Barack Obama
- Preceded by: Neel Kashkari
- Succeeded by: Heath Tarbert

President and CEO of the Empire State Development Corporation
- In office September 2008 – June 2009
- Governor: David Paterson
- Preceded by: Avi Schick
- Succeeded by: Dennis Mullen

Personal details
- Born: Maria Louise Lago; December 4, 1955 (age 70) New York City, New York, U.S.
- Party: Democratic
- Education: Cooper Union (BS); Brown University; Harvard University (JD)

Marisa Lago (born December 4, 1955) is an American attorney who served as the Under Secretary of Commerce for International Trade from 2021 to 2025. She previously served as director of the New York City Department of City Planning and chair of the City Planning Commission from 2017 to 2021. Before that, Lago served as assistant secretary for international markets and development in the United States Department of the Treasury from 2010 to 2017, and as president and chief executive officer of the Empire State Development Corporation from 2008 to 2009.

== Early life and education ==
Born in Brooklyn, Lago is a 1973 graduate of Morris Catholic High School in Denville Township, New Jersey. She received a Bachelor of Science degree in physics from the Cooper Union in 1977 and then studied applied mathematics at Brown University for one semester. Lago earned a Juris Doctor from Harvard Law School in 1982.

== Career ==
After completing law school, Lago spent one year as a law clerk for U.S. Circuit Judge Hugh H. Bownes in Concord, New Hampshire.

From February 1994 to January 1997, Lago served as director and chief economic development officer for the Boston Redevelopment Authority in Massachusetts.

In August 2008, Lago was nominated by New York governor David Paterson to serve as president and CEO of the Empire State Development Corporation. After confirmation by the New York State Senate, she served until June 2009 and then continued to work as an advisor to the corporation until joining the Obama administration in February 2010.

=== Obama Administration ===
In September 2009, President Barack Obama nominated Lago to serve as assistant secretary for international markets and development. She appeared before the Senate Committee on Banking, Housing, and Urban Affairs in November 2009 and was confirmed by voice vote of the full Senate in February 2010.

After the resignation of James LaGarde Hudson, Lago also served as acting U.S. director of the European Bank for Reconstruction and Development from December 2013 until the confirmation of Scott Ames Allen in November 2015.

In November 2014, President Obama nominated Lago to be a deputy trade representative with the rank of ambassador and nominated Wally Adeyemo to replace her as assistant secretary of the treasury. She appeared before the Senate Committee on Finance in July 2015 and the committee advanced her nomination to the full Senate in August. Adeyemo's nomination was withdrawn in December 2015 and no further action was taken on Lago's nomination before the end of the Obama administration in January 2017.

=== New York City Government ===
In January 2017, New York City mayor Bill de Blasio announced that Lago would succeed Carl Weisbrod as director of the Department of City Planning and chair of the City Planning Commission.

=== Biden Administration ===
In September 2021, President Joe Biden nominated Lago to be the next under secretary of commerce for international trade. The United States Senate confirmed her on December 16, 2021, by voice vote, and she was sworn in on December 28, 2021.

Lago was part of a Biden administration effort in April 2022 to help repair the United States' "strained relations" with Turkey, Axios reported. Lago traveled to Turkey to promote clean energy efforts in the region.
