= Title 19 of the Code of Federal Regulations =

U.S. federal rules and regulations on customs duties

CFR Title 19 – Customs Duties is one of fifty titles comprising the United States Code of Federal Regulations (CFR), containing the principal set of rules and regulations issued by federal agencies regarding customs duties. It is available in digital and printed form, and can be referenced online using the Electronic Code of Federal Regulations (e-CFR).

== Structure ==
The table of contents, as reflected in the e-CFR updated March 4, 2014, is as follows:

Volume	Chapter	Parts	Regulatory Entity
1	I	0-140	U.S. Customs and Border Protection, Department of Homeland Security; Department of the Treasury
2		141-199	U.S. Customs and Border Protection, Department of Homeland Security; Department of the Treasury
3	II	200-299	United States International Trade Commission
	III	300-399	International Trade Administration, Department of Commerce
	IV	400-599 [Reserved]	U.S. Immigration and Customs Enforcement, Department of Homeland Security

== See also ==
- Customs ruling
