= Superclass (book) =

2008 book by David Rothkopf

- Author: David Rothkopf
- Language: English
- Genre: Politics, Globalization, Global governance
- Published: 2008 Farrar, Straus and Giroux (U.S.); 2008 Little, Brown (UK)
- Publication place: United States
- Media type: Print (Hardback & Paperback) and audiobook
- Pages: 376 p. (US hardback edition) & 400 p. (UK hardback edition)
- ISBN: 0-374-27210-7 (US hardback edition), ISBN 1-4087-0109-X (UK hardback edition)
- OCLC: 166378239
- Dewey Decimal: 305.5/2 22
- LC Class: HM1263 .R68 2008
- Preceded by: Running the World
- Followed by: ...

Superclass: The Global Power Elite and the World They Are Making is a book about global governance by American author David Rothkopf, released in March 2008 by publisher Farrar, Straus and Giroux. The book claims that the world's population of 6 billion people is subject to the immense influence of an elite (i.e., The Superclass) of 6,000 individuals.

Until the late 20th century, governments of the great powers provided most of the superclass, accompanied by a few heads of international movements (i.e., the Pope of the Roman Catholic Church) and entrepreneurs (Rothschilds, Rockefellers). According to Rothkopf, in the early 21st century, economic clout—fueled by the explosive expansion of international trade, travel, and communication—rules. Further, the nation-state's power has diminished, shrinking politicians to minority power broker status. Leaders in international business, finance, and the defense industry not only dominate the superclass, but they also move freely into high positions in their nations' governments and back to private life largely beyond the notice of elected legislatures (including the U.S. Congress), which remain abysmally ignorant of affairs beyond their borders. He proposes that the superclass's disproportionate influence over national policy is constructive but always self-interested, and that around the world, few object to corruption and oppressive governments, provided they can do business in these countries.

== See also ==
- The Superclass List
