= Grant D. Aldonas =

American politician

Under Secretary of Commerce for International Trade
- In office 2001–2005
- President: George W. Bush
- Preceded by: Timothy Hauser (Acting)
- Succeeded by: Rhonda Keenum (Acting)

Personal details
- Occupation: Attorney

Grant D. Aldonas is an American attorney who served as Under Secretary of Commerce for International Trade during the presidency of George W. Bush. He also served as an advisor to Mitt Romney during his 2012 presidential campaign. Aldonas graduated from the University of Minnesota with a degree in international relations and received a Juris Doctor from the same school.
