= United States Committee of the International Council on Monuments and Sites =

United States Committee of the International Council on Monuments and Sites (ICOMOS-USA) is one of numerous national subsidiary committees of ICOMOS, forming a worldwide alliance for the study and conservation of historic buildings, districts, and sites. It is the center for international cultural resources exchange in the United States, working to share preservation information and expertise globally. It also showcases and explains the unique American preservation system, which involves partnerships between private organizations and federal, state, and local governments, as well as collaboration among the academic community, professionals, and civic volunteers.

ICOMOS-USA is one of the largest national committees of ICOMOS, comprising over 500 members in the United States and abroad. As the primary preservation organization with a global focus in the United States, ICOMOS-USA serves as the principle gateway for the participation of U.S. preservation professionals in worldwide heritage conservation. The organization guides and promotes activities through an extensive membership network of preservation professionals, institutions, and organizations, including specialized scientific committees. ICOMOS-USA also organizes an annual international scientific symposium, an International Intern Exchange Program, and occasional special training courses and workshops.

ICOMOS-USA is supported by World Heritage USA, which raises funds and organizes and carries out activities and programs on behalf of ICOMOS-USA. Learn more about ICOMOS-USA at www.ICOMOS-USA.org and about World Heritage USA at www.WorldHeritageUSA.org.

== See also ==
- Historic Preservation
- ICOMOS
- List of World Heritage Sites in the Americas
