= United States Commercial Service =

Agency of the International Trade Administration

Agency overview
- Parent agency: International Trade Administration
- Website: www.trade.gov/us-commercial-service

The United States Commercial Service is an agency of the International Trade Administration under the United States Department of Commerce that assists United States businesses with exports and sales in foreign markets. Commercial Officers in the Commercial Service are Foreign Service officers in the United States Foreign Service.

== See also ==
- International Trade Commission
- Office of the United States Trade Representative
