= International Trade Administration =

Agency in the US Commerce Department

Agency overview
- Headquarters: Herbert C. Hoover Building 1401 Constitution Avenue NW Washington, D.C., U.S.
- Employees: 1,966 (2013)
- Annual budget: $497 million (2015)
- Agency executive: William Kimmitt, Under Secretary for International Trade
- Parent agency: Department of Commerce
- Child agency: United States Commercial Service
- Website: trade.gov

The International Trade Administration (ITA) is an agency in the United States Department of Commerce that promotes United States exports of nonagricultural U.S. goods and services.

== Duties ==
The ITA's stated goals are to

1. Provide practical information to help Americans select markets and products.
2. Ensure that Americans have access to international markets as required by the U.S. trade agreements.
3. Safeguard Americans from unfair competition from dumped and subsidized imports.

== Organization ==
ITA consists of three sub-units. These are: Industry and Analysis (I&A), Global Markets (GM), and Enforcement and Compliance (E&C).

- Under Secretary of Commerce for International Trade
  - Deputy Under Secretary of Commerce for International Trade
  - Assistant Secretary of Commerce for Global Markets and Director General of the U.S. Commercial Service
    - Office of Strategic Planning
    - Deputy Director General of the U.S. Commercial Service
      - Office of Foreign Service and Human Capital
      - Office of Budget
      - Business Information Technology Office
      - Office of Administrative Services
    - Deputy Assistant Secretary for Global Markets
      - Global Knowledge Center
      - SelectUSA
    - Office of Domestic Operations
    - Office of China
    - Office of Europe, the Middle East, and Africa
    - Office of Asia
    - Office of the Western Hemisphere
    - Advocacy Center
  - Assistant Secretary of Commerce for Industry and Analysis
    - Office of Manufacturing
      - Office of Transportation and Machinery
      - Office of Energy and Environment
      - Office of Health & Information Technology
    - Office of Services
      - Office of Finance & Insurance Industries
      - Office of Digital Services Industries
      - Office of Supply Chain, Professional, & Business Services
    - Office of Trade Policy and Analysis
      - Office of Trade & Economic Analysis
      - Office of Trade Negotiations & Analysis
      - Office of Standards & Investment Policy
      - Office of Intellectual Property Rights
    - Office of Textiles, Consumer Goods, and Materials
      - Office of Consumer Goods
      - Office of Textiles & Apparel
      - Office of Materials Industries
    - National Travel and Tourism Office
      - Office of Travel and Tourism Industries
    - Office of Advisory Committees and Industry Outreach
    - Office of Trade Programs and Strategic Partnerships
    - Office of Planning, Coordination, and Management
    - Trade Agreement Secretariat
  - Assistant Secretary of Commerce for Enforcement and Compliance
    - Office of Anti-Dumping and Countervailing Duties Operations
    - Office of Policy and Negotiations

The U.S. Commercial Service, through its Strategic Corporate Partnership program, has Public Private Partnership agreements with 17 private organizations, including several banks, legal and regulatory organizations, transportation and shipping organizations, event organizers, trade risk service companies and the publisher of Commercial News USA, the official export promotion magazine of the U.S. Department of Commerce, The ecommerce partner is the Federation of International Trade Associations under which the USCS contributes market research and other reports on GlobalTrade.net.

== See also ==
- Agreement on Trade-Related Aspects of Intellectual Property Rights
- Bureau of Industry and Security
- Doha Round
- Generalized System of Preferences
- Title 15 of the Code of Federal Regulations
- Title 19 of the Code of Federal Regulations
- International Trade Commission
- Office of the United States Trade Representative
- United States Commercial Service
- United States Trade Representative
- World Trade Organization
