= Commission on Security and Cooperation in Europe =

Independent U.S. government agency

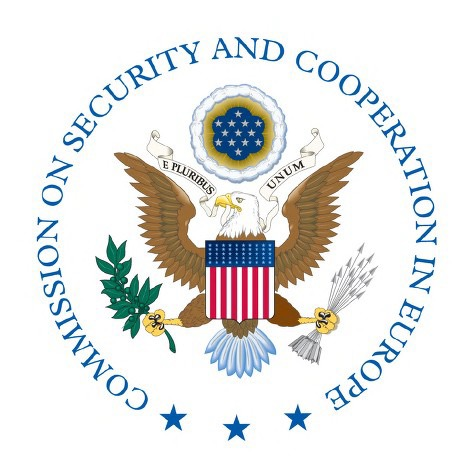

Agency overview
- Formed: June 3, 1976; 50 years ago
- Headquarters: Ford House Office Building; 38°53′4.2″N 77°0′51.84″W
- Parent agency: United States Congress
- Website: www.csce.gov/issue/helsinki-commission

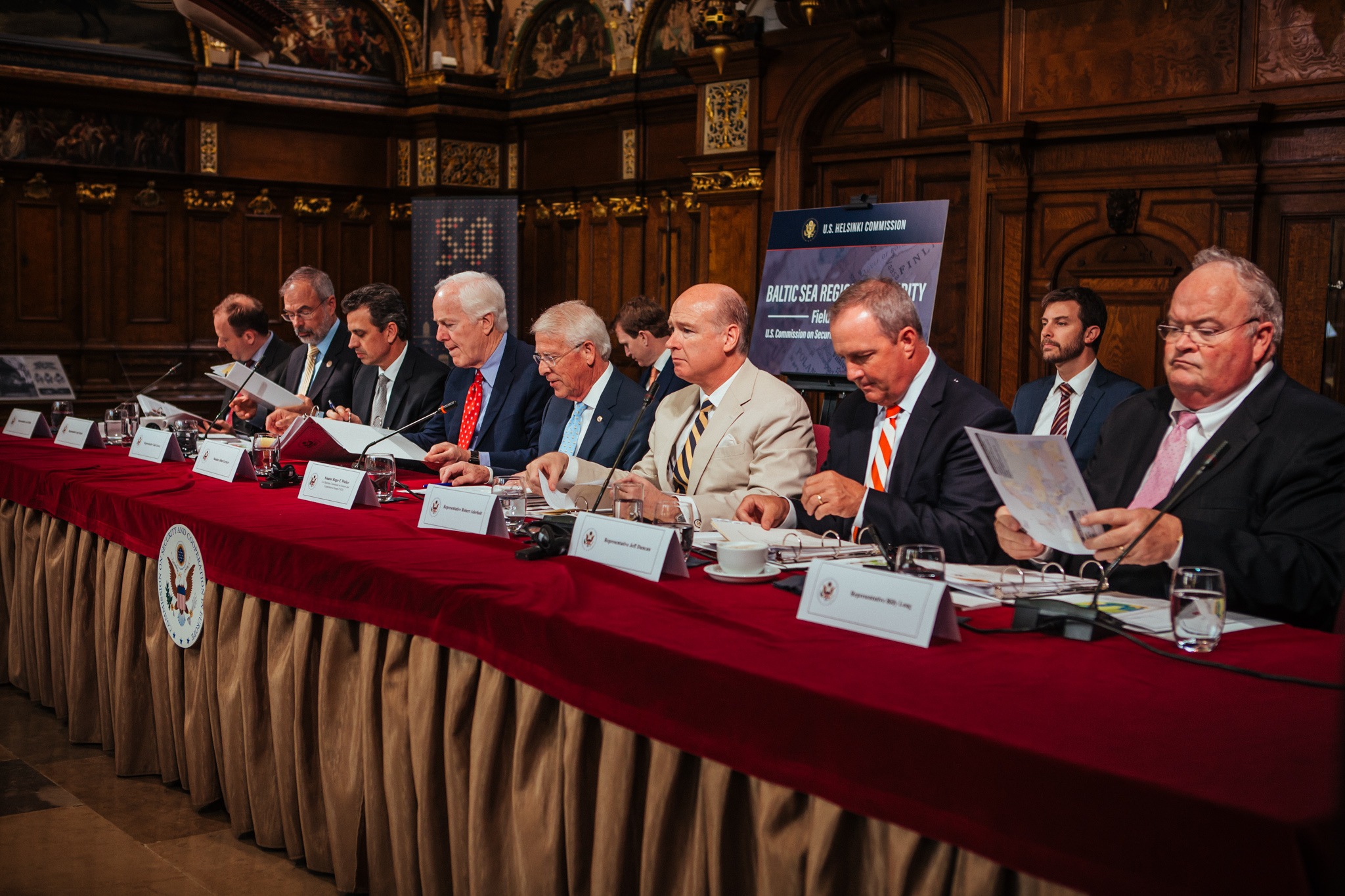
The US Helsinki Commission at a hearing about Baltic Sea security in July 2019.

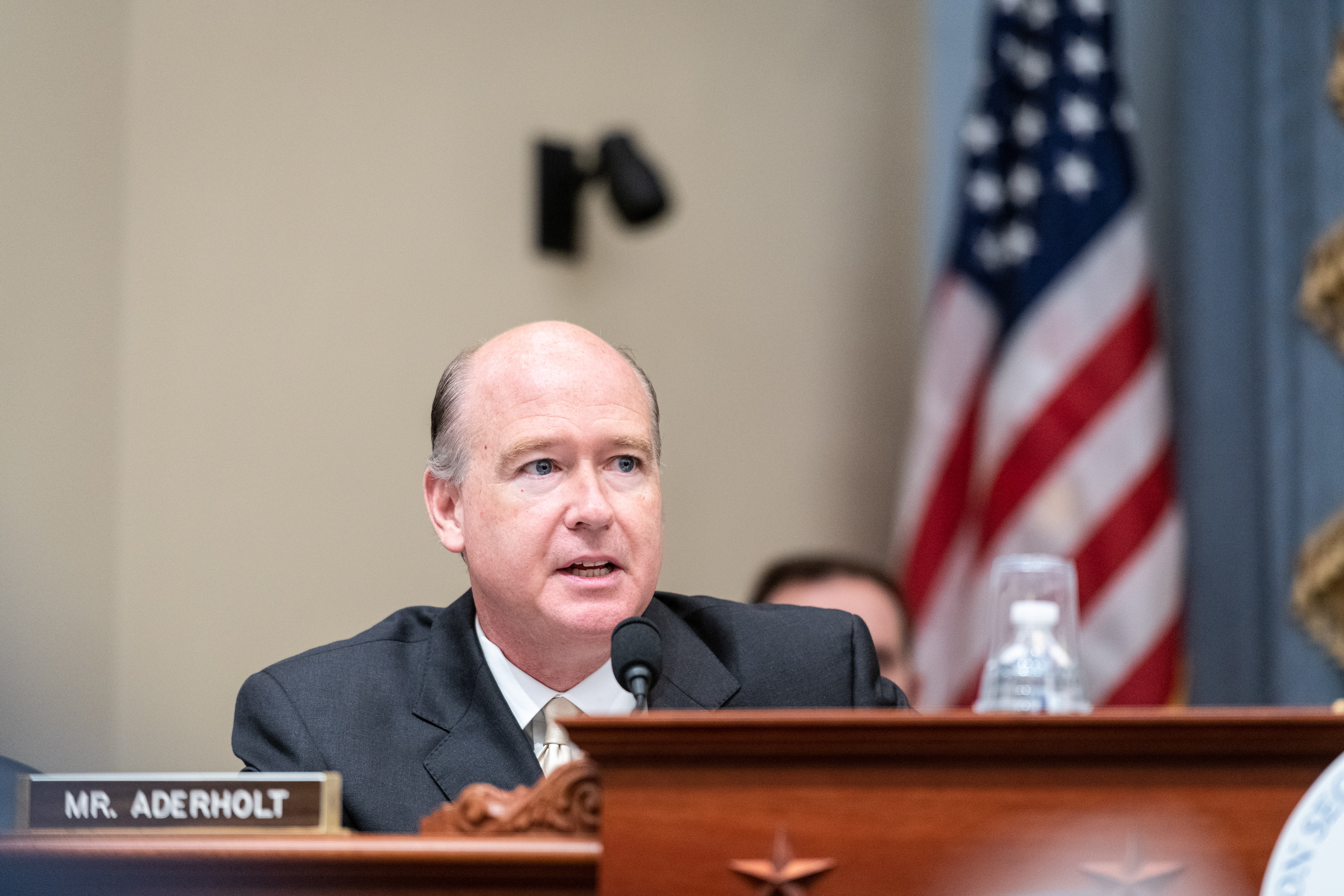
Congressman Robert Aderholt during a Commission meeting in October 2019.

The Commission on Security and Cooperation in Europe (CSCE), also known as the U.S. Helsinki Commission, is an independent U.S. government commission created by Congress in 1976. The commission was established to monitor and encourage compliance with the Helsinki Final Act, an agreement between the United States, Canada, Russia and all of Europe except Albania. It was later institutionalized as the Organization for Security and Cooperation in Europe (OSCE) in 1995. Representative Millicent Fenwick was a fierce advocator of the commission and advocated for a U.S. body to promote compliance with the commitments of the Helsinki Final Act, alongside Senator Clifford Case. The commission was signed into law by President Ford in 1976.

== Function and duties of Commission ==
The Commission is authorized and directed to monitor the acts of the signatories which reflect compliance with or violation of the articles of the Final Act of the Conference on Security and Cooperation in Europe, with “particular regard to the provisions relating to human rights and Cooperation in Humanitarian Fields.” The Final Act is a politically binding agreement covering a range of measures designed to enhance security and cooperation in the detailed region. The Final Act contains ten guiding principles for interstate relations which the Commission encourages member states to uphold. The Commission primarily focuses on promoting human rights and freedoms within participating states. The mandate extends to all participating states, but the Commission pays particular attention to Russia, Eastern Europe, the Caucasus, and Central Asia. The Commission’s focus has expanded to partner states and beyond as the OSCE has expanded and member states face challenges posed from outside of the region. The Commission is currently primarily focused on Ukraine and holding Russia accountable for upholding the commitments of the OSCE.

== Abstract ==
The Commission consists of nine members from the U.S. House of Representatives, nine members from the United States Senate. The Commission also has one member each from the Departments of State, Defense, and Commerce, who are appointed by the President. The positions of chair and co-chair are shared by the House and Senate and rotate every two years, when a new Congress convenes. A professional staff assists the Commissioners in their work.

The Commission contributes to the formulation of U.S. policy toward the Organization for Security and Co-operation in Europe (OSCE) and the participating states and takes part in its execution, including through Member and staff participation on official U.S. delegations to OSCE meetings and in certain OSCE bodies. Members of the Commission have regular contact with parliamentarians, government officials, NGOs, and private individuals from other OSCE participating states. The Commission brings awareness to violations of the Helsinki Final Act, particularly violations of humanitarian commitments in member and partner states.

The Commission convenes public hearings and briefings with expert witnesses on OSCE-related issues; hosts a podcast with guests related to freedom and security across the OSCE region; issues public reports concerning implementation of OSCE commitments in participating states; releases statements from Commission members; and organizes official delegations to participating states and OSCE meetings to address and assess democratic, economic, and human rights developments firsthand.

== History ==
The Helsinki Final Act was signed in August 1975 by the heads of state or government of 35 countries across Europe and including the Soviet Union, the United States and Canada. The Final Act was adopted by consensus, making commitments less ambitious, but with greater accountability as governments freely accepted all commitments. The Final Act is divided into three chapters, known as ‘buckets’. The first deals with security concerns, the second with economic concerns and the final with humanitarian concerns. President Ford signed the Helsinki Final Act in 1975 and the U.S. Commission on Security and Cooperation, known as the U.S. Helsinki Commission, was authorized shortly after under Public Law 94-304 of June 3, 1976. The Commission is mandated to monitor acts of signatories to the Helsinki Final Act and ensure compliance among participating states.

The Commission originally had 15 members, with 12 members of Congress and three executive representatives. The legislation was amended in 1979 to expand the Commission to 18 members of Congress and three representatives from the executive Departments of State, Defense and Commerce. The Commission is bicameral; there are five representatives from the majority and four from the minority from both the House and Senate.

The Commission focuses on promoting human rights and fundamental freedoms within and relating to the OSCE member and partner states. The Commission specifically focuses on states where persistent violations of Helsinki Final Act commitments occur, which has traditionally been Russia, Eastern and Central Europe, the Caucasus, and Central Asia. Although the Helsinki Commission does not have enforcement power, the Commission monitors and encourages compliance with the Final Act and ensures that compliance with Helsinki Provisions are given due consideration in Congress.

The United States has the largest presence at the OSCE Parliamentary Assembly, with 17 of the 323 parliamentarians being American. As such, the U.S. has continuously been a leader within the OSCE. At the 1977 Belgrade Review Meeting of the OSCE, Helsinki Commission participants articulated specific violations of the Helsinki Accords by the Soviet Union. The Soviet Union then criticized the U.S. for racism and poverty, which the U.S. then investigated and reported factually on, setting a precedent for accountability among member states.

The U.S. Helsinki Commission was the first to propose concrete commitments to free and fair elections among OSCE members in 1989; these commitments were adopted in 1990. Since then, Helsinki Commissioners and staff have observed over 100 elections. The U.S. Helsinki Commission continues to support OSCE’s observation of domestic elections, focusing on states where there is resistance to democratic change.

The U.S. Helsinki Commission continued to monitor compliance with the Accords throughout the 1990s and 2000s. The Sergei Magnitsky Rule of Law Accountability Act was signed into law in 2012 in response to the murder of Russian tax lawyer Sergei Magnitsky after he uncovered the theft of $230 million by corrupt Russian officials. This act specifically targeted human rights abuses in the Russian Federation through punitive sanctions and continues to serve as a foundation for fighting corruption within the Russian Federation. “Magnitsky-like” legislation has since been passed in Australia, Canada, the European Union and the United Kingdom.

Since the Russian invasion of Ukraine in 2022, the Commission has focused on calling for Russian accountability and protecting the rights and freedoms of those affected by the War in Ukraine. The Commission Chairman, Co-Chairman and Ranking Members immediately released a statement condemning the actions of Russia following the large-scale invasion of Ukraine on February 24, 2022. Since then, the Commission has hosted many hearings surrounding Russian aggression and brought in experts to discuss the implications of Russia’s war in Ukraine and consistent violation of Helsinki Final Act commitments. Commissioners have sponsored multiple pieces of legislation relating to the war and limiting Russian resources while supporting Ukrainian efforts; these include the Combatting Global Corruption Act and the Ukraine Religious Freedom Support Act among others. The Commission continues to promote Helsinki Final Act commitments among all member and partner states, including the United States.

== Current commissioners, 119th Congress ==
	Majority	Minority
Senate members	Roger Wicker, Mississippi, Chair; John Boozman, Arkansas; Thom Tillis, North Carolina; Katie Britt, Alabama; Mike Rounds, South Dakota	Sheldon Whitehouse, Rhode Island, Ranking Member; Jeanne Shaheen, New Hampshire; Tina Smith, Minnesota; John Fetterman, Pennsylvania; Ruben Gallego, Arizona
House members	Joe Wilson, South Carolina, Co-Chair; Robert Aderholt, Alabama; Richard Hudson, North Carolina; Greg Murphy, North Carolina; Jake Ellzey, Texas	Steve Cohen, Tennessee, Ranking Member; Emanuel Cleaver, Missouri; Marc Veasey, Texas; Lloyd Doggett, Texas
Executive branch	Vacant, Department of Commerce; Vacant, Department of Defense; Vacant, Department of State	

Historical membership

Commissioners, 118th Congress

	Majority	Minority
Senate members	Ben Cardin, Maryland, Co-Chair; Richard Blumenthal, Connecticut; Jeanne Shaheen, New Hampshire; Tina Smith, Minnesota; Sheldon Whitehouse, Rhode Island	Roger Wicker, Mississippi, Ranking Member; John Boozman, Arkansas; Tim Scott, South Carolina; Thom Tillis, North Carolina
House members	Joe Wilson, South Carolina, Chair; Robert Aderholt, Alabama; Richard Hudson, North Carolina; Mike Lawler, New York; Victoria Spartz, Indiana	Steve Cohen, Tennessee, Vice Ranking Member; Emanuel Cleaver, Missouri; Ruben Gallego, Arizona; Marc Veasey, Texas
Executive branch	Don Graves, Department of Commerce; Celeste Wallander, Department of Defense; Erin Barclay, Department of State (until January 22, 2024); Dafna Rand (from August 8, 2024)	

Commissioners, 117th Congress

	Majority	Minority
Senate members	Ben Cardin, Maryland, Chair; Jeanne Shaheen, New Hampshire; Sheldon Whitehouse, Rhode Island; Dick Blumenthal, Connecticut; Tina Smith, Minnesota	Roger Wicker, Mississippi, Vice Ranking Member; John Boozman, Arkansas; Marco Rubio, Florida; Thom Tillis, North Carolina
House members	Alcee Hastings, Florida, Co-Chair (until April 6, 2021); Steve Cohen, Tennessee, Co-Chair (from July 1, 2021); Gwen Moore, Wisconsin; Emanuel Cleaver, Missouri; Marc Veasey, Texas; Ruben Gallego, Arizona	Joe Wilson, South Carolina, Ranking Member; Robert Aderholt, Alabama; Brian Fitzpatrick, Pennsylvania; Richard Hudson, North Carolina
Executive branch	Vacant, Department of Commerce; Vacant, Department of Defense; Vacant, Department of State	

Commissioners, 116th Congress

	Majority	Minority
Senate members	Roger Wicker, Mississippi, Co-Chair; John Boozman, Arkansas; Cory Gardner, Colorado; Marco Rubio, Florida; Thom Tillis, North Carolina	Ben Cardin, Maryland, Ranking Member; Jeanne Shaheen, New Hampshire; Tom Udall, New Mexico; Sheldon Whitehouse, Rhode Island
House members	Alcee Hastings, Florida, Chair; Steve Cohen, Tennessee; Gwen Moore, Wisconsin; Emanuel Cleaver, Missouri; Marc Veasey, Texas	Joe Wilson, South Carolina, Vice Ranking Member; Robert Aderholt, Alabama; Brian Fitzpatrick, Pennsylvania; Richard Hudson, North Carolina
Executive branch	Vacant, Department of Commerce; Vacant, Department of Defense; Vacant, Department of State	

Commissioners, 115th Congress

	Majority	Minority
Senate members	Roger Wicker, Mississippi, Chair; John Boozman, Arkansas; Cory Gardner, Colorado; Marco Rubio, Florida; Thom Tillis, North Carolina	Ben Cardin, Maryland, Vice Ranking Member; Jeanne Shaheen, New Hampshire; Tom Udall, New Mexico; Sheldon Whitehouse, Rhode Island
House members	Chris Smith, New Jersey, Co-Chair; Robert Aderholt, Alabama; Michael Burgess, Texas; Randy Hultgren, Illinois; Richard Hudson, North Carolina	Alcee Hastings, Florida, Ranking Member; Steve Cohen, Tennessee; Sheila Jackson Lee, Texas; Gwen Moore, Wisconsin
Executive Branch	Vacant, Department of Commerce; Vacant, Department of Defense; Vacant, Department of State	

Commissioners, 114th Congress

	Majority	Minority
Senate members	Roger Wicker, Mississippi, Co-Chair; John Boozman, Arkansas; Richard Burr, North Carolina; 2 vacant	Ben Cardin, Maryland, Ranking Member; Jeanne Shaheen, New Hampshire; Tom Udall, New Mexico; Sheldon Whitehouse, Rhode Island
House members	Chris Smith, New Jersey, Chair; Robert Aderholt, Alabama; Michael Burgess, Texas; Randy Hultgren, Illinois; Joe Pitts, Pennsylvania	Alcee Hastings, Florida, Vice Ranking Member; Steve Cohen, Tennessee; Alan Grayson, Florida; Louise Slaughter, New York
Executive Branch	Arun Kumar, Department of Commerce; Elissa Slotkin, Department of Defense; Vacant, Department of State	

Commissioners, 113th Congress

	Majority	Minority
Senate members	Ben Cardin, Maryland, Chair; Sheldon Whitehouse, Rhode Island; Tom Udall, New Mexico; Jeanne Shaheen, New Hampshire; Dick Blumenthal, Connecticut	Roger Wicker, Mississippi, Vice Ranking Member; Saxby Chambliss, Georgia; John Boozman, Arkansas; 1 vacant
House members	Chris Smith, New Jersey, Co-Chair; Joe Pitts, Pennsylvania; Robert Aderholt, Alabama; Phil Gingrey, Georgia; Michael Burgess, Texas	Alcee Hastings, Florida, Ranking Member; Louise Slaughter, New York; Mike McIntyre, North Carolina; Steve Cohen, Tennessee
Executive Branch	Vacant, Department of Commerce; Alexander Vershbow, Department of Defense (until July 2013); Michael Posner, Department of State (until March 2013)	

Commissioners, 112th Congress

	Majority	Minority
Senate members	Ben Cardin, Maryland, Co-Chair; Sheldon Whitehouse, Rhode Island; Tom Udall, New Mexico; Jeanne Shaheen, New Hampshire; Dick Blumenthal, Connecticut	Roger Wicker, Mississippi, Ranking Member; Saxby Chambliss, Georgia; Kelly Ayotte, New Hampshire; Marco Rubio, Florida
House members	Chris Smith, New Jersey, Chair; Joe Pitts, Pennsylvania; Robert Aderholt, Alabama; Phil Gingrey, Georgia; Michael Burgess, Texas	Alcee Hastings, Florida, Vice Ranking Member; Louise Slaughter, New York; Mike McIntyre, North Carolina; Steve Cohen, Tennessee
Executive Branch	Michael Camuñez, Department of Commerce (until February 2012); Alexander Vershbow, Department of Defense; Michael Posner, Department of State	

Commissioners, 111th Congress

	Majority	Minority
Senate members	Ben Cardin, Maryland, Chair; Chris Dodd, Connecticut; Jeanne Shaheen, New Hampshire; Sheldon Whitehouse, Rhode Island; Tom Udall, New Mexico	Sam Brownback, Kansas, Vice Ranking Member; Saxby Chambliss, Georgia; Richard Burr, North Carolina; Roger Wicker, Mississippi
House members	Alcee Hastings, Florida, Co-Chair; Ed Markey, Massachusetts; Louise Slaughter, New York; Mike McIntyre, North Carolina; G. K. Butterfield, North Carolina	Chris Smith, New Jersey, Ranking Member; Joe Pitts, Pennsylvania; Robert Aderholt, Alabama; Darrell Issa, California
Executive Branch	Vacant, Department of Commerce; Alexander Vershbow, Department of Defense; Michael Posner, Department of State	

Commissioners, 110th Congress

	Majority	Minority
Senate members	Ben Cardin, Maryland, Co-Chair; Russ Feingold, Wisconsin; Chris Dodd, Connecticut; Hillary Clinton, New York; John Kerry, Massachusetts	Sam Brownback, Kansas, Ranking Member; Gordon Smith, Oregon; Saxby Chambliss, Georgia; Richard Burr, North Carolina
House members	Alcee Hastings, Florida, Chair; Louise Slaughter, New York; Mike McIntyre, North Carolina; Hilda Solis, California; G. K. Butterfield, North Carolina	Chris Smith, New Jersey, Vice Ranking Member; Robert Aderholt, Alabama; Joe Pitts, Pennsylvania; Mike Pence, Indiana
Executive Branch	David Bohigian, Department of Commerce; Mary Beth Long, Department of Defense; David Kramer, Department of State	

Commissioners, 109th Congress

	Majority	Minority
Senate members	Sam Brownback, Kansas, Chair; Richard Burr, North Carolina; Saxby Chambliss, Georgia; Gordon Smith, Oregon; David Vitter, Louisiana	Hillary Clinton, New York, Vice Ranking Member; Chris Dodd, Connecticut; Russ Feingold, Wisconsin; Vacant
House members	Chris Smith, New Jersey, Co-Chair; Robert Aderholt, Alabama; Mike Pence, Indiana; Joe Pitts, Pennsylvania; Frank Wolf, Virginia	Ben Cardin, Maryland, Ranking Member; Alcee Hastings, Florida; Louise Slaughter, New York; Mike McIntyre, North Carolina
Executive Branch	Vacant, Department of Commerce; Vacant, Department of Defense; Vacant, Department of State	

Commissioners, 108th Congress

	Majority	Minority
Senate members	Ben Campbell, Colorado, Co-Chair; Sam Brownback, Kansas; Saxby Chambliss, Georgia; Kay Bailey Hutchison, Texas; Gordon Smith, Oregon	Hillary Clinton, New York, Ranking Member; Chris Dodd, Connecticut; Russ Feingold, Wisconsin; Bob Graham, Florida
House members	Chris Smith, New Jersey, Chair; Robert Aderholt, Alabama; Anne Northup, Kentucky; Joe Pitts, Pennsylvania; Frank Wolf, Virginia	Ben Cardin, Maryland, Vice Ranking Member; Alcee Hastings, Florida; Louise Slaughter, New York; Mike McIntyre, North Carolina
Executive Branch	Vacant, Department of Commerce; Vacant, Department of Defense; Vacant, Department of State	

Commissioners, 107th Congress

	Majority	Minority
Senate members	Ben Campbell, Colorado, Chair; Sam Brownback, Kansas; Kay Bailey Hutchison, Texas; Gordon Smith, Oregon; George Voinovich, Ohio	Hillary Clinton, New York, Vice Ranking Member; Chris Dodd, Connecticut; Russ Feingold, Wisconsin; Bob Graham, Florida
House members	Chris Smith, New Jersey, Co-Chair; Robert Aderholt, Alabama; Joe Pitts, Pennsylvania; Zach Wamp, Tennessee; Frank Wolf, Virginia	Ben Cardin, Maryland, Ranking Member; Alcee Hastings, Florida; Steny Hoyer, Maryland; Louise Slaughter, New York
Executive Branch	William Lash, Department of Commerce; Jack Crouch, Department of Defense; Lorne Craner, Department of State	

Commissioners, 106th Congress

	Majority	Minority
Senate members	Ben Campbell, Colorado, Co-Chair; Spencer Abraham, Michigan; Sam Brownback, Kansas; Tim Hutchinson, Arkansas; Kay Bailey Hutchison, Texas	Chris Dodd, Connecticut, Ranking Member; Russ Feingold, Wisconsin; Bob Graham, Florida; Frank Lautenberg, New Jersey
House members	Chris Smith, New Jersey, Chair; Michael Forbes, New York; Jim Greenwood, Pennsylvania; Matt Salmon, Arizona; Frank Wolf, Virginia; Joe Pitts, Pennsylvania	Ben Cardin, Maryland, Vice Ranking Member; Steny Hoyer, Maryland; Ed Markey, Massachusetts; Louise Slaughter, New York
Executive Branch	Patrick Mulloy, Department of Commerce; Edward Wagner, Department of Defense; Harold Koh, Department of State	

Commissioners, 105th Congress

	Majority	Minority
Senate members	Al D'Amato, New York, Chair; Spencer Abraham, Michigan; Conrad Burns, Montana; Ben Campbell, Colorado; Olympia Snowe, Maine	Russ Feingold, Wisconsin, Vice Ranking Member; Bob Graham, Florida; Frank Lautenberg, New Jersey; Harry Reid, Nevada
House members	Chris Smith, New Jersey, Co-Chair; Jon Christensen, Nebraska; John Porter, Illinois; Matt Salmon, Arizona; Frank Wolf, Virginia	Ben Cardin, Maryland, Ranking Member; Steny Hoyer, Maryland; Ed Markey, Massachusetts; Louise Slaughter, New York
Executive Branch	Vacant, Department of Commerce; Ash Carter, Department of Defense; John Shattuck, Department of State	

Commissioners, 104th Congress

	Majority	Minority
Senate members	Al D'Amato, New York, Co-Chair; Spencer Abraham, Michigan; Ben Campbell, Colorado; Dirk Kempthorne, Idaho; Rick Santorum, Pennsylvania	Russ Feingold, Wisconsin, Ranking Member; Bob Graham, Florida; Frank Lautenberg, New Jersey; Harry Reid, Nevada
House members	Chris Smith, New Jersey, Chair; David Funderburk, North Carolina; John Porter, Illinois; Matt Salmon, Arizona; Frank Wolf, Virginia	Ben Cardin, Maryland, Vice Ranking Member; Steny Hoyer, Maryland; Ed Markey, Massachusetts; Bill Richardson, New Mexico
Executive Branch	Charles Meissner, Department of Commerce; Ash Carter, Department of Defense; John Shattuck, Department of State	

Commissioners, 103rd Congress

	Majority	Minority
Senate members	Dennis DeConcini, Arizona, Chair; Bob Graham, Florida; Frank Lautenberg, New Jersey; Barbara Mikulski, Maryland; Harry Reid, Nevada	Al D'Amato, New York, Vice Ranking Member; Chuck Grassley, Iowa; Connie Mack, Florida; Arlen Specter, Pennsylvania
House members	Steny Hoyer, Maryland, Co-Chair; Ben Cardin, Maryland; Ed Markey, Massachusetts; Frank McCloskey, Indiana; Bill Richardson, New Mexico	Chris Smith, New Jersey, Ranking Member; Hamilton Fish, New York; John Porter, Illinois; Frank Wolf, Virginia
Executive Branch	Charles Meissner, Department of Commerce; Ash Carter, Department of Defense; John Shattuck, Department of State	

Commissioners, 102nd Congress

	Majority	Minority
Senate members	Dennis DeConcini, Arizona, Co-Chair; Wyche Fowler, Georgia; Frank Lautenberg, New Jersey; Harry Reid, Nevada; Tim Wirth, Colorado	Al D'Amato, New York, Ranking Member; Larry Craig, Idaho; John Heinz, Pennsylvania (until April 1991); Arlen Specter, Pennsylvania (from April 1991); 1 vacant
House members	Steny Hoyer, Maryland, Chair; Dante Fascell, Florida; Ed Feighan, Ohio; Ed Markey, Massachusetts; Bill Richardson, New Mexico	John Porter, Illinois, Vice Ranking Member; Don Ritter, Pennsylvania; Chris Smith, New Jersey; Frank Wolf, Virginia
Executive Branch	William Fritts, Department of Commerce; Stephen Hadley, Department of Defense; Patricia Diaz Dennis, Department of State	

Commissioners, 101st Congress

	Majority	Minority
Senate members	Dennis DeConcini, Arizona, Chair; Wyche Fowler, Georgia; Frank Lautenberg, New Jersey; Harry Reid, Nevada; Tim Wirth, Colorado	Al D'Amato, New York, Vice Ranking Member; John Heinz, Pennsylvania; James McClure, Idaho; Malcolm Wallop, Wyoming
House members	Steny Hoyer, Maryland, Co-Chair; Dante Fascell, Florida; Ed Feighan, Ohio; Ed Markey, Massachusetts; Bill Richardson, New Mexico	John Porter, Illinois, Ranking Member; Don Ritter, Pennsylvania; Chris Smith, New Jersey; Frank Wolf, Virginia
Executive Branch	William Fritts, Department of Commerce; Stephen Hadley, Department of Defense; Patricia Diaz Dennis, Department of State	

Commissioners, 100th Congress

	Majority	Minority
Senate members	Dennis DeConcini, Arizona, Co-Chair; Wyche Fowler, Georgia; Frank Lautenberg, New Jersey; Harry Reid, Nevada; Tim Wirth, Colorado	Al D'Amato, New York, Ranking Member; John Heinz, Pennsylvania; James McClure, Idaho; Malcolm Wallop, Wyoming
House members	Steny Hoyer, Maryland, Chair; Dante Fascell, Florida; Ed Feighan, Ohio; Ed Markey, Massachusetts; Bill Richardson, New Mexico	Jack Kemp, New York, Vice Ranking Member; John Porter, Illinois; Don Ritter, Pennsylvania; Chris Smith, New Jersey
Executive Branch	Louis Laun, Department of Commerce; Ronald Lehman, Department of Defense; Richard Schifter, Department of State	

Commissioners, 99th Congress

	Majority	Minority
Senate members	Al D'Amato, New York, Chair; John Heinz, Pennsylvania; Gordon Humphrey, New Hampshire; James McClure, Idaho; Malcolm Wallop, Wyoming	Dennis DeConcini, Arizona, Vice Ranking Member; Pat Leahy, Vermont; Russell Long, Louisiana; Claiborne Pell, Rhode Island
House members	Steny Hoyer, Maryland, Co-Chair; Dante Fascell, Florida; Ed Markey, Massachusetts; Tim Wirth, Colorado; Sidney Yates, Illinois	Jack Kemp, New York, Ranking Member; John Porter, Illinois; Don Ritter, Pennsylvania; Chris Smith, New Jersey
Executive Branch	Vacant, Department of Commerce; Richard Perle, Department of Defense; Richard Schifter, Department of State	

Commissioners, 98th Congress

	Majority	Minority
Senate members	Dennis DeConcini, Arizona, Co-Chair; Pat Leahy, Vermont; Claiborne Pell, Rhode Island; 2 vacant	Al D'Amato, New York, Ranking Member; Orrin Hatch, Utah; John Heinz, Pennsylvania; 1 vacant
House members	Dante Fascell, Florida, Chair; Sidney Yates, Illinois; Tim Wirth, Colorado; Ed Markey, Massachusetts; 1 vacant	Don Ritter, Pennsylvania, Vice Ranking Member; Chris Smith, New Jersey; 2 vacant
Executive Branch	Alfred Kingon, Department of Commerce; Richard Perle, Department of Defense; Elliott Abrams, Department of State	

Commissioners, 97th Congress

	Majority	Minority
Senate members	Bob Dole, Kansas, Co-Chair; Al D'Amato, New York; Orrin Hatch, Utah; John Heinz, Pennsylvania; 1 vacant	Pat Leahy, Vermont, Ranking Member; Claiborne Pell, Rhode Island; 2 vacant
House members	Dante Fascell, Florida, Chair; Jonathan Bingham, New York; Tim Wirth, Colorado; Sidney Yates, Illinois; 1 vacant	Millicent Fenwick, New Jersey, Vice Ranking Member; Don Ritter, Pennsylvania; 2 vacant
Executive Branch	William Morris, Department of Commerce; Richard Perle, Department of Defense; Stephen Palmer, Department of State (until May 1981); Elliott Abrams, Department of State (from May 1981)	

Commissioners, 96th Congress

	Majority	Minority
Senate members	Claiborne Pell, Rhode Island, Co-Chair; Pat Leahy, Vermont; George McGovern, South Dakota; Richard Stone, Florida; 1 vacant	Bob Dole, Kansas, Ranking Member; Jacob Javits, New York; 2 vacant
House members	Dante Fascell, Florida, Chair; Jonathan Bingham, New York; Paul Simon, Illinois; Sidney Yates, Illinois; 1 vacant	John Buchanan, Alabama Vice Ranking Member; Millicent Fenwick, New Jersey; 2 vacant
Executive Branch	Herta Seidman, Department of Commerce; David McGiffert, Department of Defense; Patt Derian, Department of State	

Commissioners, 95th Congress

	Majority	Minority
Senate members	Claiborne Pell, Rhode Island, Co-Chair; Dick Clark, Iowa; Pat Leahy, Vermont; Richard Stone, Florida; 1 vacant	Clifford Case, New Jersey, Ranking Member; Bob Dole, Kansas; 2 vacant
House members	Dante Fascell, Florida, Chair; Jonathan Bingham, New York; Paul Simon, Illinois; Sidney Yates, Illinois; 1 vacant	John Buchanan, Alabama Vice Ranking Member; Millicent Fenwick, New Jersey; 2 vacant
Executive Branch	Frank Weil, Department of Commerce; David McGiffert, Department of Defense; Patt Derian, Department of State	

Commissioners, 94th Congress

	Majority	Minority
Senate members	Claiborne Pell, Rhode Island, Co-Chair; Dick Clark, Iowa; Pat Leahy, Vermont; Richard Stone, Florida; 1 vacant	Clifford Case, New Jersey, Ranking Member; James Buckley, New York; 2 vacant
House members	Dante Fascell, Florida, Chair; Jonathan Bingham, New York; Paul Simon, Illinois; Sidney Yates, Illinois; 1 vacant	John Buchanan, Alabama Vice Ranking Member; Millicent Fenwick, New Jersey; 2 vacant
Executive Branch	Mansfield Sprague, Department of Commerce; James Poor, Department of Defense; Monroe Leigh, Department of State	

== Historical leadership ==
Start	End	Chair	Co-Chair	Ranking Member	Vice Ranking Member
1976	1979	Rep. Dante Fascell (D-FL)	Sen. Claiborne Pell (D-RI)	Sen. Clifford Case (R-NJ)	Rep. John Buchanan (R-AL)
1979	1981	Rep. Dante Fascell (D-FL)	Sen. Claiborne Pell (D-RI)	Sen. Bob Dole (R-KS)	Rep. John Buchanan (R-AL)
1981	1983	Rep. Dante Fascell (D-FL)	Sen. Bob Dole (R-KS)	Sen. Pat Leahy (D-VT)	Rep. Millicent Fenwick (R-NJ)
1983	1985	Rep. Dante Fascell (D-FL)	Sen. Dennis DeConcini (D-AZ)	Sen. Al D'Amato (R-NY)	Rep. Don Ritter (R-PA)
1985	1987	Sen. Al D'Amato (R-NY)	Rep. Steny Hoyer (D-MD)	Rep. Jack Kemp (R-NY)	Sen. Dennis DeConcini (D-AZ)
1987	1989	Rep. Steny Hoyer (D-MD)	Sen. Dennis DeConcini (D-AZ)	Sen. Al D'Amato (R-NY)	Rep. Jack Kemp (R-NY)
1989	1991	Sen. Dennis DeConcini (D-AZ)	Rep. Steny Hoyer (D-MD)	Rep. John Porter (R-IL)	Sen. Al D'Amato (R-NY)
1991	1993	Rep. Steny Hoyer (D-MD)	Sen. Dennis DeConcini (D-AZ)	Sen. Al D'Amato (R-NY)	Rep. John Porter (R-IL)
1993	1995	Sen. Dennis DeConcini (D-AZ)	Rep. Steny Hoyer (D-MD)	Rep. Chris Smith (R-NJ)	Sen. Al D'Amato (R-NY)
1995	1997	Rep. Chris Smith (R-NJ)	Sen. Al D'Amato (R-NY)	Sen. Russ Feingold (D-WI)	Rep. Ben Cardin (D-MD)
1997	1999	Sen. Al D'Amato (R-NY)	Rep. Chris Smith (R-NJ)	Rep. Ben Cardin (D-MD)	Sen. Russ Feingold (D-WI)
1999	2001	Rep. Chris Smith (R-NJ)	Sen. Ben Campbell (R-CO)	Sen. Chris Dodd (D-CT)	Rep. Ben Cardin (D-MD)
2001	2003	Sen. Ben Campbell (R-CO)	Rep. Chris Smith (R-NJ)	Rep. Ben Cardin (D-MD)	Sen. Hillary Clinton (D-NY)
2003	2005	Rep. Chris Smith (R-NJ)	Sen. Ben Campbell (R-CO)	Sen. Hillary Clinton (D-NY)	Rep. Ben Cardin (D-MD)
2005	2007	Sen. Sam Brownback (R-KS)	Rep. Chris Smith (R-NJ)	Rep. Ben Cardin (D-MD)	Sen. Hillary Clinton (D-NY)
2007	2009	Rep. Alcee Hastings (D-FL)	Sen. Ben Cardin (D-MD)	Sen. Sam Brownback (R-KS)	Rep. Chris Smith (R-NJ)
2009	2011	Sen. Ben Cardin (D-MD)	Rep. Alcee Hastings (D-FL)	Rep. Chris Smith (R-NJ)	Sen. Sam Brownback (R-KS)
2011	2013	Rep. Chris Smith (R-NJ)	Sen. Ben Cardin (D-MD)	Sen. Roger Wicker (R-MS)	Rep. Alcee Hastings (D-FL)
2013	2015	Sen. Ben Cardin (D-MD)	Rep. Chris Smith (R-NJ)	Rep. Alcee Hastings (D-FL)	Sen. Roger Wicker (R-MS)
2015	2017	Rep. Chris Smith (R-NJ)	Sen. Roger Wicker (R-MS)	Sen. Ben Cardin (D-MD)	Rep. Alcee Hastings (D-FL)
2017	2019	Sen. Roger Wicker (R-MS)	Rep. Chris Smith (R-NJ)	Rep. Alcee Hastings (D-FL)	Sen. Ben Cardin (D-MD)
2019	2021	Rep. Alcee Hastings (D-FL)	Sen. Roger Wicker (R-MS)	Sen. Ben Cardin (D-MD)	Rep. Joe Wilson (R-SC)
2021	2023	Sen. Ben Cardin (D-MD)	Rep. Alcee Hastings (D-FL)	Rep. Joe Wilson (R-SC)	Sen. Roger Wicker (R-MS)
2021	2023	Sen. Ben Cardin (D-MD)	Rep. Steve Cohen (D-TN)	Rep. Joe Wilson (R-SC)	Sen. Roger Wicker (R-MS)
2023	2025	Rep. Joe Wilson (R-SC)	Sen. Ben Cardin (D-MD)	Sen. Roger Wicker (R-MS)	Rep. Steve Cohen (D-TN)
2025	present	Sen. Roger Wicker (R-MS)	Rep. Joe Wilson (R-SC)	Rep. Steve Cohen (D-TN)	Sen. Sheldon Whitehouse (D-RI)
