= Dow Lohnes =

Former Washington DC law firm

- Headquarters: Washington, D.C.
- No. of offices: 3
- No. of attorneys: 200+
- Revenue: $95,500,000
- Date founded: 1918
- Company type: PLLC
- Dissolved: 2014 – merged with Cooley LLP

Dow Lohnes PLLC was an AmLaw 200 American law firm headquartered in Washington, D.C.

== History ==
The firm was founded as Dow, Lohnes & Albertson in 1918. In 1928, Fayette B. Dow encouraged his partner Horace Lohnes to investigate the regulation of radio transmitters under the newly-established Federal Radio Commission, and the potential to develop a clientele engaged in broadcasting.

Fred W. Albertson represented FM radio pioneer Edwin Armstrong, as well as Douglas Fairbanks and Mary Pickford. He and Lohnes built the firm's practice of representing companies with interests in both television and radio.

By 1990 the firm had 200 lawyers and grew to more than 400 lawyers over the next decade.

Dow Lohnes Sports and Entertainment LLC was established in 2003 as a division within Dow Lohnes PLLC.

In January 2014, Dow Lohnes merged with Cooley LLP.

== Offices ==
- Atlanta
- Madrid
- New York
- Norman, Oklahoma
- Tokyo
- Washington, D.C.

== Notable partners and employees ==
- Fayette B. Dow – founding member, former general counsel of the National Petroleum Association, Western Petroleum Refiners Association, and American Petroleum Institute.
- Horace L. Lohnes – founding member.
- Fred W. Albertson – founding member.
- Bernard Long – former member, former Assistant U.S. Attorney in Washington, D.C., and Principal Attorney in the Office of Chief Counsel of the Bureau of Internal Revenue (now Internal Revenue Service).
- Henry M. Rivera – former member, former commissioner of the Federal Communications Commission
- Milton Robert Carr – former nine term Congressman from Michigan
