= Assistant Secretary of State for Democracy, Human Rights, and Labor =

U.S. government position

- Seal of the United States Department of State

- Flag of an Assistant Secretary of State

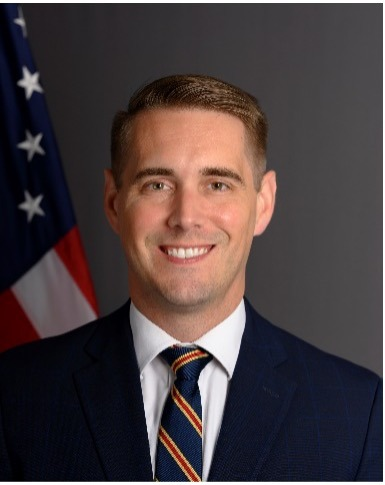
- Incumbent; Riley Barnes since October 10, 2025
- Reports to: Under Secretary of State for Foreign Assistance, Humanitarian Affairs and Religious Freedom
- Nominator: President of the United States
- Inaugural holder: James M. Wilson, Jr.
- Formation: 1976
- Website: Official Website

The assistant secretary of state for democracy, human rights, and labor is the head of the Bureau of Democracy, Human Rights, and Labor within the United States Department of State. The assistant secretary of state for democracy, human rights, and labor reports to the under secretary foreign assistance, humanitarian affairs and religious freedom.

== List of Assistant Secretaries of State for Human Rights and Humanitarian Affairs, 1976 — 1993 ==
#	Name	Assumed office	Left office	President served under
1	James M. Wilson, Jr.	November 29, 1976	April 28, 1977	Gerald Ford
2	Patricia M. Derian	August 17, 1977	January 19, 1981	Jimmy Carter
3	Elliott Abrams	December 12, 1981	July 17, 1985	Ronald Reagan
4	Richard Schifter	October 31, 1985	April 3, 1992	Ronald Reagan and George H. W. Bush
5	Patricia Diaz Dennis	August 24, 1992	January 20, 1993	George H. W. Bush

While Ernest W. Lefever was nominated for the office by Reagan in 1981, his nomination was rejected by the Senate Foreign Relations Committee and he withdrew from consideration.

== List of Assistant Secretaries of State for Democracy, Human Rights, and Labor, 1993 — Present ==
#	Name	Assumed office	Left office	President served under
6	John Shattuck	June 2, 1993	November 13, 1998	Bill Clinton
7	Harold Hongju Koh	November 13, 1998	January 20, 2001	Bill Clinton
8	Lorne Craner	June 4, 2001	July 31, 2004	George W. Bush
9	Barry Lowenkron	October 14, 2005	August 28, 2007	George W. Bush
10	David J. Kramer	March 21, 2008	January 20, 2009	George W. Bush
11	Michael H. Posner	September 23, 2009	March 8, 2013	Barack Obama
-	Uzra Zeya (acting)	March 8, 2013	April 3, 2014	Barack Obama
12	Tom Malinowski	April 3, 2014	January 20, 2017	Barack Obama
-	Virginia Bennett (acting)	January 20, 2017	November 30, 2017	Donald Trump
-	Michael Kozak (Senior Bureau Official)	November 30, 2017	September 12, 2019	Donald Trump
13	Robert Destro	September 23, 2019	January 20, 2021	Donald Trump
-	Lisa J. Peterson (acting)	January 20, 2021	September 6, 2022	Joe Biden
-	Erin M. Barclay (acting)	September 6, 2022	January 21, 2024	Joe Biden
-	Robert S. Gilchrist (Senior Bureau Official)	January 21, 2024	August 8, 2024	Joe Biden
14	Dafna Hochman Rand	August 8, 2024	January 20, 2025	Joe Biden
-	Jonathan Mennuti (acting)	January 20, 2025	February 10, 2025	Donald Trump
-	Riley M. Barnes (Senior Bureau Official)	February 10, 2025	June 17, 2025	Donald Trump
-	Jacob A. McGee (Senior Bureau Official)	June 17, 2025	October 10, 2025	Donald Trump
15	Riley M. Barnes	October 10, 2025	Present	Donald Trump
