= Barry Lowenkron =

American specialist in foreign relations

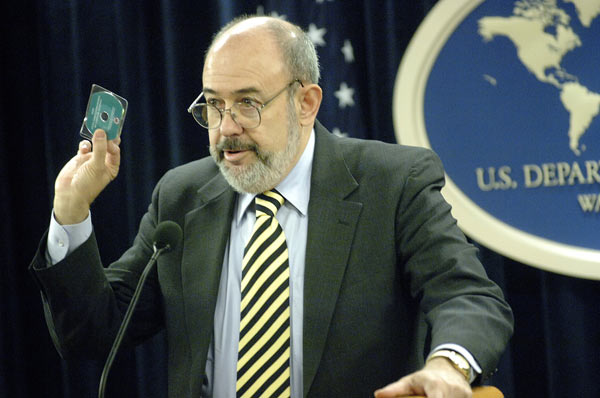

9th Assistant Secretary of State for Democracy, Human Rights, and Labor
- In office October 14, 2005 – August 28, 2007
- President: George W. Bush
- Preceded by: Lorne Craner
- Succeeded by: David J. Kramer

Personal details
- Born: 1952 (age 73–74)
- Education: Northeastern University, Johns Hopkins University

Barry F. Lowenkron (born 1952) is an American specialist in foreign relations. He was Vice President of the Program on Global Security & Sustainability at the MacArthur Foundation from 2007 to 2014.

== Life ==
Lowenkron is a graduate of the Maimonides School and of Northeastern University (1973). He holds an M.A. (1977) from the Nitze School of Advanced International studies at the Johns Hopkins University. From 2005 to 2007 Lowenkron was Assistant Secretary of State for the Bureau of Democracy, Human Rights and Labor.

From 1979 until 2005, Lowenkron was Adjunct Lecturer in American Foreign Policy at the Nitze School of Advanced International Studies of the Johns Hopkins University, where he taught courses on American Foreign Policy. He has been a Ford Foundation Fellow on Arms Control and Eastern Europe and a Hubert H. Humphrey Fellow. Mr. Lowenkron is a member of the Council on Foreign Relations.

Al Kamen of The Washington Post'' calls Lowenkron a "longtime foreign policy guru...who has worked at the Pentagon, the CIA and the State Department's policy planning shop."

== Honors ==
- Ford Foundation Fellow on Arms Control and Eastern Europe
- Hubert H. Humphrey Fellow

Government offices
Preceded by Lorne Craner	Assistant Secretary of State for Democracy, Human Rights, and Labor; October 14, 2005 – August 28, 2007	Succeeded by David J. Kramer
