= Sarah Labowitz =

Sarah Labowitz is a senior fellow at the Carnegie Endowment for International Peace and a documentary filmmaker. Prior to that, she was the Texas policy and advocacy director for the American Civil Liberties Union, where she defends Texans' voting rights and healthcare freedoms. Labowitz also served as the policy and communications director for the City of Houston Housing and Community Development Department. In 2013, Labowitz co-founded the NYU Stern Center for Business and Human Rights, an academic research and advocacy organization at the New York University Stern School of Business and the first center to focus on human rights as an integral part of a business school. She also was a research scholar in Business and Society at Stern. Prior to Stern, Labowitz served as a policy advisor under Hillary Clinton at the U.S. Department of State from 2009 – 2013 on democracy, human rights, and cyber policy.

== Biography ==
Labowitz graduated from Grinnell College in 2004 with a BA in History. She then went on to obtain an MA in international relations from the Fletcher School of Law and Diplomacy at Tufts University.

In 2012, Labowitz was listed on Forbes Magazine's "30 Under 30" list for law and policy. She served on the ExxonMobil External Citizenship Advisory Panel before publicly resigning in February 2017, to protest the company's lawsuits against civil society critics. Labowitz is a fellow of the Truman National Security Project and a member of the board of directors of the Houston Committee on Foreign Relations.
