= Dafna Hochman Rand =

American political scientist and diplomat

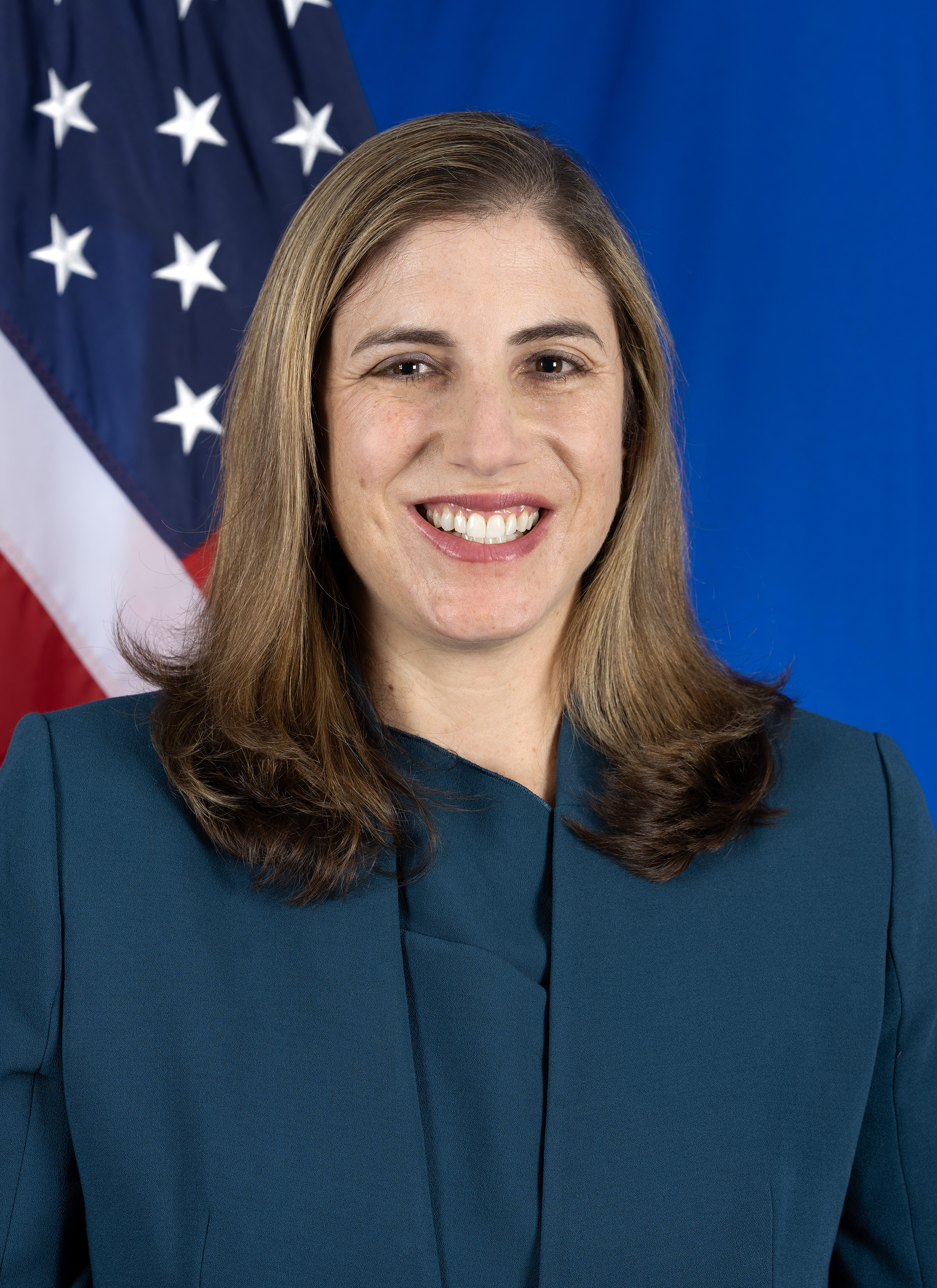

14th Assistant Secretary of State for Democracy, Human Rights, and Labor
- In office August 8, 2024 – January 20, 2025
- President: Joe Biden
- Preceded by: Robert Destro (2021)
- Succeeded by: Riley Barnes

Dafna Hochman Rand is an American political scientist and diplomat. She served as U.S. Assistant Secretary of State for Democracy, Human Rights, and Labor in the Biden administration.

== Early life and education ==
Rand graduated from Lexington High School (Massachusetts) in 1996. She received her BA from Harvard University and her PhD in political science from Columbia University.

== Career ==
Early in her career, Rand worked at Seeds of Peace International Camp in Maine and the Center for Jewish-Arab Economic Development in Herzliyah, Israel.

Rand served as the foreign policy advisor to US senator Frank Lautenberg from 2002 to 2004.

She served as deputy assistant secretary in the Bureau of Democracy, Human Rights and Labor at the US Department of State from 2015 until 2017.

She was the vice president of policy and research at Mercy Corps, a non-governmental organization, from 2017 to 2021.

Rand was director of the Office of Foreign Assistance at the State Department from June 21, 2021, to May 12, 2023.

She was confirmed as U.S. Assistant Secretary of State for Democracy, Human Rights, and Labor on August 1, 2024.

== Publications ==
- Roots of the Arab Spring: Contested Authority and Political Change in the Middle East. University of Pennsylvania Press. 2013. ISBN 9780812245301.
- Re-Engaging the Middle East: A New Vision for U.S. Policy. Brookings Institution Press. 2020. ISBN 9780815737407.
