= James M. Wilson Jr. =

US Assistant Secretary of State (1918–2009)

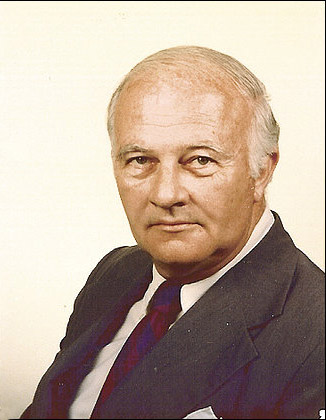

1st Assistant Secretary of State for Human Rights and Humanitarian Affairs
- In office November 29, 1976 – April 28, 1977
- President: Gerald Ford
- Preceded by: Position established
- Succeeded by: Patricia M. Derian

Personal details
- Born: July 8, 1918 Mokansan, China
- Died: November 15, 2009 (aged 91) Washington, D.C., US
- Education: Swarthmore College, The Fletcher School of Law and Diplomacy, Harvard Law School

James Morrison Wilson Jr. (July 8, 1918 – November 15, 2009) was an official in the United States Department of State who launched the State Department's annual country reports on human rights in 1975, and who served as Assistant Secretary of State for Human Rights and Humanitarian Affairs from 1975 to 1977.

== Biography ==
Wilson was born on July 8, 1918, in Mokansan in Sanmen County, Republic of China. His parents were American missionaries, and Wilson grew up in Hangzhou and Shanghai. After the January 28 Incident, his family decided to leave China in 1935, leaving via the Trans-Siberian Railway and traveling through the Soviet Union to Europe, and returning from there to the U.S. Wilson then attended Swarthmore College, graduating with a B.A. in 1939. He then began postgraduate studies at the Graduate Institute of International Studies in Geneva. After his return to the United States he attended The Fletcher School of Law and Diplomacy, receiving a master's degree in 1940.

After college, Wilson briefly worked as a newspaper reporter in Louisville, Kentucky, and then joined the Kentucky National Guard. He was on board a ship sailing to Corregidor Island at the time of the Japanese attack on Pearl Harbor. As a result, Wilson's unit was called up and Wilson spent the rest of World War II in the United States Army. He served in North Africa, Italy, and France, becoming an aide of General Lucian Truscott. By the end of the war, he had obtained the rank of lieutenant colonel and had been awarded the Bronze Star Medal twice and the Purple Heart twice.

After the war, Wilson attended Harvard Law School, graduating in 1948. He then joined the United States Department of Defense in Washington, D.C., where he worked to negotiate agreements about U.S. military bases abroad. In 1957, he transferred to the United States Department of State. He served in Washington, D.C., Paris, and Madrid. He became Deputy Chief of Mission at Bangkok in 1964. He was then Deputy Chief of Mission in Manila from 1966 to 1970.

Wilson returned to Washington, D.C., in 1970, becoming Deputy Assistant Secretary of State for East Asian and Pacific Affairs under Marshall Green. There, he was almost immediately thrust into the controversy about the Pentagon Papers. After Wilson suffered a heart attack, he was reassigned to the White House and there led negotiations related to the Trust Territory of the Pacific Islands. These negotiations resulted in the Northern Mariana Islands becoming a U.S. commonwealth in 1975.

In 1976, President of the United States Gerald Ford named Wilson the first ever Assistant Secretary of State for Human Rights and Humanitarian Affairs. Deputy Secretary of State, Robert S. Ingersoll, explained the creation of the position as "to expand and upgrade the time and attention devoted to human rights considerations in the work of the Department of State" after a period of mostly disorganized consideration of human rights. Wilson and his new office were tasked with convincing regional bureaus of the importance of human rights in U.S. foreign policy in the wake of congressional activism. Wilson also launched the practice of preparing annual country reports on human rights in various countries around the world. United States Secretary of State Henry Kissinger initially wanted these reports to remain classified, but the United States Congress insisted that the reports be made public.

Wilson retired in 1978. In retirement, he served on the board of the International Rescue Committee.

Wilson died on November 15, 2009, in Washington, D.C.

Government offices
Preceded by New Office	Assistant Secretary of State for Human Rights and Humanitarian Affairs; November 29, 1976 – April 28, 1977	Succeeded by Patricia M. Derian
