= Robert Destro =

American lawyer and government official

Robert A. Destro
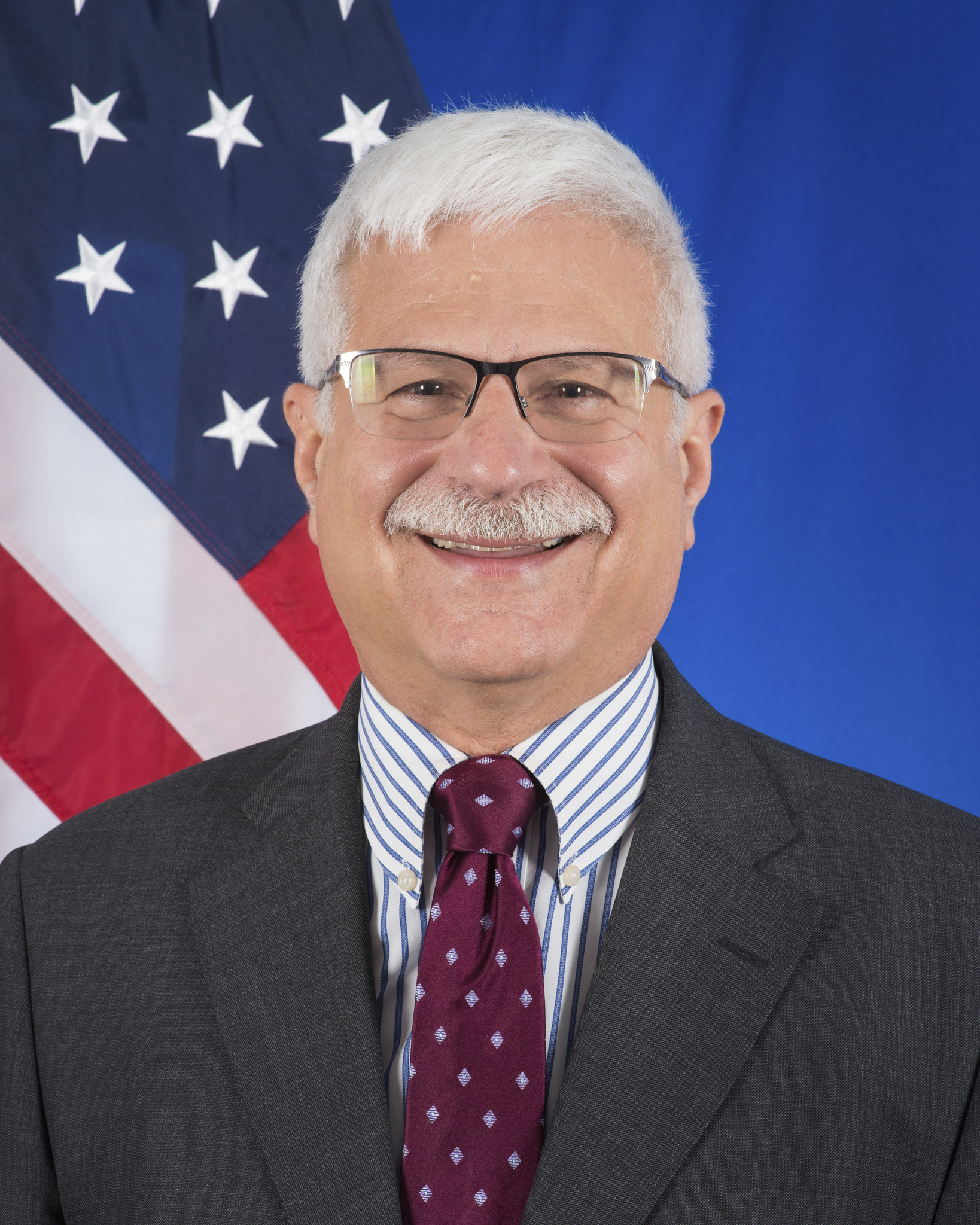

United States Special Coordinator for Tibetan Issues
- In office October 14, 2020 – January 20, 2021
- President: Donald Trump
- Preceded by: Sarah Sewall (2017)
- Succeeded by: Uzra Zeya

13th Assistant Secretary of State for Democracy, Human Rights, and Labor
- In office September 23, 2019 – January 20, 2021
- President: Donald Trump
- Preceded by: Tom Malinowski
- Succeeded by: Dafna Hochman Rand (2024)

Member of the United States Commission on Civil Rights
- In office 1983–1989

Personal details
- Education: Miami University (BA); UC Berkeley School of Law (JD)

Robert A. Destro is an American attorney, academic, and government official who served as Assistant Secretary of State for Democracy, Human Rights, and Labor from September 2019 to January 2021. In October 2020, he also became the United States Special Coordinator on Tibetan Issues. He previously served on the United States Commission on Civil Rights from 1983 to 1989 and as a professor of law at The Catholic University of America.

== Education ==
Destro earned a B.A. from Miami University in Ohio, and a J.D. from the University of California, Berkeley.

== Career ==
Destro is a professor of law at the Columbus School of Law at The Catholic University of America. He teaches at Catholic University since 1982 and served as an Interim Dean from 1999 to 2001. He also founded the Interdisciplinary Program in Law & Religion and was director of the Institute for Policy Research and Catholic Studies from 2017 to 2019, both at Catholic University.

Destro is a human rights advocate and a civil rights attorney with expertise in elections and employment law. His legal work includes collaboration with the Peace Research Institute Oslo in a fifteen-year dialogue among Muslim, Christian, and Jewish legal, business, and religious leaders in the United States and the Middle East and efforts promoting the release of political prisoners and prisoners of conscience in the Middle East.

As a U.S. civil rights commissioner from 1983 to 1989, Destro focused on disability-, national origin-, and religious-based discrimination. From 1977 to 1982, he also served as General Counsel to the Catholic League for Religious and Civil Rights. He was also special counsel to the Ohio Attorney General and the Ohio Secretary of State on election law matters from 2004 to 2006.

In 2011, Destro sent a report about the disappearance of Robert Levinson to the Federal Bureau of Investigation, and he also alerted the FBI about the involvement of the Fellowship Foundation. He also wrote a letter in mid-2011 to Ali Khamenei on the request of Douglas Coe, which was delivered to the Iranian ambassador in Paris. As a result, the ambassador requested an urgent meeting in October of that year, being days away from returning to Tehran; however, since Destro could not travel with such short notice, the Fellowship Foundation was represented at that meeting by Ory Eshel. The meeting took place on 30 October 2011 at the ambassador's residence.

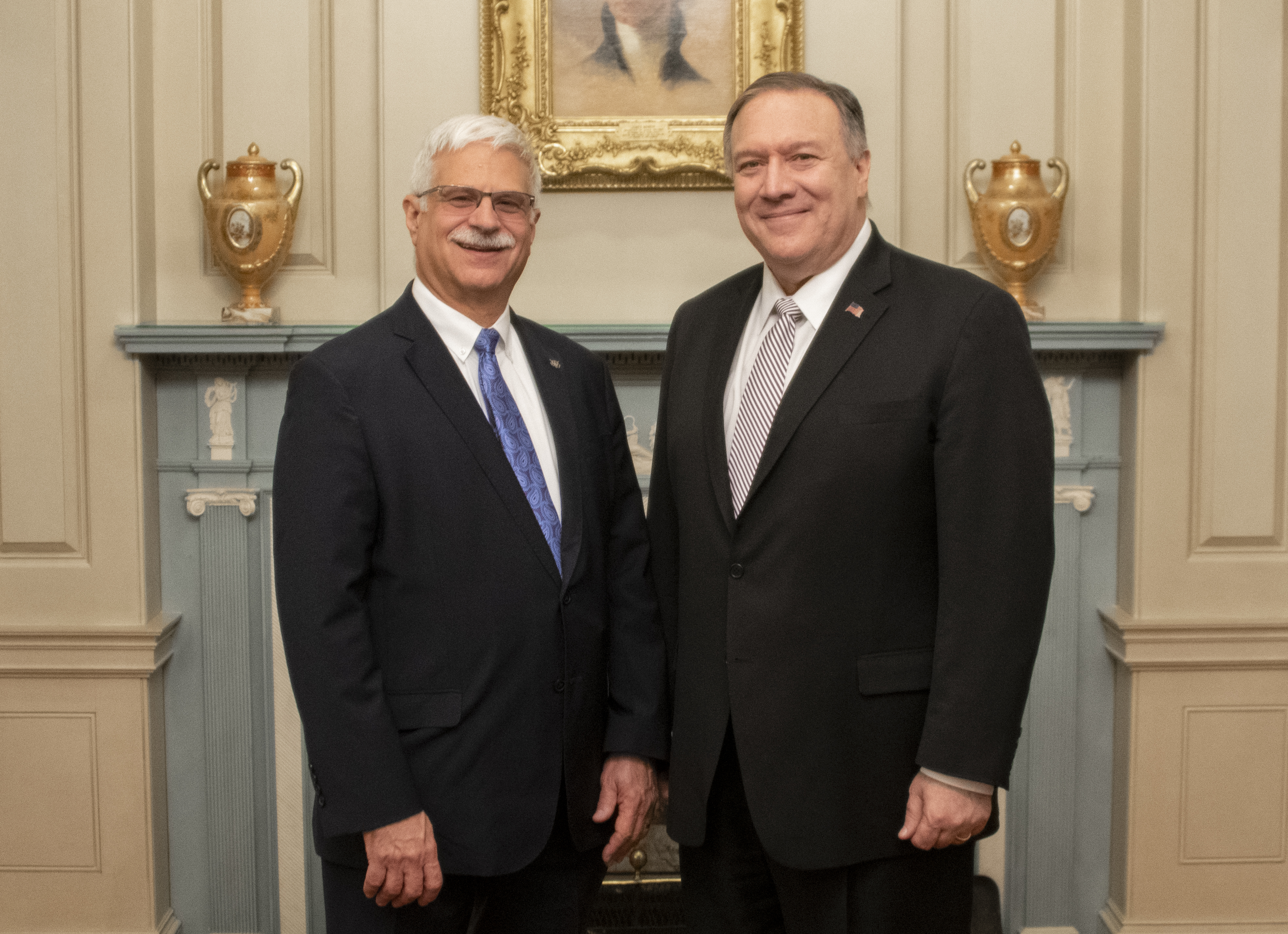
Destro meets with U.S. Secretary of State Michael R. Pompeo at the U.S. Department of State in Washington, D.C., on November 22, 2019.

In September 2019, Destro became the Assistant Secretary of State for Democracy, Human Rights, and Labor. In October 2020, he was appointed as the U.S. Special Coordinator for Tibetan Issues, a role that "will lead U.S. efforts to promote dialogue between the People’s Republic of China (PRC) and the Dalai Lama or his representatives; protect the unique religious, cultural, and linguistic identity of Tibetans; and press for their human rights to be respected."

Destro stated that he and the US support complete autonomy for Tibet, which is the Dalai Lama's position. He cited the fact that half a million Tibetans had entered forced labour as a violation of human rights. He said that he believes that "all people should be allowed access to Tibet" and restated the US's position that the only one to choose the Dalai Lama's successor should be the Dalai Lama himself.

On 15 October 2020, he met with Lobsang Sangay at the Harry S Truman Building, which India Today stated "is being seen as Washington’s recognition of the Tibetan government-in-exile."

He stated that he was aware of a security audit of Ultrasurf commissioned by the United States Department of State.

Destro confirmed to the Washington Post that, during the 2021 United States Capitol attack, he met in the State Department with "Big Lie" supporters Joe Oltmann, a Colorado podcaster, and Matthew DePerno, lawyer and candidate in the 2022 Michigan Attorney General election. While Destro declined to disclose the substance of the meeting, Oltmann posted on social media that he had met with "the right people" in the State Department and that "they said, 'If this [the false claims of irregularities in the 2020 US Presidential election ] is true, this is a coup.'"
