= David J. Kramer =

American government official

David Kramer
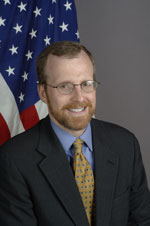

10th Assistant Secretary of State for Democracy, Human Rights, and Labor
- In office March 21, 2008 – January 20, 2009
- President: George W. Bush
- Preceded by: Barry Lowenkron
- Succeeded by: Michael H. Posner

Personal details
- Born: 1964 (age 61–62) Malden, Massachusetts, U.S.
- Party: Republican
- Education: Tufts University (BA); Harvard University (MA)

David J. Kramer (born 1964) was United States Assistant Secretary of State for Democracy, Human Rights, and Labor from 2008 to 2009. He was President of Freedom House from October 2010 to November 2014, and later worked at the McCain Institute. Following a professorship at the Florida International University, he became executive director of the George W. Bush Institute.

== Early life and education ==
David J. Kramer was born in Malden, Massachusetts, in December 1964 to Jewish parents. He grew up in Middleborough, Massachusetts, where he studied Russian in high school. He was educated at Tufts University, receiving his B.A. in Soviet Studies and Political Science in 1986. His advisor there was Sally Terry. Kramer then went on to get his M.A. in Soviet Studies in 1988 at Harvard University.

In 1983 Kramer and his parents traveled to the Soviet Union to meet a relative who was still living in Latvia. He continued to make trips back to Latvia to visit family starting in 1992.

== Career prior to government service ==
After university, Kramer was a lecturer in Russian studies at Clark University, a teaching fellow for Adam Ulam at Harvard University, and a consultant for Arthur D. Little in Cambridge, Massachusetts. During the collapse of the Soviet Union, he was an analyst for The Christian Science Monitor Network.

In 1990 Kramer, his brother Mark Kramer, Nicholas Daniloff, Natalie Rumer, and other associates from the Russian Research Center at Harvard opened a consulting business called the Cambridge East-West Consulting Group Inc. The business did not last long, however. Kramer moved to Washington, D.C., and began working at the Center for Strategic and International Studies for Stephen Sestanovich in 1993, on Ulam's recommendation. He followed Sestanovich to the Carnegie Endowment for International Peace, becoming Associate Director of the Russian and Eurasian Program there, and setting up the Carnegie Moscow Center. Kramer then worked briefly as a Senior Fellow at the Project for the New American Century.

== Government service ==
Kramer began his government service in April 2000, when he joined the United States Department of State as Executive Director of the United States Advisory Commission on Public Diplomacy. Beginning in June 2001, he served as Special Advisor to the Under Secretary of State for Global Affairs Paula Dobriansky. Then, in October 2003, Kramer became a professional staff member for the Policy Planning Staff.

From July 2005 to March 2008, he was Deputy Assistant Secretary of State for European and Eurasian Affairs under Dan Fried. While there Kramer worked on issues related to Belarus, Moldova, Russia, Ukraine, and nonproliferation.

In 2008, President of the United States George W. Bush nominated Kramer as Assistant Secretary of State for Democracy, Human Rights, and Labor, and, after Senate confirmation, he held this office from March 21, 2008, to January 20, 2009. While there he led the resumption of the human rights dialogue with the Chinese, traveling to Beijing in May 2008. He spent much of his time at this post traveling to places like Hanoi, Vietnam, twice to Ethiopia, Azerbaijan, Armenia, and Georgia, among others.

== Post-government career ==
Kramer left his position at the State Department during the presidential transition of Barack Obama in January 2009, and became a Senior Transatlantic Fellow at the German Marshall Fund. He went on to become executive director of Freedom House on October 4, 2010.

In February 2013, Kramer caused controversy at the bicentennial North American Invitational Model United Nations, when Kramer's opening keynote speech, which was rife with incrimination of the Chinese citizenry for obsequiousness towards the Chinese government and Communist Party, incited a walkout of 300 Chinese visitors, prompting Kramer to cut the much-advertised speech short. Kramer has since pushed back on the backlash, suggesting that the Chinese students who were invited to the event are close to the Chinese political elite, and that their walkout only reinforced the point of his remarks. Later, Kramer suggested that students close to authoritarian power groups should not have been invited to an event focused on the promotion of peace and diplomacy and that the event should not have invited any Chinese or Russian participants.

On June 18, 2014 Freedom House announced that Kramer planned to resign that fall. On October 1, 2014 Freedom House announced that Mark P. Lagon would replace him in 2015. In November 2014, Kramer became the Senior Director for Human Rights and Human Freedom at the McCain Institute.

In 2016 Kramer argued that the Minsk II peace agreement should be scrapped and international sanctions on Russia maintained.

In his book, Back to Containment, published in 2017, Kramer excoriated various elder statesmen of the United States, such as Henry Kissinger, for undertaking hybrid back-channel efforts to re-approach Russia, accusing them of naivete and violation of the Logan Act. Kramer contends that these actions undermined American security vis-a-vis Russia and the region, citing Kissinger's inclusion into Myrotvorets, Ukraine's semi-official blacklist.

In 2018, he was on a list of Americans to be questioned by the Russian government.

In two separate op-eds for Politico Magazine in 2016 and 2021, Kramer called for the most edgewise brinkmanship in tailoring new policy towards Russia, especially on the domestic side. While Kramer argued in his first op-ed that all employees of Russian propaganda outlets should be expelled from the United States, his second op-ed expanded this argument in favor of expulsion of "all Russian nationals even very tangentially, indirectly connected to the Russian oligarchy or the hostile Russian state". In 2025, Kramer deepened the argument even further by arguing that all Russian nationals, even those with green cards, should be summarily expelled from the United States in order to underscore that retribution towards Russians will be "individualized, random, and indiscriminatory".

=== Leaking Steele Dossier to BuzzFeed News ===
The Steele dossier, also known as the Trump–Russia dossier, is a controversial political opposition research report written from June to December 2016, containing allegations of misconduct, conspiracy, and cooperation between Donald Trump's presidential campaign and the government of Russia prior to and during the 2016 election campaign. Many of its central allegations have been discredited, and its information was unreliable, having thin and sketchy sourcing.

In December 2016, Kramer leaked the Steele dossier to BuzzFeed News. Christopher Steele had given a copy of the dossier for Kramer to show to Senator John McCain. Steele has said that, when he learned of the leak by Kramer, he felt "deep dismay and disappointment... at learning that Mr. Kramer had seriously betrayed his trust".

=== Current positions ===
Kramer serves as a member of the board of directors of the Halifax International Security Forum and executive director of the George W. Bush Institute, as well as a member of the International Advisory Council at the Center for European Policy Analysis.

In addition, Kramer is a member of the Ukraine Today media organization's International Supervisory Council.

In 2020, Kramer, along with over 130 other former Republican national security officials, signed a statement that asserted that President Trump was unfit to serve another term, and "To that end, we are firmly convinced that it is in the best interest of our nation that Vice President Joe Biden be elected as the next President of the United States, and we will vote for him."

== See also ==
- 2018 Russia–United States Summit
- Timeline of investigations into Trump and Russia (2017)

Government offices
Preceded by Barry Lowenkron	Assistant Secretary of State for Democracy, Human Rights, and Labor; 2008–2009	Succeeded by Michael Posner
