= NYU Stern Center for Business and Human Rights =

Academic research and advocacy organization

Coordinates: 40.728989°N 73.996430°W

The NYU Stern Center for Business and Human Rights is an academic research and advocacy organization at the New York University Stern School of Business founded in March 2013. It is the first center to focus on human rights as an integral part of business education.

The Center is directed by Michael Posner, former U.S. Assistant Secretary of State for Democracy, Human Rights and Labor and board chair of the Fair Labor Association and Paul M. Barrett, deputy director of the Center, and a former editor and reporter for Bloomberg Businessweek and The Wall Street Journal.

The Center is a member of the Global Business School Network, an organization of more than 100 business schools in 50 countries, dedicated to investing in and fostering business leadership in the developing world. The network is preparing to publish a curriculum toolkit for business schools to teach human rights as a core part of business education.

== Background ==
The mission of the center is “to challenge and empower companies and future business leaders to make practical progress on human rights.”

The Center conducts academic research and offers courses covering business and human rights topics to undergraduate and MBA students. It also conducts policy advocacy aimed at changing business practices to be more respectful of human rights.

Since 2017, the Center has focused on academic research and reporting around issues of technology and democracy, including online disinformation, social media content moderation policies, and Section 230 of the 1996 Communications Decency Act. This initiative is led by Paul M. Barrett, deputy director of the Center and a former reporter for Bloomberg News.

Working with Robert F. Kennedy Human Rights and the Diverse Asset Managers Initiative, the Center convened in 2018 representatives from 13 of the largest college and university endowments in the United States to develop best practices to identify and hire diverse firms, owned by women and minorities to manage university funds. In 2020, in a letter to the president of Harvard University, Rep. Emanuel Cleaver and Rep. Joe Kennedy III called for greater transparency and efforts by the university’s investment office to hire diverse asset managers.

== Research ==
The Center conducts research across business sectors to examine how business practices influence human rights outcomes. The Center’s first major report “Business as Usual is Not an Option” was released in April 2014. The report centered on the garment industry in Bangladesh and was launched on the first anniversary of the Rana Plaza building collapse. Since then the Center conducted more studies of the readymade garment industry in Bangladesh. The Center’s research estimated more than 7,000 factories producing for the export textile market, roughly 2,000 more factories than had been previously estimated. On the fifth anniversary of the Rana Plaza tragedy, the Center reported on gaps in the steps taken by those two efforts and the government of Bangladesh, and advocated for “shared responsibility.” The Center provided testimony at a hearing about the Bangladesh RMG industry at the European Parliament. The Center also studied the garment industry in Ethiopia at Hawassa Industrial Park finding that the wages paid to workers there were among the lowest factory wages in the world. Shortly after the Center’s research was released, Ethiopia created a commission to set a minimum wage.

In March 2017, the Center’s Sarah Labowitz and Casey O’Connor released a report, “Putting the ‘S’ in ESG: Measuring Human Rights Performance for Investors,” which found major gaps in companies’ environmental, social and corporate governance (ESG) initiatives. The report recommended establishing clearer standards for socially responsible investing.

The Center has studied the treatment of migrant workers in the construction industry in Persian Gulf region including practices like charging workers exorbitant recruitment fees, employers withholding workers’ passports, mandatory overtime and crowded dormitories. This has been an ongoing human rights concern for construction projects such as 2022 FIFA World Cup in Qatar and NYU’s portal campus New York University Abu Dhabi.

=== Technology and democracy ===
“Harmful Content: The Role of Internet Platform Companies in Fighting Terrorist Incitement and Politically Motivated Disinformation,” published in November 2017, called on social media companies to address the problem of disinformation and recommended enhancing company governance, refining algorithms, and introducing more “friction” to users’ experiences. The Center published three reports on online disinformation and its impact on American society and elections: "Combating Russian Disinformation," in July 2018, "Tackling Domestic Disinformation," in March 2019 and "Disinformation and the 2020 Election," in September 2019. In June 2020, the Center published “Who Moderates the Social Media Giants? A Call to End Outsourcing.”

In September 2020, the Center published “Regulating Social Media: The Fight Over Section 230 — and Beyond”, which identifies problems with Section 230 of the Communications Decency Act—the law that regulates social media content moderation in the U.S.—and makes recommendations for amending the law. Namely, the report calls on Congress to keep Section 230 in place, while amending it to make its liability protection contingent on greater transparency and reporting from social media firms. It also recommends establishing a new federal agency to oversee and enforce Section 230 as amended.

In February 2021, the Center published “False Accusation: The Unfounded Claim that Social Media Companies Censor Conservatives,” which found that major social media platforms do not systemically suppress conservatives users’ voices online. On the contrary, it found that conservative users often gain from online platforms’ algorithmic content amplification schemes.

In September 2021, the Center published “Fueling the Fire: How Social Media Intensifies U.S. Political Polarization—And What Can Be Done About It,” which found that major social media platforms like Facebook, Twitter and YouTube drive partisan political polarization in the United States. It recommends that the social media companies, the Biden administration, and the U.S. Congress take several steps to reverse online-driven polarization.

== Advocacy ==
The Center seeks to increase respect for human rights in different sectors by participating in public debates and convening meetings and events.

== See also ==
- Michael Posner
