= Lorne Craner =

American foreign policy expert

Lorne Whitney Craner
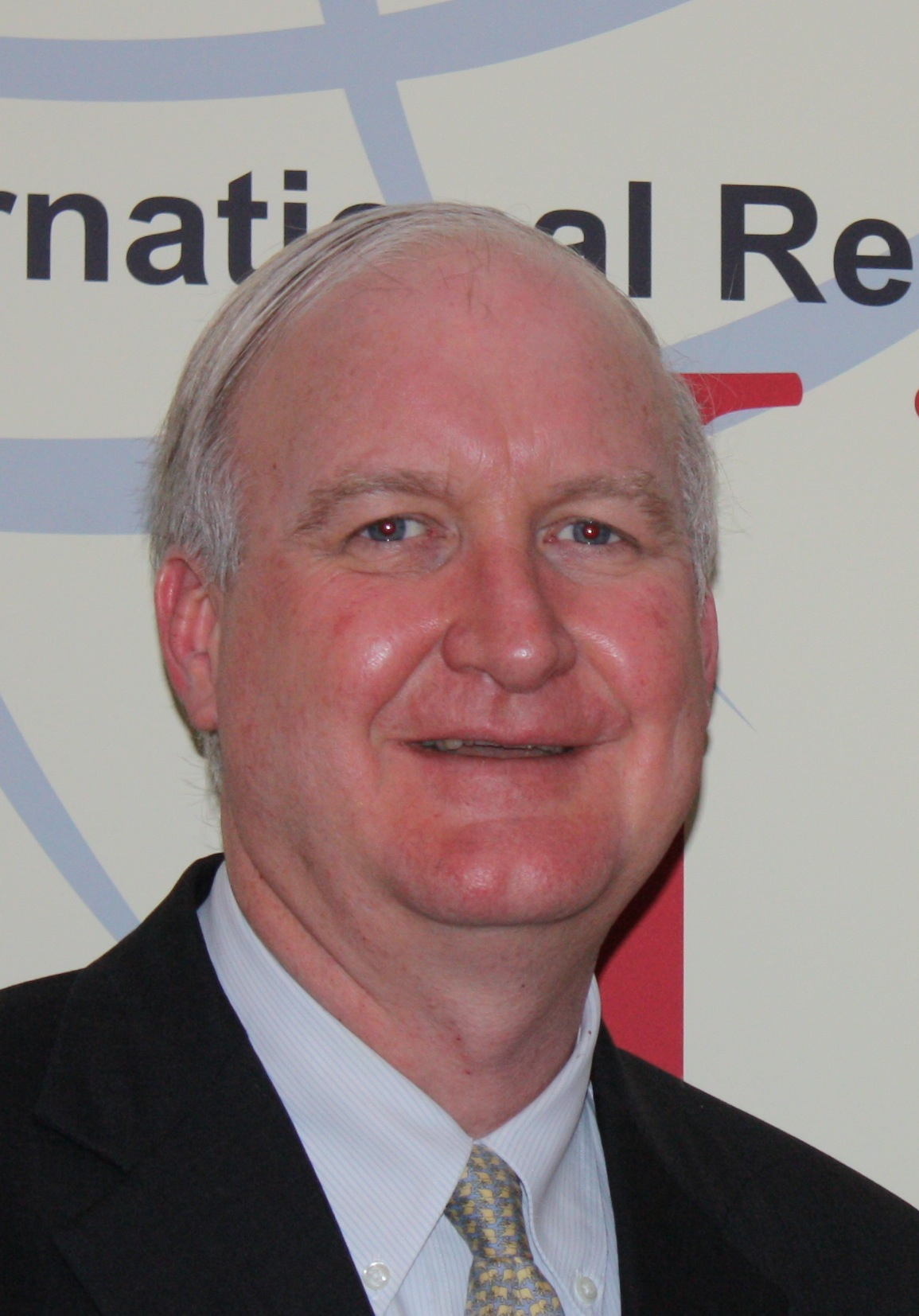
- Lorne Craner, International Republican Institute, EPP in the USA

8th Assistant Secretary of State for Democracy, Human Rights, and Labor
- In office June 4, 2001 – July 31, 2004
- President: George W. Bush
- Preceded by: Harold Hongju Koh
- Succeeded by: Barry Lowenkron

Personal details
- Born: 1959 (age 66–67)
- Party: Republican
- Education: Reed College, Georgetown University
- Occupation: Board Member, American Academy of Diplomacy and the Institute for War and Peace Reporting

Lorne Whitney Craner (April 16, 1959 – July 2, 2020) was an American foreign policy expert who served in key diplomatic and policymaking roles in three different presidential administrations. He also served as president of three major non-governmental organizations.

== Life and career ==
=== Early life ===
Craner was born at Bitburg Air Force Base in Germany. He attended University College School in London and graduated from Phillips Exeter Academy. Craner received a BA from Reed College and an MA in National Security Studies from Georgetown University. His father Robert received three Silver Stars as a US Air Force pilot and prisoner of war in Vietnam and his mother Audrey was awarded graduate degrees from the Fletcher School and Georgetown University.

=== Career ===
In the 1980s Craner worked on foreign policy issues in the US House of Representatives for Congressman Jim Kolbe and in the Senate for Senator John McCain. In 1989 he became a Deputy Assistant Secretary of State for Legislative Affairs and in 1992 a director of Asian affairs at the White House National Security Council in the George HW Bush administration. From 1993-2001 he was vice president, then president of the International Republican Institute (IRI) a democracy assistance NGO. He returned to government as Assistant Secretary for Democracy, Human Rights and Labor under Secretary of State Colin Powell. His work in the Middle East, Central Asia and China after the 9/11 attacks drew praise from President Bush Amnesty International and Human Rights Watch and Craner received the State Department’s Distinguished Service Award from Secretary Powell. Craner returned to the IRI as President from 2004-2014. He served two terms on the Board of the Millennium Challenge Corporation and consulted on US-European relations and on political risk in Asia and the Middle East, before serving as President of the American Councils for International Education from 2017 to 2019.

Government offices
Preceded by Harold Hongju Koh	Assistant Secretary of State for Democracy, Human Rights, and Labor; June 4, 2001 – July 31, 2004	Succeeded by Barry Lowenkron
