= Patricia Diaz Dennis =

American lawyer

5th Assistant Secretary of State for Human Rights and Humanitarian Affairs
- In office August 24, 1992 – January 20, 1993
- President: George H. W. Bush
- Preceded by: Richard Schifter
- Succeeded by: John Shattuck

Commissioner of the Federal Communications Commission
- In office June 25, 1986 - September 29, 1989
- President: Ronald Reagan
- Preceded by: Henry M. Rivera
- Succeeded by: Ervin Duggan

Member of the National Labor Relations Board
- In office May 5, 1983 – June 24, 1986
- President: Ronald Reagan
- Preceded by: John Van de Water
- Succeeded by: Mary Cracraft

Personal details
- Born: Patricia Diaz; October 2, 1946 (age 79) Santa Rita, New Mexico, U.S.
- Spouse: Michael Dennis
- Education: University of California, Los Angeles (BA); Loyola Marymount University (JD)

Patricia Diaz Dennis (born October 2, 1946) is an American lawyer who served as Assistant Secretary of State for Human Rights and Humanitarian Affairs from 1992 to 1993.

== Biography ==
Patricia Diaz Dennis was born in Santa Rita, New Mexico on October 2, 1946, the daughter of Porfirio Madrid Diaz and Mary Romero. She attended the University of California, Los Angeles, graduating with an A.B. in English in 1970. She then attended Loyola Law School and received a J.D. in 1973.

After law school, she joined Paul, Hastings, Janofsky & Walker as an associate attorney. She practiced labor and employment law there until 1976, when she took an in-house job in the law department of the Pacific Lighting Company. In 1978, she joined the labor law department of the American Broadcasting Company.

In 1983, President Ronald Reagan appointed Dennis to the National Labor Relations Board. After Senate confirmation, she served there until 1986, when Reagan appointed her as a commissioner on the Federal Communications Commission, also requiring Senate confirmation.

She returned to the private practice of law in 1991, joining Jones Day as a partner and Chair of the Communications Section.

From 1991 to 1992, she served as vice president, Government Affairs at Sprint. In August 1992, President George H. W. Bush nominated Dennis to be Assistant Secretary of State for Human Rights and Humanitarian Affairs and, after Senate confirmation, Dennis held this position from August 24, 1992, until January 20, 1993.

Upon leaving the United States Department of State, Dennis joined Sullivan & Cromwell as special counsel for telecommunications matters. She joined SBC Communications (which later became AT&T) as a senior vice president in 1995, and worked there until retiring 2008.

In addition to her career, Dennis served on the World Bank Sanctions Board from 2007 to 2013 as the first Latina and second female to serve on the Board.

Dennis has served on five public boards, two private boards, and one mutual board as well.

Long active in the Girl Scouts of the USA among many non-profits, in 2005, Dennis was elected as that organization's chairperson, substantially increasing the number of Latina children to join the Girl Scouts.

As of 2023, she chairs the Sanctions Panel for The Global Fund which fights AIDS, malaria, and tuberculosis around the world.

Government offices
Preceded by Richard Schifter	Assistant Secretary of State for Democracy, Human Rights, and Labor; 1992–1993	Succeeded by John Shattuck
