= Richard Schifter =

American politician (1923–2020)

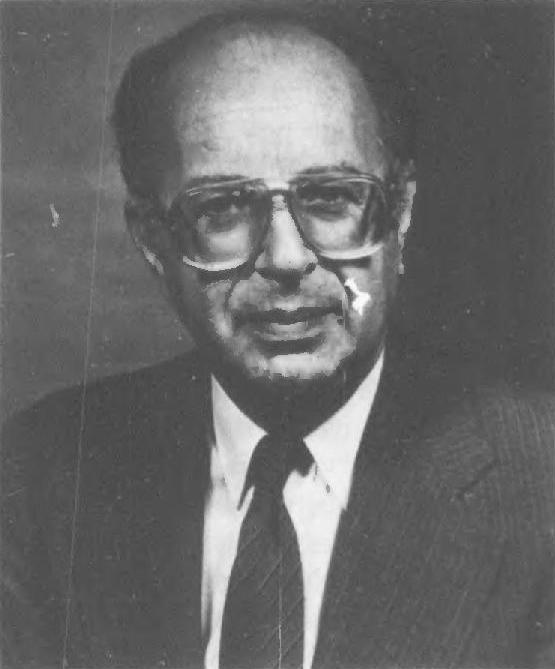

4th Assistant Secretary of State for Human Rights and Humanitarian Affairs
- In office October 31, 1985 – April 3, 1992
- President: Ronald Reagan; George H. W. Bush
- Preceded by: Elliott Abrams
- Succeeded by: Patricia Diaz Dennis

Personal details
- Born: July 31, 1923 Vienna, Austria
- Died: October 4, 2020 (aged 97)
- Education: City College of New York (BA); Yale University (LL.B)

Military service
- Branch/service: United States Army
- Unit: Ritchie Boys
- Battles/wars: World War II

Richard Schifter (July 31, 1923 – October 4, 2020) was an Austrian-American attorney and diplomat who served as Assistant Secretary of State for Human Rights and Humanitarian Affairs from 1985 to 1992.

== Early life and education ==
Richard Schifter was born in Vienna, Austria, on July 31, 1923, into a Jewish family from Poland. In the wake of the Anschluss by which the First Austrian Republic was annexed by Nazi Germany, Schifter's family sought permission for all of them to emigrate to the United States, but Richard was the only member of the family able to obtain a visa. His parents, who had been born in Poland, were in the Polish quota, and placed on a long waiting list. He immigrated to the United States without his family in December 1938, at the age of 15. In the U.S., he earned a Bachelor of Arts degree from the College of the City of New York in 1943.

Schifter enrolled in Yale Law School in 1948, receiving his LL.B. in 1951.

=== Military service ===
Schifter joined the United States Army in 1943, becoming one of the Ritchie Boys, a unit of, among others, young Jewish-German refugees who the U.S. Army trained in psychological warfare.

He was present for the Normandy landings and did intelligence work in the field. After the Battle of the Bulge, he was stationed in Aachen and tasked with interviewing the civilian population, thus producing one of the first studies of daily life under the Third Reich. He searched for his family after the war, but they had all been killed in the Holocaust. He was discharged from the Army in 1946, but stayed in Allied-occupied Germany working for the U.S. military government as a civilian until 1948.

== Career ==
After graduating from law school, Schifter joined the law firm of Riegelman, Strasser, Schwarz & Spiegelberg (now Fried, Frank, Harris, Shriver & Jacobson). Following the death of Felix S. Cohen in 1953, Schifter, along with fellow attorney Arthur Lazarus, Jr., became the main attorneys for the Oglala Sioux Tribe of the Pine Ridge Reservation in their repeated disputes with the United States government. Schifter practiced law at Fried, Frank until the 1980s, as one of the foremost practitioners of federal Indian law in the country. He also served on the President's Task Force on American Indians from 1966 to 1967.

From 1981 to 1982, Schifter was U.S. representative to the UNESCO Committee on Conventions and Recommendations. He was also an alternate U.S. representative to the United Nations Commission on Human Rights 1981 to 1982. From 1983 to 1985, he was the United States representative to the United Nations Commission on Human Rights. He was also the United States deputy representative to the United Nations Security Council with the rank of ambassador from 1984 to 1985.

In 1985, President of the United States Ronald Reagan nominated Schifter to be Assistant Secretary of State for Human Rights and Humanitarian Affairs. After Senate Confirmation, Schifter served as Assistant Secretary of State for Human Rights and Humanitarian Affairs from October 31, 1985, until April 3, 1992. Schifter's views on U.S. foreign policy have been described as neoconservative.

After the election of Bill Clinton, he was appointed to special assistant to the United States National Security Council. He served in this capacity until 2001.

Since leaving government in 2001, Schifter headed the American Jewish International Relations Institute and the Center for Democracy and Reconciliation in Southeastern Europe. He was also a trustee of the Institute for Christian and Jewish Studies.

== Personal life ==
Schifter died on October 4, 2020.

Government offices
Preceded by Elliott Abrams	Assistant Secretary of State for Human Rights and Humanitarian Affairs; October 31, 1985 – April 3, 1992	Succeeded by Patricia Diaz Dennis
