= Michael Posner (lawyer) =

American lawyer

Michael H. Posner
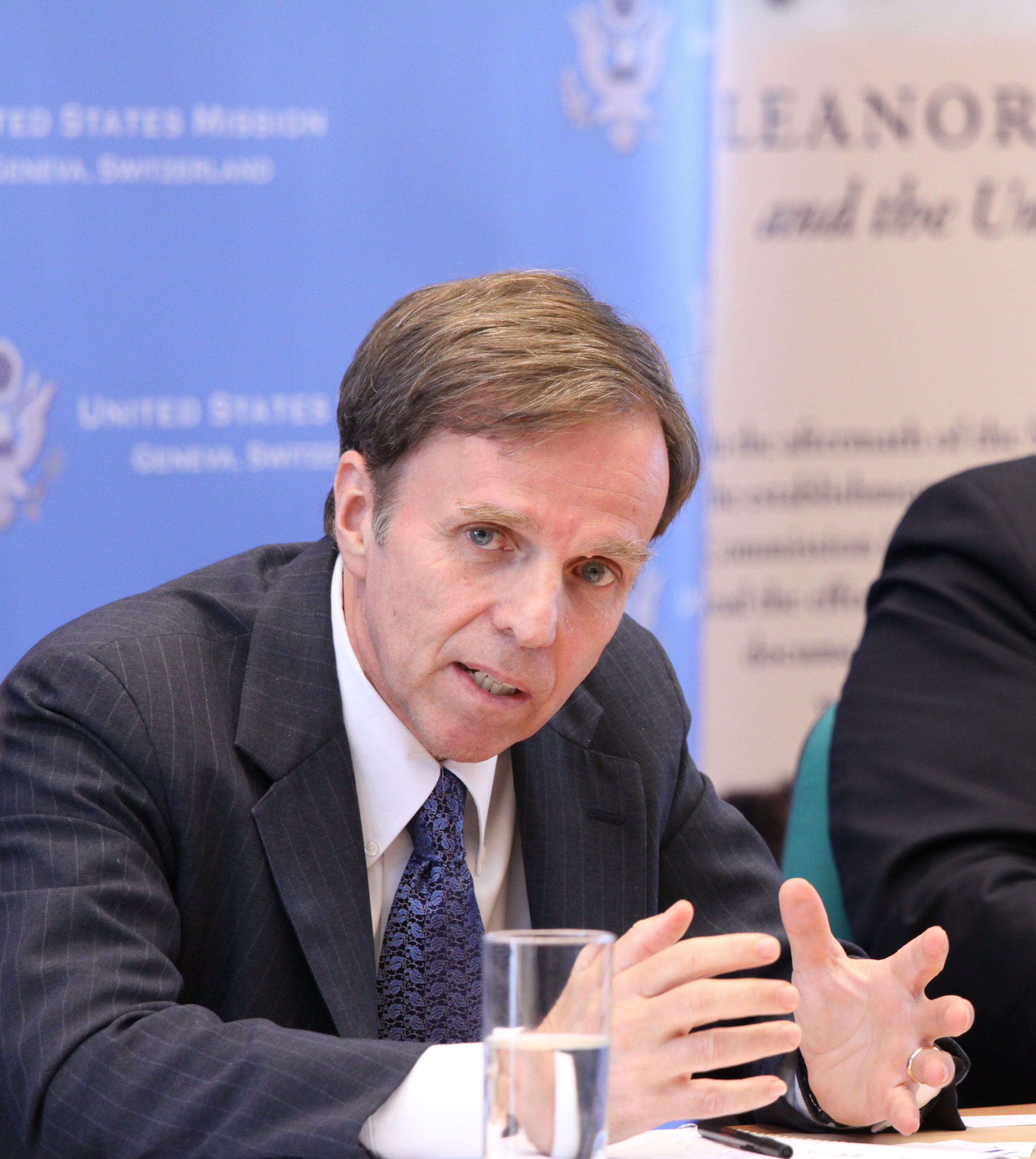

11th Assistant Secretary of State for Democracy, Human Rights, and Labor
- In office September 23, 2009 – March 8, 2013
- President: Barack Obama
- Preceded by: David J. Kramer
- Succeeded by: Tom Malinowski

Personal details
- Born: November 19, 1950 (age 75) Chicago, Illinois, U.S.
- Education: University of Michigan (BA); University of California, Berkeley (JD)
- Occupation: Co-Director for the Center of Business and Human Rights at New York University Stern School of Business

Michael H. Posner (/ˈpoʊznər/; born November 19, 1950) is an American lawyer, the Founding Executive Director and later the President of Human Rights First (formerly the Lawyers Committee for Human Rights), the former Assistant Secretary of State for Democracy, Human Rights, and Labor (DRL) of the United States, currently director for the Center of Business and Human Rights at NYU Stern School of Business, as well as Professor of Business and Society at New York University Stern School of Business, and a board member of the International Service for Human Rights.

== Early life and education ==
Posner was born in Chicago, Illinois. He received a B.A. from the University of Michigan. He received his J.D. from the University of California, Berkeley Law School (Boalt Hall). After graduating, Posner spent a year documenting atrocities committed in Uganda. His work in Geneva with the United Nations and International Commission of Jurists earned him a reputation as a human-rights advocate.

== Human Rights First ==
In 1978, Posner was recruited by Jerome Shestack and James Silkenat to become the founding executive director of the Lawyers Committee for International Human Rights, a non-profit, nonpartisan international human rights organization with offices in New York and Washington, D.C. that works on a range of domestic and international human rights issues. He focused on refugee protection, advancing a rights-based approach to national security and combating discrimination. The organization was renamed to the Lawyers Committee for Human Rights and, in 2003, renamed again to Human Rights First. In his role, Posner built the organization from a staff of two, a few volunteers and a budget of $55,000 to its current staff of 60 and an annual budget of almost $9 million.

=== Torture Victim Protection Act ===
Posner has also focused efforts to strengthen systems of accountability in countries where human rights violations occur, especially for crimes like torture, genocide, crimes against humanity, and war crimes. He proposed, drafted, and campaigned for the Torture Victim Protection Act (TVPA), which was adopted by Congress and signed into law in 1992.

=== WITNESS ===
Also in 1992, Posner helped musician/activist Peter Gabriel found WITNESS, an organization that uses video and online technologies to shed light on human rights violations around the world. In its first few years, WITNESS was based at Human Rights First. WITNESS has since received numerous awards for their work including, the National Academy of Television Arts and Sciences Humanitarian Award and The New York Times Company Nonprofit Excellence Award.

=== Role in the International Justice System and the International Criminal Court (ICC) ===
In 1998, Posner led the Human Rights First delegation to the Rome conference at which the statute of the International Criminal Court (ICC) was adopted.

=== McCain Amendment / End Torture Now Campaign ===
Human Rights First launched its End Torture Now campaign in 2004. Posner and Human Rights First led the advocacy efforts in support of the McCain Amendment which bans U.S. soldiers and officials from engaging in cruel, inhuman, or degrading treatment. The amendment won broad bipartisan congressional support and was signed into law in December 2005.

== Academic career ==
Posner lectured at Columbia Law School between 1984 and 2008. He is the Jerome Kohlberg Professor of Ethics and Finance at NYU's Stern School of Business, in addition to serving as director of the Center for Business and Human Rights at the school. He has also taught at the New York Law School.

In 2019, he delivered the Jacob K. Javits Visiting Professorship Lecture at NYU. In his remarks, he said, "We see growing opportunities for business schools, and the future business leaders we teach, to play key roles in building responsible global supply chains, an investment system that promotes greater economic equality, and well-managed social media platforms that advance democratic discourse."

== Human rights advocacy ==
Posner has testified dozens of times before the U.S. Congress on a wide range of human rights topics including the protection of refugees, anti-Semitism, human rights within the business community and human rights violations in the Philippines, China, Northern Ireland, Uganda, El Salvador and many other countries. He is a frequent public commentator on these and other issues, regularly speaking at conferences and events in the United States and abroad. His opinion essays have appeared in publications including the Boston Globe, Jerusalem Post Washington Post, The New York Times and Forbes.

== NYU Stern Center for Business and Human Rights ==
Posner is director of the Stern Center for Business and Human Rights and a clinical professor of business and society at Stern School of Business at New York University. It is the first center to focus on human rights as part of a business school. In the summer of 2015, Posner was named the Jerome Kohlberg Professor of Ethics & Finance at the Stern Center for Business and Human Rights, an endowed chairmanship position.

In April 2014 the center put out a report on the garment industry in Bangladesh, where the catastrophic collapse of a garment factory building killed more than 1,100 people in April 2013. The report cited the common practice of indirect sourcing as a major risk factor in the safety of garment factories. The center has published three subsequent reports on the garment industry in Bangladesh.

=== Technology and democracy ===
Led by its deputy director, Paul M. Barrett, the center has published a number of in-depth reports on technology policy and social media's impacts on politics in the United States and abroad. Its first report on this topic, "Harmful Content: The Role of Internet Platform Companies in Fighting Terrorist Incitement and Politically Motivated Disinformation," was published in November 2017 and called on social media companies to address the problem of disinformation by enhancing company governance, refining algorithms, and introducing more "friction" to users' experiences.

From July 2018 to September 2019, the center published three reports on online disinformation and its impact on American society and elections, the first dealing with Russian disinformation campaigns; the second with domestically generated disinformation; and the third on the impact of disinformation on the 2020 U.S. presidential election.

In June 2020, the center published "Who Moderates the Social Media Giants? A Call to End Outsourcing," which identifies problems with content moderation practices employed by major social media companies like Facebook and Twitter. These include: lack of sufficient mental health services for moderators, insufficient content moderation in developing countries experiencing ethnic violence fueled by social media, and substandard working conditions for moderators.

In September 2020, the center published "Regulating Social Media: The Fight Over Section 230 — and Beyond", which identifies problems with Section 230 of the Communications Decency Act—the law that regulates social media content moderation in the U.S.—and makes recommendations for amending the law. Namely, the report calls on Congress to keep Section 230 in place, while amending it to make its liability protection contingent on greater transparency and reporting from social media firms. It also recommends establishing a new federal agency to oversee and enforce Section 230 as amended.

In February 2021, the center published "False Accusation: The Unfounded Claim that Social Media Companies Censor Conservatives," which found that major social media platforms do not systemically suppress conservative users' voices online. On the contrary, it found that conservative users often gain from online platforms' algorithmic content amplification schemes.

In September 2021, the center published "Fueling the Fire: How Social Media Intensifies U.S. Political Polarization—And What Can Be Done About It," which found that major social media platforms like Facebook, Twitter and YouTube drive partisan political polarization in the United States. It recommends that the social media companies, the Biden administration, and the US Congress take several steps to reverse online-driven polarization.

=== Human rights in international supply chains ===
During Posner's tenure, the center has studied the treatment of migrant workers in the construction industry in Persian Gulf region, including practices like charging workers exorbitant recruitment fees, employers withholding workers' passports, mandatory overtime and crowded dormitories. This has been an ongoing human rights concern for construction projects like the 2022 FIFA World Cup in Qatar and NYU's portal campus NYU Abu Dhabi.

In May 2019, the center released a report entitled "Made in Ethiopia: Challenges in the Garment Industry's New Frontier," which identified worker abuses in Ethiopia's growing garment manufacturing sector, including the lowest wages paid in any garment-producing country. For the report, the center's deputy director, Paul Barrett, traveled to the Hawassa Industrial Park in Awassa, Ethiopia, documenting conditions on the ground. The report's publication contributed to the Ethiopian government's announcement in 2019 that it would review the country's wage policies in the sector.

In September 2020, Dorothée Baumann-Pauly, director of Geneva Center for Business and Human Rights and the research director at the NYU Stern Center for Business and Human Rights, produced a report entitled "Making Mining Safe and Fair: Artisanal Cobalt Extraction in the Democratic Republic of the Congo," published by the World Economic Forum. The report recommends "formalizing" cobalt-mining processes in the Democratic Republic of the Congo's artisanal and small-scale mines—from which significant quantities of raw materials are sourced for electric vehicles sold in the West—in order to prevent human rights abuses.

In September 2020, the center released a report by one of its fellows, Isabelle Glimcher, entitled "Purchasing Power: How the U.S. Government Can Use Federal Procurement to Uphold Human Rights." The report recommended best practices for identifying and eliminating unfair labor practices in the supply chains of government contractors doing business with the U.S. federal government.

In October 2021, the center released "Making ESG Work: How Investors Can Help Improve Low-Wage Labor and Ease Income Inequality," which examined the field of ESG investing—environmental, social and governance—and recommended that asset owners and managers take steps to better measure social factors in their investment portfolios. That same month, in partnership with the Geneva Center for Business and Human Rights, the center also released "Seeking a 'Smart Mix': Multi-Stakeholder Initiatives and Mandatory Human Rights Due Diligence," which recommended that governments partner with multi-stakeholder initiatives (MSIs) to pass mandatory human rights due diligence (mHRDD) legislation.

== Obama Administration ==
On July 7, 2009, President Barack Obama announced his intent to nominate Posner to serve in the State Department as Assistant Secretary of State for Democracy, Human Rights, and Labor. He was named to the position on September 23, 2009.

=== Confirmation ===
In his statement as the nominee for Assistant Secretary of State Bureau of Democracy, Human Rights and Labor before the Senate Foreign Relations Committee on July 28, 2009, Posner affirmed that

[s}ince the late 1970s, I often have looked to the U.S. government as a key ally in the struggle to protect human rights around the world. As a non-governmental advocate, I have witnessed and often benefited from the incredible power and moral authority of the United States to lead on these important but often complicated issues. The U.S. government's potential to provide leadership on human rights democracy and the rule of law is part of what Secretary Clinton has referred to as the smart power.

Posner later recalled the personal lessons of the Holocaust that helped shape his vocation as a human rights advocate. Posner was raised with a consciousness of the horrors of the Holocaust and "internalized two important lessons. The first is that governments that fall into the hands of dictators and demagogues are capable of unspeakable brutality and horror. The second, more hopeful lesson is that courageous people can and often do stand up to oppression and it is our duty to help them".

During his testimony, Posner gave a brief synopsis of his previous involvement with the U.S. government in their mutual effort to promote and protect human rights. His first appearance before the Senate was in 1978 when Posner testified before the Senate Foreign Relations Committee regarding the trade sanctions against Idi Amin's Uganda. Posner commented that "this was the first of many instances where I have seen and been part of efforts to harness the political, diplomatic and economic power of the United States Government as a force for good". Congress passed a total ban on trade with Uganda and the people regained control of their country within the year. He went on to describe other shared successes including "the work we did with Andrei Sakharov and other dissidents in the former Soviet Union, especially through the Helsinki process. I experienced it in the 1980s when President Reagan stood behind Philippine "people's power" and ensured a successful transition of power from Marcos to Aquino. I saw it in Northern Ireland where George Mitchell and the Clinton Administration provided a roadmap for peace through the Good Friday Agreement. And I witnessed it as the Bush Administration, working closely with Congressional leaders like Senators Cardin and Voinovich and Congressman Chris Smith, took a leading role in challenging European anti-Semitism and other racial and religious persecution through the Organization for Security and Cooperation in Europe".

Posner closed with an affirmation that "[t]he promotion of democracy and human rights here, and around the world, helps define us – and who we are as a people".

Posner's confirmation by the 111th Congress was welcomed by the international human rights community. Amnesty International USA Executive Director Larry Cox issued the following statement: "Michael has been a brilliant advocate on behalf of protecting the rights and dignity of people the world over. At this time of great opportunity to advance the rights of those whose freedoms are denied, it is invaluable to have an advocate of Michael's accomplishment in this role", said Cox. "Amnesty International looks forward to continuing to work with now-Secretary Posner on crucial issues concerning the global protection of human rights for all people".

At his Swearing-in Ceremony at the State Department, Secretary of State Hillary Rodham Clinton commented that "as soon as [his confirmation] was completed, literally, he was on a plane, going to lead the first ever U.S. delegation to the UN Human Rights Council. Our team there under Mike's leadership not only made significant progress on women's rights and human security issues, but co-sponsored a successful resolution with Egypt upholding freedom of expression and freedom of religion. And Mike went on to Warsaw to present the Obama Administration's proposal for advancing the "Human Dimension" of the Helsinki process. I think I only talked to him two times during that period, because I had great confidence that he would indeed be successful as we rejoined the Human Rights Council and it exceeded our expectations".

=== U.S.-China Human Rights Dialogue ===
In May 2010, Posner was a key negotiator in a "U.S.-China Human Rights Dialogue" in Washington, D.C. On May 14, Posner gave the press conference after the event, where he described the U.S. approach to the meeting as, "Part of a mature relationship is that you have an open discussion where you not only raise the other guy's problems, but you raise your own." To that end, he said the American side had brought up the United States' "treatment of Muslim Americans", as well as Arizona's recently passed Support Our Law Enforcement and Safe Neighborhoods Act, which Posner said had been brought up "early and often", "as a troubling trend in our society".

Posner's comments proved controversial in the United States. Arizona's two senators, Republicans Jon Kyl and John McCain, wrote an open letter to Posner that stated, "To compare in any way the lawful and democratic act of the government of the state of Arizona with the arbitrary abuses of the unelected Chinese Communist Party is inappropriate and offensive", and called for a retraction and apology. The conservative New York Post called the comments "misguided moral equivalence" and "despicable", citing China's treatment of its own Muslim population, the Uyghurs, as well as its policy of sending back refugees who arrive from North Korea, "where certain, agonizing death awaits them".

The State Department defended Posner's actions. Spokesman P. J. Crowley disputed the notion Posner was apologizing to China when he was actually "standing up" for America by demonstrating how debate works in a "civil society". Crowley also reiterated the Obama administration's concerns about the Arizona law, stating, "There is, as many have said, real concerns about -- that this Arizona law will inevitably devolve into racial profiling. That would be a fundamental challenge to human rights around the world".

=== Internet freedom ===
As Assistant Secretary of State, Posner has played a leading role in implementing Secretary Clinton's vision for Internet freedom. In testimony before the Senate Judiciary Human Rights and the Law Subcommittee in March 2010, Posner said, "the defense of a free, open and interconnected Internet is in our national and global interests and is important for commerce, for diplomatic and political relations, and for building sustainable democratic societies." Posner frequently speaks on the topic of Internet freedom and the role of the Internet in advancing human rights and helping people build sustainable democracies.

Under Posner's leadership, the Bureau of Democracy, Human Rights, and Labor has played a leading role in supporting democratic activists in their use of new technologies, particularly in the Middle East. Posner led efforts described as "uncharacteristically cool" to fund millions of dollars in technology development meant to aid pro-democracy activists around the world. In describing a "panic button" designed to allow pro-democracy campaigners wipe out their phones' address books and emit emergency signals to other activists, Posner said, "We're operating like venture capitalists. We are looking for the most innovative people who are going to tailor their technology and their expertise to the particular community of people we're trying to protect." Digital activists commended Posner's bureau in this approach in an open letter to Congress in March 2011, saying, "The State Department, and particularly the Bureau of Democracy, Human Rights and Labor (DRL), has taken significant interest in supporting technologies that enhance Internet freedom, and reached out to leading organizations in a collaborative and open approach".

=== Strategic dialogues ===
Posner has participated in more than a dozen strategic dialogues since joining the State Department. Both Secretary Clinton and Posner have placed great emphasis on building partnerships beyond the state, and giving civil society a stronger voice in shaping the political decision-making process. In her July 2010 speech in Kraków, Poland, Secretary Clinton said, "markets and politics usually receive more attention. But civil society is every bit as important. And it undergirds both democratic governance and broad-based prosperity". In February 2010, Posner and Secretary Clinton launched a Strategic Dialogue with Civil Society, an endeavor to help streamline and strengthen dialogue with non-governmental organizations and other members of civil society. Clinton and Posner engaged in a town hall style discussion with over fifty civil society representatives, domestically and internationally.

In the summer of 2010, Posner participated in the U.S.-Russia Civil Society Working Group of the Bilateral Commission, which focused on prisons and migration, as well as the Civil Society to Civil Society Summit, where Secretary Clinton told participants "we need creative, committed, courageous organizations like you and yours to find innovative solutions, to expose corruption, to give voice to the voiceless, to hold governments accountable to their citizens, to keep people informed and engaged on the issues that matter most to them".

=== Economic and social rights ===
Posner has been a vocal proponent of the Obama Administration's integrated approach to human rights and the inexorable relationship between national security and economic, social, and political rights. On March 24, Posner delivered a keynote address, "The Four Freedoms Turn 70: Ensuring Economic, Political, and National Security in the 21st Century", at the American Society of International Law. The speech took place on the anniversary of Franklin Delano Roosevelt's famous Four Freedom speech. Posner's speech re-examined the Four Freedoms, or "moral cornerstones", and discussed the important intersection between political and economic rights, which he said are "inexorably linked". According to Posner, "Human dignity has a political component and an economic component". Posner highlighted the turmoil in the Middle East as evidence that the shaping of U.S. national security must include the promotion of human rights and fundamental freedoms, and that only if the two are interlinked will peaceful societies flourish economically, socially, and politically. The unrest in the Middle East, according to Posner, "once again demonstrates the fallacy of trying to divide America's "hard" strategic interests from our "soft" interests, including our commitment to human rights". Posner stated, "The recent protests demonstrate the centrality of human rights to those interests and the links among civil, political, economic and social rights".

=== Voluntary Principles ===
Since March 2010, Posner has been involved in the Voluntary Principles on Security and Human Rights. Established in 2000 (the United States is a founding member), the Voluntary Principles—an initiative by governments, NGOs, and companies—provides guidance to extractives companies on maintaining the safety and security of their operations within a framework that ensures respect for human rights and fundamental freedoms. The Voluntary Principles are the only human rights guidelines designed specifically for oil, gas, and mining companies. On March 22 and 23, 2011, Posner chaired the 11th annual Voluntary Principles on Security and Human Rights Plenary Meeting in Washington, a multi-stakeholder forum where human rights issues in the extractives sector, particularly in areas of conflict and civil strife, were addressed. Posner also participated in the Annual Plenary Meeting in London in March 2010 and in Ottawa in March 2012. Later in May and November 2012, Posner travelled to Libya and Nigeria respectively to conduct multi-stakeholder meetings regarding implementation of the VPs. Currently there are seven governments, 20 companies, 12 NGOs, and four observers participating in the Voluntary Principles.

=== Human Rights Reports ===
Posner has been actively engaged in reporting on global human rights situations through the State Department's annual Human Rights Reports, which are submitted to Congress by the Department of State in compliance with Sections 116(d) and 502B(b) of the Foreign Assistance Act of 1961 (FAA), as amended. The report offers a comprehensive record of human rights situations of almost 200 countries and territories worldwide, and uses information from nongovernmental and international organizations, U.S. embassies and consulates, and other sources. At the 2010 Human Rights Report roll-out in April 2011, Posner called it "the single most comprehensive report on human rights produced by anybody in the world—194 countries, 2,200,000 words, 7,000 pages". That year's report was viewed by more than one million people.

Posner highlighted three trends identified in the 2010 report:

- Ongoing conflicts that continue to disproportionately affect vulnerable populations
- Greater access to connective technologies that has helped to both promote human rights, "but also has given governments greater energy in curtailing freedom of expression"
- The "use and misuse of national security legislation and emergency legislation to apply broad curtailments on basic civil liberties"

The following year, at the rollout of the 2011 Human Rights report, Posner emphasized two worrying trends:

- "Flawed elections, restrictions on physical and internet freedom, media censorship, attempts to restrict the activities of civil society groups"
- "Increasing persecution of many religious groups, including the Ahmadis, the Baháʼí, Tibetan Buddhists, Jews, and Christians" as well as "racial and ethnic minorities, people with disabilities, women, and the LGBT community, which continue to face criminalization and violence in many countries"

The 2011 report was designed to be more concise, focused and user-friendly.

=== Universal Periodic Review ===
Posner has been a proponent of the Universal Periodic Review (UPR), established by the UN General Assembly in 2006 as a process through which the human rights records of the United Nations' 193 Member States is reviewed and assessed. In November 2010, Posner traveled to Geneva as one of three co-heads of the 32-person interagency U.S. government delegation submitting the United States' first report through the UPR to the UN Human Rights Council. Speaking of the UPR at a press conference at the Foreign Press Center in April 2011, Posner stated, "We are very open to the notion that people in this country have not only a right but are well open to be critical of what we do, and we engage them in that criticism". During the week of the UPR hearing, Posner defended the United States' engagement with the UN Human Rights Council against domestic criticism, saying "this is what principled engagement looks like". He reiterated the Obama administration's stance that there was no room for torture or cruel treatment of detainees in U.S. policy: "We're not mincing words. We're not winking and nodding", he said. "The prohibition against torture and cruel treatment applies to every U.S. official, every agency, everywhere in the world. There is an absolute prohibition as a matter of law and policy".

=== International religious freedom ===
Since being sworn in as Assistant Secretary, Posner has engaged on a number of fronts promoting religious freedom, particularly in the Middle East and South Central Asia. Following the release of the 2009 International Religious Freedom Report, Posner discussed religious freedom issues in the Middle East before the House Foreign Affairs Committee Subcommittee on the Middle East and South Asia. Said Posner, "Religion is a global phenomenon and all nations, including the United States, wrestle with how best to accommodate their religious diversity. We are convinced that the freedom to profess, practice, and promote one's religion is a basic human right, a social good, a source of stability, and a key component of international security". Posner has engaged on international religious freedom issues in meetings with Egyptian Coptic Christians, Chinese religious freedom advocates, Vietnamese, Pakistani, and Afghan officials, and others since being sworn in as Assistant Secretary.

== Other organizations ==
As a member of the White House Apparel Industry Partnership Task Force, Posner helped found the Fair Labor Association (FLA) in 1997, a multi-stakeholder initiative between apparel and footwear companies, universities and non-governmental organizations aimed at protecting the rights of workers in the apparel industry's global supply chain. He sat on the FLA's board of directors until 2009. Beginning in 2006, Posner worked on another multi-stakeholder initiative called the Global Network Initiative (GNI), which was launched in October 2008. He also served on the board of the Robert F. Kennedy Memorial Center for Human Rights until 2009. He was appointed to the board of the International Service for Human Rights in 2014.

== Honorary degrees and awards ==
Posner has received honorary degrees from the University of Pennsylvania. He is also the recipient of the Fellows Award for distinguished service, Young Lawyers of the American Bar Association (1990); the Distinguished Service Award, Boalt Hall Alumni Association (1993); the Wolfgang Friedmann Memorial Award for outstanding contributions to the field of international law, Columbia University Journal of Transnational Law (1993); the Dr. Jean Mayer Global Citizenship Award, Institute for Global Leadership at Tufts University (2006); and the Builders of the New New York Award, New York Immigration Coalition (2007).

Government offices
Preceded by David J. Kramer	Assistant Secretary of State for Democracy, Human Rights, and Labor; September 23, 2009 – March 8, 2013	Succeeded by Tom Malinowski
