= Sally Terry =

American political science professor (born 1937)

Sarah “Sally” Meiklejohn Terry (born 1937) was a political science professor at Tufts University beginning in the fall of 1975 until her retirement on December 31, 2002.

== Biography ==
A native of Newton, Massachusetts, Terry graduated with a BA from Cornell University (Phi Beta Kappa and Phi Kappa Phi). She went on to receive her M.A. and a Ph.D. from Harvard University in Soviet Studies and Political Science, respectively.

== Bibliography ==
- Poland’s Place in Europe: General Sikorski and the Origin of the Oder-Neisse Line, 1939-1943 (Princeton University Press, 1983) won the American Historical Association's George Louis Beer Prize in Modern European International History
- Terry has edited and contributed to Soviet Policy in Eastern Europe (Yale University Press, 1984) and co-edited and contributed to The Soviet Empire Reconsidered: Essays in Honor of Adam B. Ulam (Westview Press, 1994)
