= Henry M. Rivera =

American attorney

Commissioner of the Federal Communications Commission
- In office August 10, 1981 – September 15, 1985
- President: Ronald Reagan
- Preceded by: James Henry Quello
- Succeeded by: Patricia Diaz Dennis

Personal details
- Born: September 25, 1946 (age 78); Albuquerque, New Mexico
- Political party: Democratic

Henry M. Rivera (born September 25, 1946) is an American attorney who served as a Commissioner of the Federal Communications Commission from 1981 to 1985. Rivera was the first Hispanic person to hold the office of FCC Commissioner. Rivera is currently a partner at Wiley Rein LLP.
