= Patricia Derian =

American activist (1929–2016)

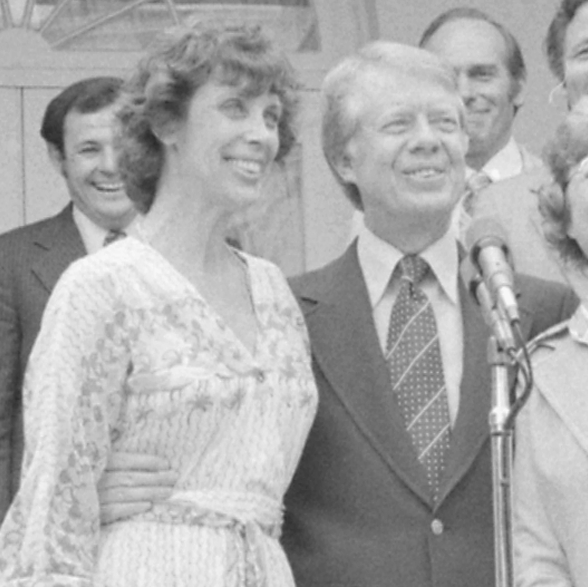
- Derian and President Jimmy Carter, 1977

2nd Assistant Secretary of State for Human Rights and Humanitarian Affairs
- In office August 17, 1977 – January 19, 1981
- Preceded by: James M. Wilson, Jr.
- Succeeded by: Elliott Abrams

Personal details
- Born: Patricia Murphy; August 12, 1929 New York City, U.S.
- Died: May 20, 2016 (aged 86) Chapel Hill, North Carolina, U.S.
- Party: Democratic Party
- Spouse(s): Paul Derian; Hodding Carter III
- Education: University of Virginia School of Nursing

Patricia Murphy Derian (née Murphy; August 12, 1929 – May 20, 2016) was an American civil rights and human rights activist who opposed racism in Mississippi and went on to serve as Assistant Secretary of State for Human Rights and Humanitarian Affairs from 1977 to 1981. She was, remembered The Times of London, "a courageous champion of civil rights who took on some of the world's most brutal dictators in her role as a senior American diplomat".

== Biography ==
Patricia Murphy was born on August 12, 1929, in New York City and grew up in Danville, Virginia. She was educated at the University of Virginia School of Nursing, graduating in 1952. She married Paul Derian following graduation, and worked as a nurse. She was a supporter of the Civil Rights Movement.

in 1959, she moved to Jackson, Mississippi. There, she volunteered in Head Start and supported public school desegregation. Derian helped organize the Loyalist Democrats (not to be confused with the Mississippi Freedom Democratic Party) as a challenge to the state's all-white official delegation and was elected as one of Mississippi's delegates to the 1968 Democratic National Convention. She remained active in civil rights in the 1970s, serving as president of the Southern Regional Council and was a member of the executive committee of the American Civil Liberties Union.

During the 1976 U.S. presidential election, Derian was deputy director of the Carter-Mondale campaign. After Jimmy Carter won that election, he nominated Derian to be Coordinator for Human Rights and Humanitarian Affairs. President Carter, however, had the post elevated to that of Assistant Secretary of State for Human Rights and Humanitarian Affairs effective August 17, 1977, and Derian served in that capacity for the remainder of the Carter administration. In this post and as head of the new Bureau of Human Rights and Humanitarian Affairs in the United States Department of State, she worked to improve policy coordination on humanitarian issues such as human rights, refugees, and prisoners of war.

In 1978, Derian married Hodding Carter III, who was then Assistant Secretary of State for Public Affairs.

Derian was a vocal critic of Jeane Kirkpatrick and of the so-called Kirkpatrick Doctrine during the 1980s, which advocated U.S. support of anticommunist governments around the world, including authoritarian dictatorships, if they went along with Washington's aims —believing they could be led into democracy by example. Kirkpatrick wrote, "Traditional authoritarian governments are less repressive than revolutionary autocracies." Derian objected to Kirkpatrick's characterization of some governments as only "moderately repressive", arguing that this line of thinking allowed the U.S. to support "a little bit of torture" or "moderate" prison sentences for political dissenters. Derian ceaselessly pointed out that, when it comes to human rights, in terms of morality, credibility and effectiveness, "you always have to play it straight."

Amongst those Derian believed the United States should not support was the Shah of Iran arguing in the lead up to the Iranian Revolution that the US should not be offering any assistance to the Shah "regardless of what cause those opponents might serve".

Derian, who had headed an Inter-American Commission on Human Rights delegation in 1979 to investigate reports of widespread human rights abuses in Argentina, returned to Buenos Aires in 1985 to testify in the historic Trial of the Juntas. She was quoted in documents in the National Security Archive openly accusing military leaders of torture of prisoners at a meeting in Argentina in 1977. An Argentinian journalist, Jacobo Timerman, who was tortured by the junta, credited Derian with saving him from execution. She supported Philippine leader Ninoy Aquino and the South Korean dissident Kim Dae-jung. (When Kim was elected president she was invited as a special guest to his inauguration.) In December 2016, it was revealed that Derian eliminated her State Department files shortly before the January 20, 1981, inauguration of Ronald Reagan (who lampooned Derian, saying that she should "walk a mile in the moccasins" of the military despots before she criticized them) for fear that his political appointees "might share those names and their information with the oppressive foreign governments which would put her informants in greater peril".

As the principal source of an October 1987 exposé published in The Nation, Derian revealed that in June 1976 Secretary of State Henry Kissinger had secretly given a "green light" of approval to Argentina's new far-right military rulers for state terrorist policies against a purposely overblown left-wing guerrilla threat. "It sickened me", said Derian upon revealing that in 1977, then-U.S. Ambassador to Argentina Robert C. Hill reported to her Kissinger's real role, "that with an imperial wave of his hand, an American could sentence people to death on the basis of a cheap whim. As time went on I saw Kissinger's footprints in a lot of countries. It was the repression of a democratic ideal."

She died in Chapel Hill, North Carolina, on May 20, 2016, aged 87, from Alzheimer's disease. The same day, former President Carter issued the following statement: "Rosalynn and I are deeply saddened by the passing of Patricia Derian. As the senior State Department official in charge of human rights during my administration, Patt spent hundreds of hours meeting with victims and their families. She became a champion of oppressed people around the world, helping me exert pressure on dictatorships from Argentina to South Korea. Because of her determination and effective advocacy, countless human rights and democracy activists survived that period, going on to plant the seeds of freedom in Latin America, Asia, and beyond. We send our deepest condolences to her husband, Hodding Carter, and their extended family."

== Publications ==
- Human Rights: A World Perspective (1978)
- Human Rights: The Role of Law and Lawyers: March 16, 1978, Washington, D.C OCLC 929553027
- coauthored with Warren Christopher, Four Treaties on Human Rights (1979)
- Human Rights in Latin America (1979)
- Human Rights in Jeopardy (1980)
- Review of Human Rights in Latin America (1980)
- Human Rights in South Africa (1980)
- U.S. Commitment to Human Rights (1980)

Government offices
Preceded by James M. Wilson, Jr.	Assistant Secretary of State for Human Rights and Humanitarian Affairs; August 17, 1977 – January 19, 1981	Succeeded by Elliott Abrams
