= John Shattuck =

American diplomat

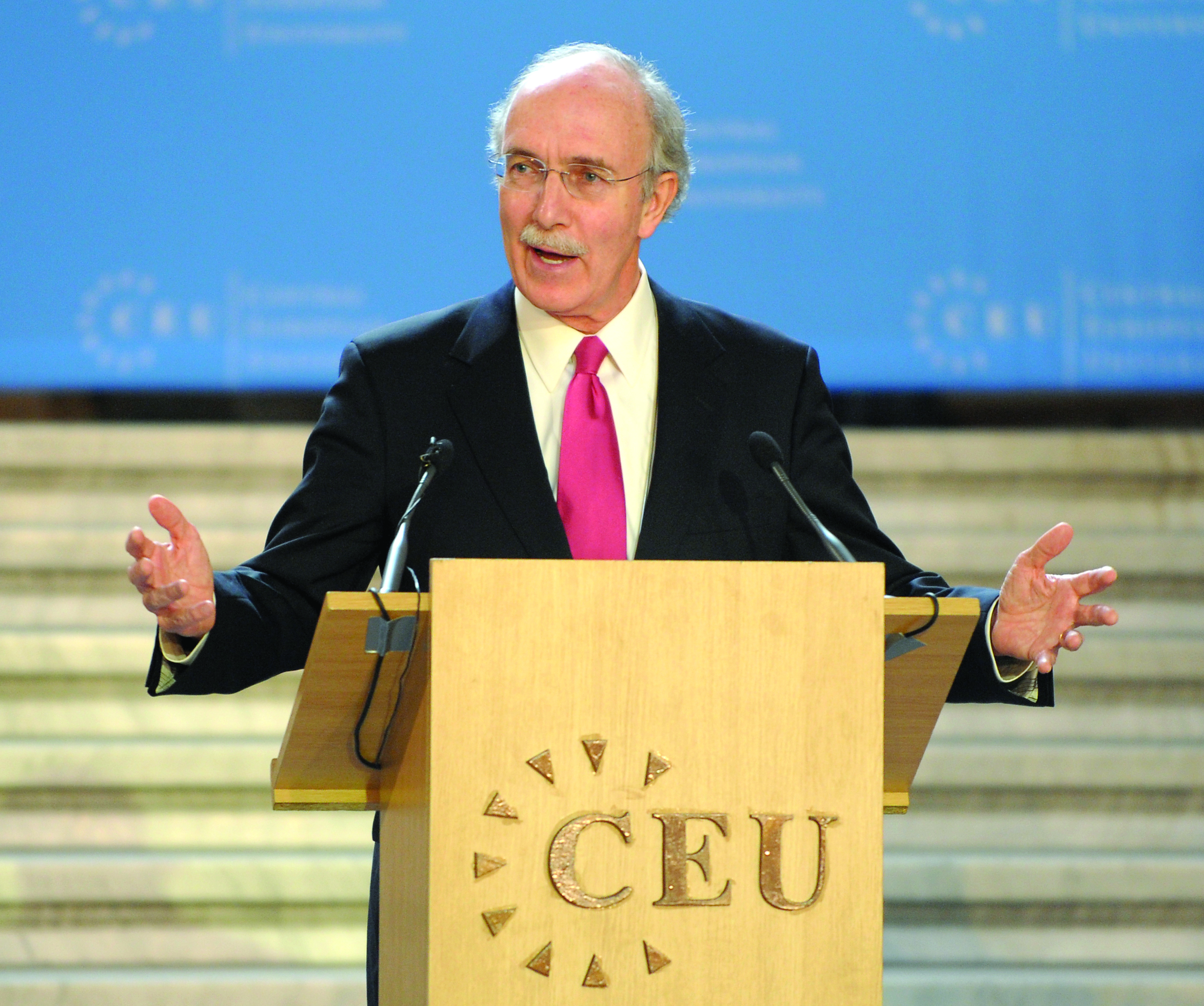
- John Shattuck, inauguration as Central European University President and Rector. November 2, 2009

6th Assistant Secretary of State for Democracy, Human Rights, and Labor
- In office June 2, 1993 – November 13, 1998
- President: Bill Clinton
- Preceded by: Patricia Diaz Dennis
- Succeeded by: Harold Hongju Koh

3rd United States Ambassador to the Czech Republic
- In office October 22, 1998 – December 16, 2000
- President: Bill Clinton
- Preceded by: Jenonne R. Walker
- Succeeded by: Craig Roberts Stapleton

President and Rector of Central European University
- In office 2009–2016
- Preceded by: Yehuda Elkana
- Succeeded by: Michael Ignatieff

Personal details
- Born: 1943 (age 82–83)
- Education: Yale University; Clare College, Cambridge; Yale Law School

John Howard Francis Shattuck (born 22 September 1943) is an international legal scholar and human rights leader. He served as the fourth President and Rector of Central European University (CEU) from August 2009 until July 31, 2016. He is a senior fellow at the Harvard Kennedy School, and he joined the faculty of Fletcher School of Law and Diplomacy in January 2017.

== Biography ==
Shattuck received a BA from Yale College in 1965, an MA in 1967 from Clare College, Cambridge University, with First Class Honors in International Law, and a JD degree in 1970 from Yale Law School. While at Yale and subsequently, Shattuck was an active member of the Yale Russian Chorus.

=== Career ===
His first position was National Staff Counsel at the American Civil Liberties Union 1971-76; he then served from 1976 to 1984 as Executive Director of the Washington office and national staff counsel, handling a number of prominent civil rights and liberties cases, including Halperin v. Kissinger, in which he took the deposition of former President Richard Nixon in 1976.

From 1984 to 1993 he was appointed by Harvard President Derek Bok to be vice president, government, community and public affairs, at Harvard University, and beginning in 1986 was also a Lecturer at Harvard Law School, and Senior Associate, Program on Science, Technology and Public Policy, Harvard Kennedy School.

From 1993 to 1998, he was United States Assistant Secretary of State for Democracy, Human Rights and Labor under President Bill Clinton, where he played a key role in the establishment by the United Nations of the International Criminal Tribunals for Rwanda and former Yugoslavia, working closely with Secretary of State Madeleine Albright. In 1995, he was the first international diplomat to reach survivors of the Srebrenica genocide in Bosnia, assembling evidence for the UN Security Council vote authorizing NATO intervention in Bosnia. During this tenure, he met with Chinese dissident Wei Jingsheng and the Chinese government used the meeting as a pretext to arrest Wei and re-imprison him.

Shattuck served as U.S. Ambassador to the Czech Republic from 1998 to 2000, assisting the Czech government in joining NATO and beginning to meet the requirements for becoming a member several years later of the European Union. Shattuck participated with US special envoy Richard Holbrooke in negotiating the Dayton Peace Agreement and other efforts to end the war in Bosnia.

In 2001 he became Chief Executive Officer of the John F. Kennedy Library Foundation, and in 2007 also a senior fellow at Tufts University, where he taught international relations. In 2001 and 2002, the Library and Foundation delivered a widely broadcast series of public events, "Responding to Terrorism," that examined issues of international security and human rights following the September 11 attacks.

He was elected to the Common Cause National Governing Board in 2003.

In August 2009 he became the fourth President and Rector of Central European University (CEU). He was also Professor of Legal Studies and International Relations, and taught an interdisciplinary course entitled "U.S. Foreign Policy, Human Rights and The Rule of Law."

Under Shattuck's leadership, CEU continued to pursue to its mission to promote open societies that respect human rights and the rule of law, introducing new initiatives in that direction. Protecting academic freedom and the autonomy of the university during an increasingly authoritarian government in Hungary were among Shattuck's main priorities. At his initiative, CEU launched the Frontiers of Democracy Initiative in 2014, which brought together academics and practitioners from across the globe to explore what democracy means in an increasingly complex world.

Shattuck oversaw the introduction of cutting-edge interdisciplinary programs and initiatives into CEU's academic program, such as cognitive science, network science, a religious studies specialization and the Humanities Initiative. CEU also embarked on a major redevelopment project of its downtown Budapest campus, completed in 2016. CEU's academic excellence was recognized in recent university rankings, as CEU is constantly improving on its Quacquarelli Symonds (QS) rankings, with politics and international studies ranked as 29th in the world in 2015, and also featured in Times Higher Education's Top 100. CEU also secured the most European Research Council Grants among the Central-Eastern European member states’ universities in the 2007-2013 period.

Following a seven-year tenure as CEU's President and Rector, Shattuck stepped down on July 31, 2016. In his honor CEU established the Shattuck Center on Human Rights at the University's Department of Public Policy. He became President Emeritus of CEU on August 1, and moved to Boston to become professor of practice at the Fletcher School of Law and Diplomacy and senior fellow at the John F. Kennedy School of Government Carr Center for Human Rights Policy. At Fletcher in 2017 he helped initiate a joint masters degree program on transatlantic affairs between the Fletcher School and the College of Europe in Bruges, Belgium, and taught the foundational course, "US-EU Relations: An interdisciplinary Analysis of Transatlantic Affairs," to students at both the Fletcher School and the College of Europe. At the Harvard Kennedy School Carr Center he directed a three-year initiative, "Reimagining Rights and Responsibilities in the United States," which reviewed the state of rights and democracy and led to the publication of a major study co-authored by Shattuck, Sushma Raman and Mathias Risse in 2022, "Holding Together: the Hijacking of Rights in America and How to Reclaim Them for Everyone."

== Publications ==
Shattuck is the author of three books: "Holding Together: The Hijacking of Rights in America and How to Reclaim Them for Everyone", co-authored with Sushma Raman and Mathias Risse and Published by The New Press in 2022, about contemporary attacks on human rights and democracy in the US, Freedom on Fire: Human Rights Wars and America’s Response, published by Harvard University Press in 2003, about the international response to genocide and other crimes against humanity in the 1990s, that, according to WorldCat, is held in 1636 libraries and the textbook Rights of Privacy, published by National Textbook Co. in 1977, and held in 515 libraries. He has also written many book chapters, and more than 50 articles.

== Recognition ==
He has received honorary degrees from Kenyon College, the University of Rhode Island, the John Jay College of Criminal Justice at the City University of New York, and the University of West Bohemia. He received the Ambassador's Award from the American Bar Association Central and East European Law Initiative, the Human Rights Award from the United Nations Association of Boston, and the Yale Law School Public Service Award. In 2007, he was elected to the American Academy of Arts and Sciences.

Government offices
Preceded by Patricia Diaz Dennis	Assistant Secretary of State for Democracy, Human Rights, and Labor; June 2, 1993 – November 13, 1998	Succeeded by Harold Hongju Koh
Diplomatic posts
Preceded by Jenonne R. Walker	U.S. Ambassador to the Czech Republic; 1998–2000	Succeeded by Craig Roberts Stapleton
