= Gregg Rickman =

American Congressional staffer and lobbyist

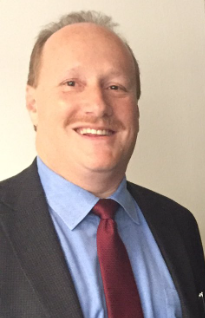

Office to Monitor and Combat Antisemitism

Special Envoy
- In office May 22, 2006 – January 20, 2009
- President: George W. Bush
- Preceded by: Position established
- Succeeded by: Hannah Rosenthal

Personal details
- Education: John Carroll University, University of Miami

Gregg J. Rickman (born 1964) is an American former congressional staffer and lobbyist who also served as the inaugural U.S. Special Envoy to Monitor and Combat Antisemitism from 2006 to 2009. Prior to his appointment, he was director of congressional affairs at the Republican Jewish Coalition. Later he was the deputy director of policy and government affairs at AIPAC. He also served as staffer for Republican U.S. Senators Alphonse D'Amato (New Jersey) and Mike Rounds (South Dakota). In the late 1990s, he was the lead staff member of the U.S. Senate's Swiss bank inquiry.

== Early life ==
Rickman was born and raised in Cleveland, Ohio. His grandfather fled pogroms in Russia. His father-in-law was a Holocaust survivor. He received a bachelor's degree in 1986 and a master's degree in 1988 in Russian and Middle Eastern history from John Carroll University. He completed coursework for a Ph.D. in International Relations from the University of Miami in 1990. He later completed his dissertation and was awarded a Ph.D. in 2004

== Political career ==
Rickman began working at the U.S. Capitol in 1991 as the Legislative Director for U.S. Senator Al D’Amato (R-NY). After the Republican Party won control of the U.S. Senate in the 1994 elections, D’Amato became chairman of the United States Senate Committee on Banking, Housing, and Urban Affairs.

Under D’Amato's chairmanship from 1995 to 1998, Rickman was the committee's Holocaust Projects Director leading the committee's Swiss bank Inquiry, a 3-year investigation into the disposition of assets of Holocaust victims that had been held by Swiss banks since World War II. These efforts were one of the factors leading to the filing of a major World Jewish Congress lawsuit against the three largest Swiss banks on behalf of Holocaust victims. In 1996, Rickman's team discovered documents in the National Archives relating to Operation Safehaven, a U.S. intelligence operation to prevent Nazi Germany from hiding assets in third countries after the war. The committee's investigation resulted in a $1.25 billion settlement on behalf of the survivors. William Daroff credited Rickman as "almost single-handedly the one who uncovered the corruption and immorality of the Swiss banks."

After D’Amato lost re-election to Chuck Schumer in 1998, Rickman joined the staff of Sen. Peter Gosselin Fitzgerald. He later worked as an official at the Broadcasting Board of Governors.

From 2001 to 2003, Rickman was the Director of Congressional Affairs for the Republican Jewish Coalition, where he worked on legislative issues of concern to the Jewish community. He also led outreach to Jewish social action groups and coalitions as well as constituent member groups.

From 2004 to 2006, Rickman was a staff member of the House International Relations Committee, first on the Subcommittee on the Middle East and Central Asia where he handled numerous issues including Antisemitism and Holocaust restitution. Later, Rickman was Staff Director of the Subcommittee on Oversight and Investigations, where he directed the committee's investigation into the UN Oil-for-Food program and was the main author of the committee's report on the investigation.

== U.S. Special Envoy ==
The Global Anti-Semitism Review Act of 2004 created the position of a Special Envoy to Monitor and Combat Antisemitism. Secretary of State Condoleezza Rice appointed Rickman as the first occupant of the position, and he was sworn in by Rice on May 22, 2006.

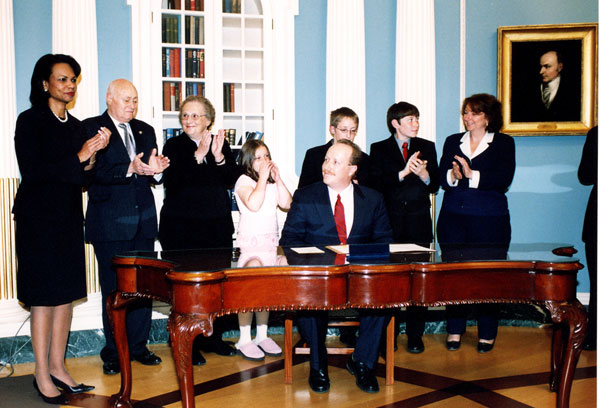
Swearing-in of Gregg Rickman, Special Envoy for Monitoring and Combating Anti-Semitism

During his tenure, Rickman was involved in winning visas for Yemeni Jews. In December 2007, Rickman traveled to Yemen to assess the condition of the Jewish community there and to investigate a report of abduction, forced conversion to Islam, and marriage of a young Yemenite woman. Over 60 Yemeni Jews were resettled in the United States due to the efforts of Rickman's office and organizations such as HIAS.

Rickman stepped down after the election of Barack Obama in the 2008 U.S. presidential election. He was replaced by Hannah Rosenthal.

== Later career ==
Rickman was critical of his successor, Hannah Rosenthal, for her criticism of Israeli Ambassador to the United States Michael Oren over his snubbing of the liberal Jewish lobby group J-Street in 2009.

After stepping down as Special Envoy at the end of the Bush Administration, Rickman was hired as the Director of Foreign Military Sales for National Air Cargo. In 2010, he became the Deputy Director of Policy and Government Affairs for the pro-Israel lobby group AIPAC. He served in this position until 2014.

From 2015 to 2017, Rickman was Legislative Director and Deputy Chief of Staff for Sen. Mike Rounds.

== Publications ==
In 1999, Rickman wrote Swiss Banks and Jewish Souls, an account of his work on the Swiss bank inquiry and Holocaust restitution. In the Central European History journal, John Teschke of University of California, Riverside called the book "an effective defense of the D'Amato effort and has made the job of apologist for the Swiss Nazi-era record far more difficult." However, in the same review Teschke also stated that Rickman "perhaps has exaggerated the significance of his...efforts at the expense of [Edgar] Bronfman, who is considered the central figure in other accounts." In The Public Historian journal, the book was described as a "blow-by-blow account of the story's unfolding." However, in his 2003 book, The Holocaust Industry, the Jewish political scientist Norman Finkelstein questioned the motives behind the restitution efforts and the resulting lawsuit against the Swiss banks. As part of his overall criticism, Finkelstein also took issue with Rickman's characterization of the Swiss, referring to a passage where Rickman opined that a "deeper truth" about the Swiss was that "Down deep, perhaps deeper than they thought, a latent arrogance about themselves and against others existed in their very makeup. Try as they did they could not hide their upbringing".

In 2006, Rickman published Conquest and Redemption, A History of Jewish Assets from the Holocaust, describing how Nazi Germany and other countries delayed Holocaust restitution efforts.

Rickman's third book Hating the Jews was released in 2012. In the book, Rickman details the distinct challenges with combatting antisemitism.

== See also ==
- List of combating antisemitism envoys
