= Ellie Cohanim =

American broadcast journalist

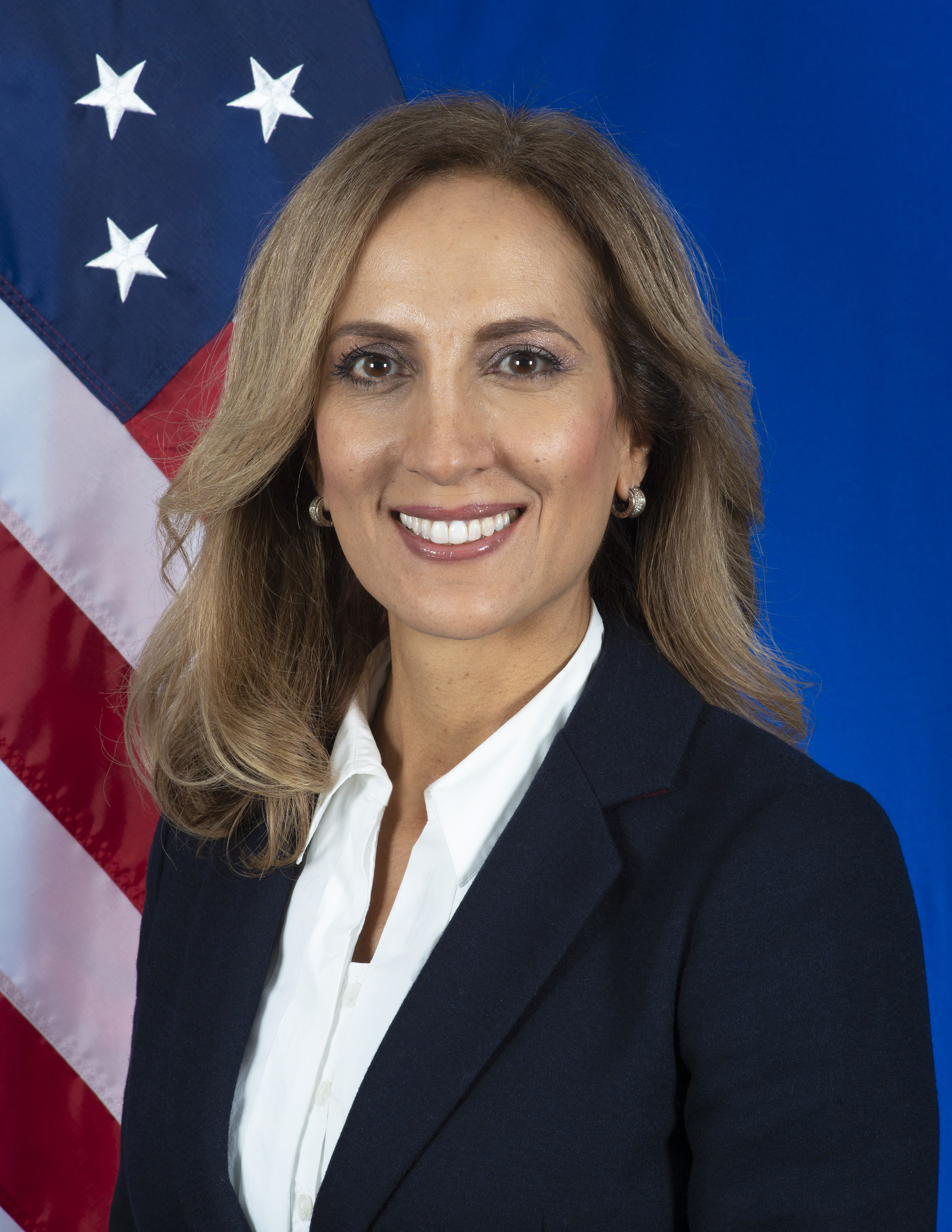
- Official portrait, 2019

Deputy Special Envoy to Monitor and Combat Anti-Semitism
- In office November 12, 2019 – January 20, 2021
- President: Donald Trump
- Special Envoy: Elan Carr
- Preceded by: Seth J. Korman
- Succeeded by: Deborah Lipstadt

Personal details
- Born: December 10, 1972 (age 53) Tehran, Iran
- Citizenship: United States
- Party: Republican
- Spouse: Aaron Goldberg (m. 2015)
- Children: 2
- Education: Barnard College (BA); Hebrew University

Ellie Cohanim (born Elham Cohanim, December 10, 1972) is an Iranian-born former American diplomat and broadcast journalist who served as Deputy Special Envoy to Monitor and Combat Anti-Semitism at the United States Department of State during the first Donald Trump administration.

== Education ==
Cohanim earned her B.A. in political science from Barnard College. She conducted graduate studies in International Relations at the Hebrew University of Jerusalem.

== Career ==
Prior to her position at the United States Department of State, she was a Special Correspondent and Senior Vice President for Jewish Broadcasting Service (JBS), and an Executive at Yeshiva University, the Jewish Theological Seminary of America, and UJA-Federation of New York.

Cohanim has criticized the government in Iran, and what she has termed their "obsessive anti-Semitism". Cohanim criticized the social media company Twitter over what she deemed their hypocrisy in refusing to censor the Twitter account of the Iranian Supreme Leader Ali Khamenei, while claiming it is censoring the tweets of President Trump. Cohanim went on to call upon Twitter to completely ban Ali Khamenei from their platform. Cohanim has condemned the terrorist-designated group Hezbollah, citing their ties to Iran, and has publicly stated that the US praises countries which follow the US in designating Hezbollah a terrorist group and freezing their assets.

At the outset of the COVID-19 pandemic, Cohanim proclaimed that the emerging conspiracy theories blaming Jews for the global outbreak and spread of the Coronavirus are a "modern-day blood libel", and admonished government figures in Iran, Turkey, and the Palestinian Authority for spreading these conspiracy theories.

== Political views ==
In 2025, Ellie Cohanim opposed Zohran Mamdani during the 2025 New York City mayoral election and supported Andrew Cuomo. Later in the campaign, amidst Islamophobic attacks directed towards Mamdani, Cohanim posted images from the September 11 attacks alongside the caption "Vote Andrew Cuomo & save our city."

== Personal life ==
Cohanim was born in Tehran, Iran, to a Jewish family that fled the country at the start of the Islamic Revolution of 1979, and found refuge in the United States.
