= Hannah Rosenthal =

American diplomat

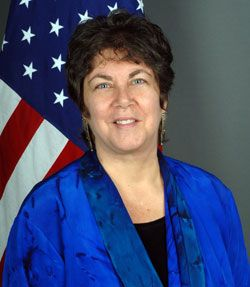

United States Commission on International Religious Freedom

Commissioner
- In office June 17, 2014 – 2015
- Appointed by: Nancy Pelosi

Office to Monitor and Combat Anti-Semitism

U.S. Special Envoy
- In office November 23, 2009 – October 5, 2012
- President: Barack Obama
- Preceded by: Gregg Rickman
- Succeeded by: Michael Kozak (acting)

Personal details
- Born: 1951 (age 74–75)
- Children: 2
- Education: University of Wisconsin–Madison

Hannah Rosenthal (born 1951) is a former American government official and Jewish non-profit executive who served as the U.S. Special Envoy for Monitoring and Combating Antisemitism from 2009 until 2012 during the Obama administration.

Rosenthal was previously head of the Jewish Council for Public Affairs, during which time she was named as one of the 50 most influential Jews in America.

After serving as Special Envoy, Rosenthal was later appointed by Speaker of the House Nancy Pelosi to serve as a commissioner of the U.S. Commission on International Religious Freedom from 2014 to 2016. Rosenthal served as president and CEO of the Milwaukee Jewish Federation until her retirement in 2018.

== Biography ==
Rosenthal's father was a Holocaust survivor, a former prisoner at the Buchenwald concentration camp, and a Reform rabbi. She attended Mount Holyoke College in South Hadley, Massachusetts through her sophomore year and then transferred to and graduated from the University of Wisconsin. She then studied for the rabbinate at Hebrew Union College in Jerusalem and Los Angeles, but dropped out in 1975.

Rosenthal served as the founding executive director of the Wisconsin Women's Council from 1985 to 1992. She is featured in the Council's 25th Anniversary Tribute video.

In 1995, Rosenthal was appointed by the Clinton administration to serve as Midwest regional director of the U.S. Department of Health and Human Services. In 2005, she was named one of the Forward 50, a list of the 50 most influential Jews selected by The Forward newspaper.

From August 2000 to 2005, Rosenthal headed the Jewish Council for Public Affairs (JCPA). She was the vice president for community relations for the not-for-profit WPS Health Insurance Corporation. Rosenthal served on the advisory council of J Street and J Street PAC.

During the 2008 presidential election, she supported and contributed to Hillary Clinton. She served on the board of Americans for Peace Now.

== Special Envoy ==
=== Appointment ===
According to Jewish Standard, Rosenthal reportedly did not want to become Special Envoy and "was advocating for someone else in the role", but then State U.S. Assistant Secretary of State for Democracy, Human Rights, and Labor (DRL) Michael Posner "was very insistent.”

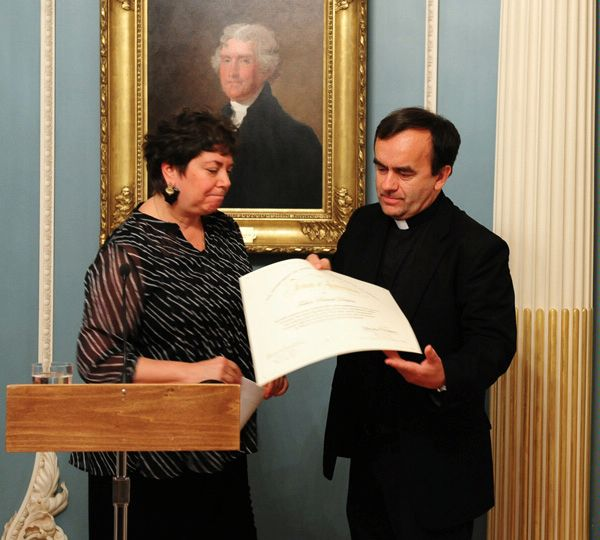
Hannah Rosenthal, U.S. Special Envoy to Monitor and Combat Anti-Semitism, recognizes the work of Father Patrick Desbois, President of the Yahad-In Unum Association of France, with a Tribute of Appreciation certificate, May 12, 2011.

Together with Farah Pandith, U.S. Special Representative to Muslim Communities, Rosenthal launched the Acceptance, Respect and Tolerance Initiative to promote inter-faith and inter-ethnic understanding. The initiative was criticized by Gregg Rickman, her predecessor as Special Envoy in the George W. Bush administration.

=== Tenure ===
In December 2009 Rosenthal criticized Israel's ambassador to the United States Michael Oren for his "most unfortunate" remarks regarding J Street. In response, the Israeli Embassy in Washington requested clarification from the Obama administration. Alan Solow, chairman of the Conference of Presidents of Major American Jewish Organizations, was also critical of Rosenthal.

Rosenthal met with a number of foreign officials regarding antisemitism, including Ilmar Reepalu then mayor of Malmö, Sweden. Reepalu has been criticized for his comments about antisemitism and Jews but he has responded by saying that "antisemitism is an abomination" and that Jews in Malmö have nothing to do with Israel's actions and should not be called to account for that. After the meeting, Rosenthal described Reepalu's language as antisemitic. Rosenthal also met with the Swedish Minister for Integration, Erik Ullenhag. Ullenhag released a statement after the meeting, saying that Reepalu's comments "obstructs the fight against antisemitism".

Rosenthal also confronted Saudi officials regarding antisemitism in their textbooks and requested that Jordanian officials teach about the Holocaust in their schools.

During her tenure, Rosenthal and her staff established a mandatory 90-minute course on antisemitism at the Foreign Service Institute, which is the training school for diplomats, along with a 341-word definition of antisemitism, which includes newer forms of antisemitism, including Holocaust denial. The United States State Department human rights reports began reporting antisemitism with more frequency, for which Rosenthal was credited.

== Political controversies ==
In 2008, Rosenthal was criticized by then-ADL president Abraham Foxman in an open letter for saying that the speakers of the Israel solidarity rally "espoused narrow, ultra-conservative views of what it means to be pro-Israel". The list of speakers included Harry Reid, Dick Gephardt, and Natan Sharansky. In response to Foxman's letter, Rosenthal said in an interview to Tablet: "I have worked with Abe in the past and I consider Abe a friend of mine... we mostly agree." Foxman was supportive of Rosenthal's appointment; in a statement issued by the Anti-Defamation League, Foxman wrote: "We look forward to working with Hannah Rosenthal".

Foxman has also criticized Rosenthal for organizing and accompanying a trip by eight American imams and Muslim leaders to the Dachau and Auschwitz-Birkenau concentration camps, saying that the involvement of the State Department in an intercommunal affair was unwarranted. He explained that "having Muslims speaking out about anti-Semitism, that's our job" and not that of the State Department. However, Foxman and Rosenthal later settled their differences, and Foxman praised Rosenthal for her work, as well as for establishing a mandatory course on antisemitism for diplomats.

== Personal life ==
Rosenthal is open about how she survived uterine cancer.

== See also ==
- List of combating antisemitism envoys

Diplomatic posts
Preceded by Gregg Rickman	United States Special Envoy for Monitoring and Combating anti-Semitism; 2009–2012	Succeeded by Michael Kozak (acting)
