= Michael Kozak =

American diplomat

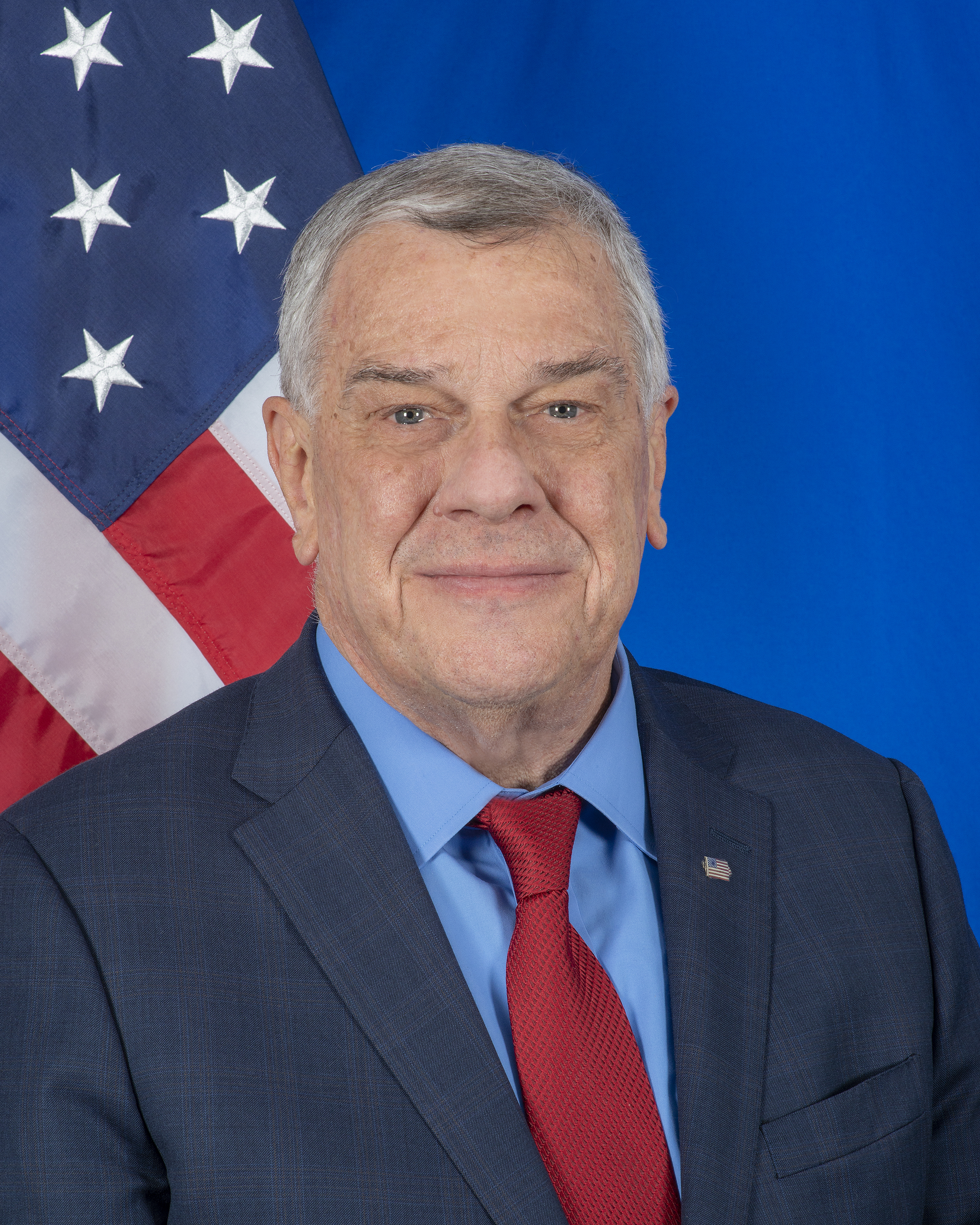

Senior Bureau Official, Bureau of Western Hemisphere Affairs
- In office January 20, 2025 – August 14, 2026
- President: Donald Trump
- Preceded by: Brian A. Nichols (Assistant Secretary)
- Succeeded by: Juan Pablo Segura (Assistant Secretary)

Senior Official for Global Criminal Justice
- In office January 20, 2021 – January 1, 2023
- President: Joe Biden
- Preceded by: Morse Tan

Acting Assistant Secretary of State for Western Hemisphere Affairs
- In office September 13, 2019 – January 20, 2021
- President: Donald Trump
- Preceded by: Kimberly Breier
- Succeeded by: Julie J. Chung

Senior Bureau Official for Democracy, Human Rights, and Labor
- In office September 5, 2017 – September 12, 2019
- President: Donald Trump
- Preceded by: Tom Malinowski
- Succeeded by: Robert Destro

Acting United States Special Envoy for Monitoring and Combating anti-Semitism
- In office October 5, 2012 – May 20, 2013
- President: Barack Obama
- Preceded by: Hannah Rosenthal
- Succeeded by: Ira Forman

United States Ambassador to Belarus
- In office September 15, 2000 – August 8, 2003
- President: Bill Clinton; George W. Bush
- Preceded by: Daniel V. Speckhard
- Succeeded by: George A. Krol

Personal details
- Born: September 18, 1946 (age 80) Pasadena, California, U.S.
- Education: University of California, Berkeley (AB, JD)
- Occupation: Attorney, diplomat

Michael G. Kozak (born September 18, 1946) is an American diplomat in the United States Department of State who had served as the Senior Bureau Official for Western Hemisphere Affairs. He had served Acting Assistant Secretary from 2019 to 2021. He previously served as U.S. Ambassador to Belarus between 2000 and 2003 and chief of mission at the United States Interests Section in Havana between 1996 and 1999, and was a nominee to be U.S. Ambassador to El Salvador in 1991. He achieved a measure of prominence in the 1980s for his attempts to negotiate with Panamanian leader Manuel Noriega to leave power.

Kozak is a civil service employee of the U.S. State Department and charter member of the Senior Executive Service. He has been described as a problem solver with practical solutions, who is "not prone to ideological diatribes." He has also been called "an outgoing, let's roll-up-our-sleeves kind of guy with a square boxer's body and face" and "pugnacious."

== Diplomatic work ==
=== 1970s international negotiation and mediation ===
During the 1970s, Kozak served as a negotiator on the Panama Canal Treaties during the Nixon, Ford, and Carter administrations. He then participated in the multilateral efforts to mediate an end to the Nicaraguan civil war in 1978–1979, and was a member of the U.S. mediation team that implemented the Egypt-Israel peace treaty and sought a solution to the Lebanese Civil War.

=== Cuba ===
In the 1980s, Kozak was heavily involved in Cuba issues at the State Department, in its American Republic Affairs unit.

In April 1980, as the State Department determined its policies toward the Mariel boatlift of Cuban refugees to the United States, and formulated its statements on possible prosecution of Cuban Americans and hired ships bringing family members from Cuba to the United States, Kozak wrote a memo outlining various options for dealing with migration of Cuban refugees. The memo included points that could be used to justify a decision to prohibit entry. Kozak noted that prosecutions for bringing Cubans to the United States in the past were rare, and that unless the government were prepared to demonstrate its willingness to do so, Cuban Americans would assume there was no serious risk in participating in the boatlift.

In 1980 and 1981, Kozak was part of a State Department team meeting with Cuban officials over migration and other issues.

Between 1982 and 1988, Kozak became a principal deputy assistant secretary of state level official in the Office of the Legal Advisor.

In 1984, Kozak was the legal advisor in the State Department's delegation that met at a midtown Manhattan hotel (while registered under pseudonyms to avoid attention) with Cuba's Vice Foreign Minister Ricardo Alarcón.

=== Legal recourse against terrorism attacks ===
While working as principal deputy legal advisor, Kozak originated an idea to settle a dispute between the U.S. government and the Chilean government over the killing of a former Chilean diplomat in exile in the United States, Orlando Letelier, and his American assistant Ronni Moffit in a 1976 car bombing near Dupont Circle in Washington, D.C. As Chile was unwilling to submit to a determination by a U.S. tribunal, Kozak proposed invoking the arbitration clause of the 1914 Chile-United States peace treaty, and Chile agreed.

In October 1985, Kozak testified before the House Committee on Foreign Affairs about recourse available to the United States government and U.S. citizens for the Achille Lauro terrorist attack.

=== Panama and Noriega and Central America ===
Between 1988 and 1991, Kozak held a principal deputy assistant secretary of state role in the Bureau of Inter-American Affairs.

In 1988, Kozak was a special presidential envoy who "achieved prominence ... when he led an unsuccessful effort to persuade then-Panamanian leader Manuel Noriega to agree to a democratic transfer of power" prior to the U.S. military deposing Noriega in December 1989.

In early 1988, Kozak had been sent to Panama repeatedly to try to negotiate on behalf of the U.S. government directly with Panamanian President Manuel Noriega, attempting to settle on terms under which Noreiga would step down. Kozak argued for a diplomatic arrangement under which indictment against Noriega would be quashed, sanctions would be lifted, and Noriega would step down and leave the country by August 1988.

After word leaked, the Senate passed a Sense of the Senate measure that the indictment should not be dropped, and Vice President George H. W. Bush denounced the negotiations. Kozak continued with the talks and delivered an ultimatum for Noreiga to agree to by May 25, 1988, but Noriega refused and the U.S. military eventually invaded the country.

In March 1989, as acting Assistant Secretary of State for Inter-American Affairs, Kozak advocated before Congress for funding for diplomatic efforts in Latin America. He also helped Secretary of State James Baker implement a bipartisan agreement on Central America designed to help end the conflict in Nicaragua.

In 1989, as principal deputy assistant secretary of state for Inter-American Affairs, working with Bernard Aronson, Kozak argued before a House hearing that relations with Cuba should not improve until the Castro regime made concessions to the United States on a variety of concerns.

The next year, Kozak was instrumental in promoting ICITAP as the appropriate organization to train the Panamanian Defense Forces for civil law enforcement work after the overthrow of Manuel Noriega, with mixed results.

=== U.S. ambassador to El Salvador nomination ===
In April 1991, Kozak was nominated to be U.S. Ambassador to El Salvador. His appointment, and that of Joseph Sullivan to be ambassador to Nicaragua, were blocked by Republican Senator Jesse Helms and Democratic Senator Chris Dodd, the chairman and ranking member of the Senate Foreign Affairs Western Hemisphere subcommittee. Their staffs had disapproved of the way in which the State Department had notified the committee of a particular programs, and held Sullivan and Kozak responsible as deputy assistant secretaries at the time. They also disliked the way in which Kozak had helped resolve the Contra situation in Nicaragua.

=== Chief of Mission in Cuba ===
In 1996, Kozak, as the new chief of the U.S. Interests Section in Havana, led a 100th anniversary commemoration of the sinking of the U.S.S. Maine, hosted American media at his house during a visit by the Pope, and interfaced with the Cuban Ministry of the Interior when requesting their information on a group allegedly financed by Cuban Americans that attempted attacks in Cuba.

=== Haiti ===
In March 1993, Kozak was a deputy to U.S. Special Advisor Lawrence Pezzullo on issues related to Haiti and the deposition of Haitian president Jean-Bertrand Aristide. He was invited by the new Assistant Secretary for Inter-American Affairs Alexander Watson to join the Haiti Working Group, where they worked in underfunded office space with furniture from the 1950s, peeling paint, and outdated Wang word processors. Kozak, as special negotiator, along with Pezzullo, was responsible for communications with Aristide, the Haitian military, the UN, and the White House.

During meetings with cabinet ministers in Haiti, Kozak would coax them into taking action. He also pushed officials with the United Nations Mission in Haiti to move against human rights violators.

In September 1994, Kozak accompanied General Colin Powell on a flight to Port-au-Prince, Haiti, less than 36 hours before the planned landing of American troops there, to convince the leader of the ruling military junta that had taken control, Raoul Cedras, to leave power.

=== U.S. ambassador to Belarus ===
On April 6, 2000, President Bill Clinton announced his intention to nominate Kozak to be U.S. Ambassador to Belarus. President Alexander Lukashenko made Kozak wait several months before arranging for Kozak to present his credentials for official recognition as ambassador.

In 2001, Kozak and Hans Georg Vik, the head of OSCE mission in Minsk, pushed for political opposition parties in Belarus to unite around a single leader, Uladzimir Hancharyk, the leader of the Trade Union Federation. Hancharyk did not gain widespread popular support, and was seen as a "remnant of the old Soviet days of privilege and Party control". Combined with ballot stuffing for the incumbent president, economic priming, and a crackdown on election observers, NGOs, and political activists, the central election commission controlled by President Lukashenko declared him the winner with 75.6 percent of the vote, a result contested as false and fraudulent by international bodies and other countries.

In November 2002, Kozak spoke before a conference in Washington, D.C., sponsored by the American Enterprise Institute and charged that Belarus President Lukashenko was illegally selling arms to the regime of Saddam Hussein.

=== Human rights ===
Between 2003 and 2005, Kozak held a principal deputy assistant secretary of state role in the Bureau of Democracy, Human Rights and Labor.

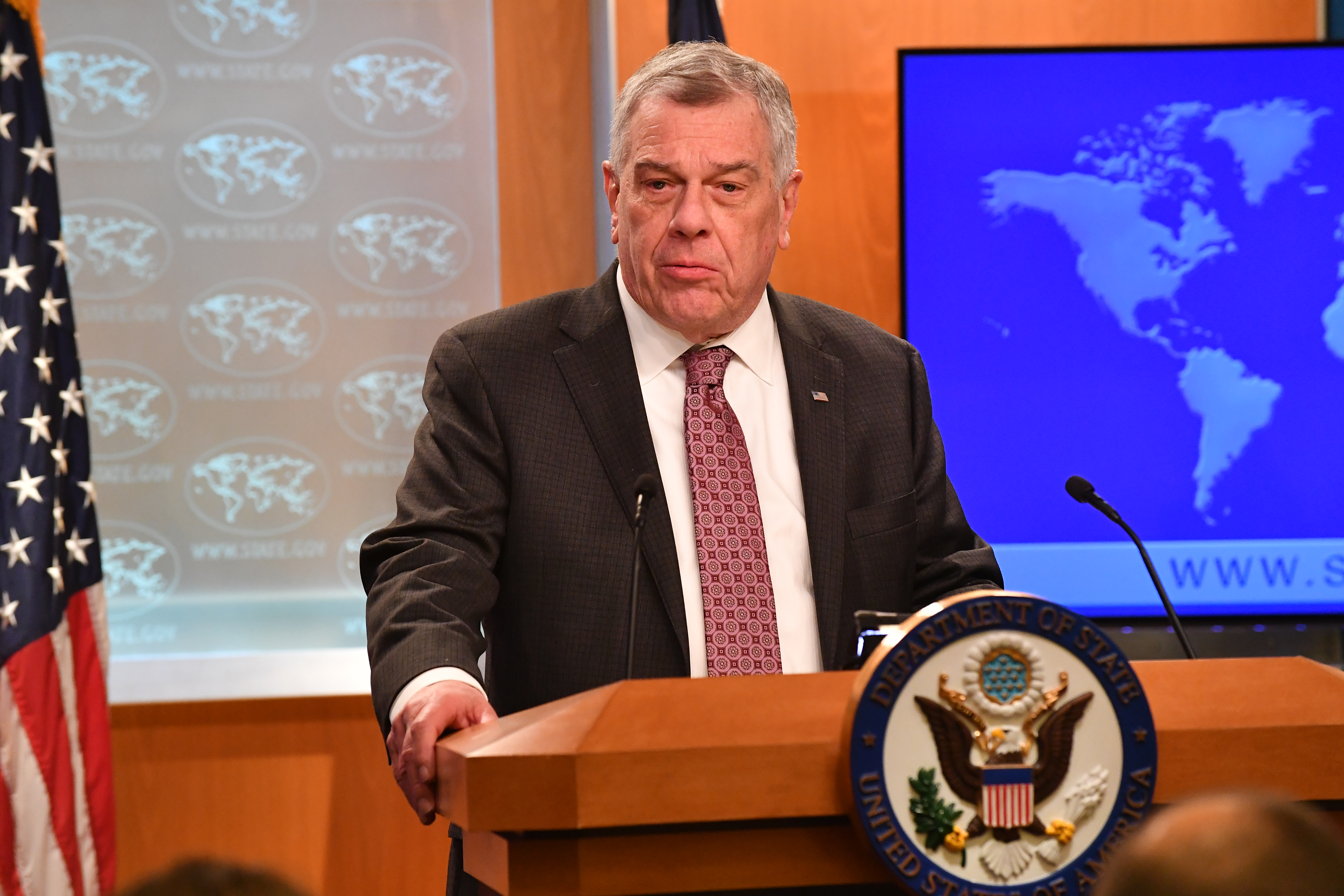
Kozak delivers remarks on the release of the 2017 Country Reports on Human Rights Practices at the Department of State at the U.S. Department of State in Washington, D.C., on April 20, 2018.

In 2004, Kozak testified before the House Committee on Government Reform on the human rights situation in the Indian-Pakistani disputed area of Kashmir.

Between 2005 and 2009, Kozak was a senior director on the National Security Council staff, with responsibility for democracy, human rights, international organizations, migration and detainee issues. He authored the first National Security Presidential Directive on democracy and human rights since the Carter administration.

Between 2009 and 2017, Kozak was senior adviser to the Assistant Secretary for Democracy, Human Rights and Labor, where he worked to negotiate a UN resolution on "Defamation of Religions" that respected freedom of expression.

Between October 2012 and May 2013, Kozak served as Acting Special Envoy for Monitoring and Combating Anti-Semitism, between Hannah Rosenthal and Ira Forman.

Between September 2017 and September 2019, Kozak held the title of Senior Bureau Official for Democracy, Human Rights and Labor.

== Personal ==
Kozak is of Czech ancestry. He received his bachelor's degree in political science at the University of California, Berkeley, in 1968, and his J.D. degree at Boalt Hall at the University of California, Berkeley, in 1971, where he was assistant managing editor of the California Law Review.

He was awarded the Belarusian Democratic Republic 100th Jubilee Medal in 2019.

Diplomatic posts
Preceded by Kimberly Breier	Acting Assistant Secretary for Western Hemisphere Affairs; 2019–2021	Succeeded by Julie J. Chung as Acting AS
Preceded by Daniel V. Speckhard	United States Ambassador to Belarus; 2000–2003	Succeeded by George A. Krol
Preceded by Hannah Rosenthal	United States Special Envoy for Monitoring and Combating anti-Semitism (acting); 2012–2013	Succeeded by Ira Forman
