= Katharina von Schnurbein =

German civil servant (born 1973)

European Commission coordinator on combating antisemitism and fostering Jewish life
- Incumbent
- Assumed office December 2015
- President: Jean-Claude Juncker; Ursula von der Leyen
- Preceded by: Position established

Personal details
- Born: 1973 (age 52–53) Bavaria, West Germany
- Children: 4
- Education: University of Bonn; Oxford University (M.St.); Center for European Integration Studies; (MES)

Baroness Katharina von Schnurbein (born 1973) is a German civil servant who is serving as the German federal government's antisemitism envoy. Previously she served as the European Commission's coordinator on combating antisemitism and fostering Jewish life since 2015. She was the first person to hold this role, which currently reports to Commissioner Magnus Brunner responsible for Internal Affairs and Migrations. During the von der Leyen I term of office (2019–2024), the portfolio was overseen by Margaritis Schinas, vice-president of the European Commission and European Commissioner for Promoting our European Way of Life. For her work she received an Honorary Doctorate by Ben Gurion University of the Negev.

== Early life ==
Baroness von Schnurbein was born in 1973 to an aristocratic family in the German state of Bavaria. Von Schnurbein is not Jewish.

Von Schnurbein completed her undergraduate studies in Political Science and Slavonic Studies at Charles University in Prague and at the University of Bonn. She also earned a master's degree in Slavonic Studies from Oxford University in 1997 and a master's degree in European Studies from the Center for European Integration Studies in Bonn in 1999.

== Professional career ==
After her studies, von Schnurbein briefly worked for a management consulting firm. From 2000 to 2002, she supported the chairman of the European Affairs Committee in the Bundestag in Berlin.

=== European Commission career ===
Von Schnurbein began her career at the European Union in 2002 as a communication and later press officer for the EU Delegation in Prague, Czech Republic. Following the European Union enlargement in 2004, she moved to Brussels to serve as spokesperson for European Commissioner for Employment, Social Affairs and Equal Opportunities, Vladimir Špidla. From 2010 to 2015, as an advisor to the President of the European Commission José Manuel Barroso, she coordinated the European Commission’s dialogue with churches, religions, philosophical and non-confessional organizations, as well as think tanks in Germany. This mission was part of Article 17 of the Treaty on the Functioning of the EU (TFEU) providing for the first time a legal basis for an open, transparent and regular dialogue between the EU institutions and churches, religious associations, and philosophical and non-confessional organisations.

=== Antisemitism coordinator ===
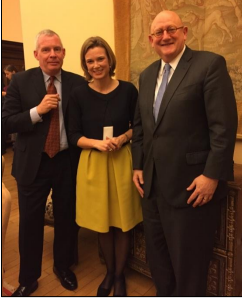
US Special Envoy for Holocaust Issues Nick Dean, EU Commission coordinator on combating antisemitism Katharina von Schnurbein, and US Special Envoy for Combating Antisemitism Ira Forman in Prague (2016)

In October 2015, the European Commission created the new position of Coordinator on combatting antisemitism in response to rising Antisemitism in Europe. As a career European Commission official, Von Schnurbein was appointed by then First Vice-President Frans Timmermans for the position in December 2015. According to The Times of Israël in 2023, some initially dismissed her as an EU mouthpiece or lightweight. Eight years later, she is almost universally recognized by Jewish community leaders as a quiet but powerful force promoting and delivering ways to foster Jewish life in Europe.

Her key responsibilities are to liaise with European Jewish communities and bodies and to propose and implement policies to address Antisemitism, promote Holocaust education, and foster Jewish life. In 2021 she drafted and together with her team has been implementing the first EU Strategy on combating antisemitism and fostering Jewish life.

In 2022, von Schnurbein argued that Belgian bans on ritual slaughter risked painting the Jewish and Muslim communities in Europe as "medieval". In response, von Schnurbein convened a joint meeting with representatives from the UNAOC, US State Department, OSCE and the European Parliament Working Group on antisemitism, bringing together European Jewish and Muslim leaders as well as EU and member States officials to discuss slaughter based on religious rules in the light of Freedom of Religion.

At an event hosted by the Israel Council on Foreign Relations in 2023, von Schnurbein stressed the importance of cracking down on disinformation on social media platforms in the struggle against antisemitism. Noting that this was especially commonplace during the COVID-19 pandemic, conspiracy theories are catalysts for bigotry against Jews; “Where conspiracy grows, antisemitism has already grown.”

In September 2024, von Schnurbein stated at a United Nations workshop that the current rise of antisemitic events "reminds us of the darkest days of Europe".

In 2025, von Schnurbein stated that anti-Zionism is "the denial of a state for the Jewish people. And that in itself is antisemitic". In reference to the IHRA definition, she explained that holding Jews collectively responsible for the actions of Israel is antisemitic and that such conflation is fully unacceptable.

=== German antisemitism envoy ===
On 28 October 2026 von Schnurbein succeeded Felix Klein as antisemitism commissioner in the German federal government's interior ministry.

== EU action on combatting antisemitism and fostering Jewish life ==
On 5 October 2021, the European Commission adopted its first-ever EU Strategy on combating antisemitism and fostering Jewish life (2021–2030). It holds almost 90 actions that prevent and address antisemitism online and offline, ensure security of Jewish premises, help to ensure victim support, ensure Holocaust remembrance as well as education about Jewish life and contribution to Europe as well as the history and contemporary forms of antisemitism.

At the heart of the EU Antisemitism strategy is the declared aim of the European Union to foster Jewish life and to ensure that Jews in Europe can go about their lives in line with their religious and cultural traditions and free from security concerns. The strategy was widely welcomed.

To improve the situation for Jews in Europe and beyond, the European Commission works closely with EU Member States, Jewish communities and organisations as well as other civil society organisations and religious communities.

In 2024, the first progress report on the strategy revealed that 23 EU Member States have adopted and are implementing national strategies on antisemitism, 20 have appointed national envoys and 25 use the non-legally binding working definition of antisemitism by the International Holocaust Remembrance Alliance.

Following the Hamas attack on Israel on 7 October 2023, von Schnurbein warned about a “Tsunami of antisemitism”, pointing to the firebombing of synagogues, Stars of David spray-painted onto houses where Jews live and Jewish students attacked on university campuses.

== Controversy ==
According to EUobserver, citing a leaked diplomatic cable, von Schnurbein warned EU ambassadors that sanctions on Israel could fuel "rumors about Jews." The cable also shows that she was dismissive of the starvation in Gaza and repeated Israeli government claims that protests against the genocide in Gaza were the result of Hamas manipulation. The author, German-Israeli analyst Alon Sahar, claimed that she clearly breached her mandate. The human rights organization Amnesty International criticized von Schnurbein for relying on a "worrying conflation" of European Jewish people with Israel, as well as misrepresenting the situation in Gaza, with the latter point also being supported by Israeli historian Amos Goldberg. Von Schnurbein was also quoted as saying that bake sales by EU staff to raise funds for humanitarian relief, including Red Cross activity in Gaza, fueled "ambient antisemitism." Subsequently, 26 left-wing members of the European Parliament called for her immediate resignation.

Ursula von der Leyen dismissed such an idea and supported von Schnurbein. According to Politico, the Commission offered unequivocal support: "The president supports all the coordinators in their difficult and challenging work," a Commission spokesperson told Politico, adding that there would be "no comment whatsoever on unverified leaks from a closed meeting." An earlier attempt in 2019 to remove von Schnurbein also failed.

Close to 80 Jewish organisations issued a strong open letter to President von der Leyen in support of von Schnurbein.

According to Haaretz, there are allegation that she has arbitrarily excluded Jewish left-wing and non organizations from forums organized by the European Commission.

== Personal life ==
Von Schnurbein is married and has four children. She spent the 2017–2018 academic year at the European University Institute in Florence to research on contemporary antisemitism.

== Awards ==
- Honorary Doctorate from Ben-Gurion University of the Negev, 2024
- American Jewish Committee David Harris Award 2023
- Rabbi Moshe Rosen Prize, Conference of European Rabbis, 2022
- Marietta and Friedrich Torberg Medal, from the Jewish Community of Vienna (IKG), 2021
- Top 100 people positively influencing Jewish life (2020), the Algemeiner
- Human Rights Prize, B'nai B'rith Europe, 2018

== See also ==
- Office of the Special Envoy to Monitor and Combat Antisemitism, Special Envoy in the United States
- List of combating antisemitism envoys
