= Holocaust by Bullets =

2008 memoir by Patrick Desbois

The Holocaust by Bullets
- Author: Patrick Desbois
- Translator: Catherine Spencer
- Language: English
- Subject: The Holocaust
- Genre: Non-fiction
- Publisher: Palgrave Macmillan
- Publication date: August 2008
- Media type: Book
- Pages: 272
- ISBN: 978-0-230-60617-3

The Holocaust by Bullets is a memoir and investigation written by Father Patrick Desbois, a French priest who uncovered the truth behind the murder of 1.5 million Jews in the occupied Soviet Union by Nazi and Nazi-aligned forces. Published in 2008, the book details Desbois’ journey in locating and studying the Holocaust in Eastern Europe. In the opening chapters, Desbois describes his grandfather's story of incarceration, an experience that drove him to study the Holocaust. The book features some of the hundreds of testimonies of witnesses or requisitioned villagers who were present at mass executions that Desbois collected with the help of translators, historians, and archival scholars. This memoir brings to light the emotional impacts of genocide and the intimate, human dimensions of the Nazi extermination.

== Background ==
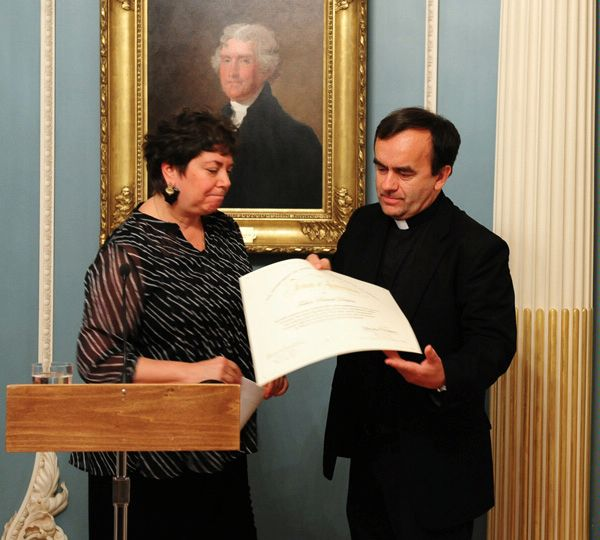
Hannah Rosenthal recognizes the work of Father Patrick Desbois in 2012

The Holocaust by Bullets was translated into English and published by Palgrave MacMillan in 2008, whilst the French version, La Shoah par Balles, was published in 2019. The publication of the English version was supported by the United States Holocaust Memorial Museum.

Prior to writing his book, between 1992 and 1999, Fr Patrick Desbois was the Secretary of Jewish Relations for Cardinals Albert Decourtray, Jean Balland and Louis-Marie Billé. He was later appointed as secretary to the French Conference of Bishops for Relations with the Jewish community from 1999 to 2016. In 2004, he founded Yahad-In Unum to locate the sites of mass graves of Jewish victims of the Holocaust in Eastern Europe.

Desbois' interest in the Holocaust was inspired by his grandfather, who was deported to a Nazi prison camp in Ukraine named Rawa Ruska in July 1942. Forced to witness the suffering of the Jews in Camp 325, his grandfather rarely spoke of his time in the camp, prompting Desbois to investigate the story of the Jews on his own. After several visits to Rawa Ruska that began in 2002, and meeting close to a hundred villagers who witnessed mass executions in Ukraine, Desbois decided to commit his career to "search for the Jewish people". By the time he began writing the book, his team of translators, ballistic experts, historians, archival staff, photographers and drivers had conducted over 800 interviews in Ukraine, Belarus, Russia and Poland. To this day, Desbois' team continues to document mass graves in Eastern Europe.

When speaking to the Special Envoy to Monitor and Combat Anti-Semitism in 2011, Desbois describes his motivation for his work: "Finally, why [do] we stand? Because sometimes it's easy, sometimes it's not, sometimes it's freezing, sometimes there is no running water, because we need bodyguards. Why [do] we stand after so many years? I have the conviction that we cannot build a modern Europe, and perhaps a modern world, above thousands of mass graves of Jews, who have been killed like animals, buried like animals."

== Genre ==
The foreword of the Holocaust by Bullets was written by Paul Shapiro, Director of the Center for Advanced Holocaust Studies, U.S. Holocaust Memorial Museum in Washington, D.C. This book has been described by Major Travis W. Elms, a Judge Advocate of the US Army, as a "methodical piece" that "guides the reader through a complex period in World War II history". The memoir includes pictures of mass graves, villagers, the team and the investigation, as well as maps that detail the Nazi's invasion of the Soviet Union. Each chapter describes Desbois' story and introduction of the contextual history, whilst later chapters include eyewitness accounts in question and answer form.

== Synopsis ==
=== Origins of Desbois' work ===
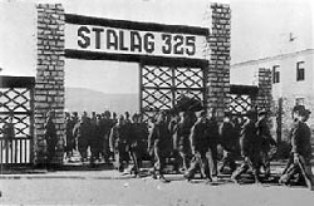
Stalag 325 in Rawa Ruska, the place where Desbois' grandfather was imprisoned during WWII

The opening chapters of the book detail the origins of his work. In Chapter I, he describes the story of his grandfather and other relatives who lived during WWII. His first visit to Poland in December 1990 reminded him of his grandfather's experience of being a prisoner of war in Rava-Ruska in modern-day Ukraine, and prompted a deep desire to uncover the story behind the murder of thousands of Jews. Debois then explains that during the next few years, he began to learn Hebrew, take classes about Judaism in Israel and about the mistreatment of Jews during WWII with Yad Vashem. It is during this period, explains Desbois, that he was connected to Dr. Charles Favre, an expert on Jewish-Catholic relations, public opinion and geopolitics, who served as his spiritual and academic mentor. Desbois credits this training for his position as one of the leading mediators with Jewish representatives for the Archbishop of Lyon. In his first trip to visit the Shoah, Desbois recalls his experience meeting with a village priest who had witnessed mass exterminations in Ukraine, a baker who delivered bread to extermination camps, a carpenter who created gas chambers, and a daughter of the mayor who coordinated the provisions to the death camps. He writes: "I realized then that there are witnesses to the Shoah who are not Jewish: neither perpetrators nor victims, but witnesses." Desbois describes this realization as a spur to his future work, one that lays the foundation for the rest of the book.

=== Witnesses to the execution ===
Detailing the experiences of witnesses is a core part of Desbois' work. For example, during his second visit to Rawa Ruska, the deputy mayor – Yaroslav – took Desbois to the mass grave of 1,200 Jews murdered in November 1943. The mayor had arranged for around one hundred witnesses to tell their story of what had happened during the Holocaust. One described the stream of blood coming from the pit after the execution, whilst others recall seeing the dismembered body of a woman on a tree after the pit was blown up with grenades. The latter witness was requisitioned by the Nazis to collect the body and place it in the pit. Each new witness, village and region, according to Desbois, led to discoveries. Desbois categorizes witnesses into three types: direct, indirect and requisitioned.

=== Human dimensions of Nazi extermination ===
Desbois recounts the human, living impact of Nazi extermination, as seen in multiple interviews with witnesses. In one interview in Khvavtiv Ukraine, Olena – a bride on the day of the execution – recalls the moment when a friend of her mother's shouted, "Olena, Olena, save me!" whilst being transported on a German military truck. Many other indirect witnesses had seen the police take Jews – their friends and neighbors – from their homes and these witnesses watched them disappear from the street. Anna Dychkant, a witness from Lviv, describes a summer in which Jews were murdered. A boy at her school shouted "farewell" as he was taken to be murdered behind a neighbor's house. Desbois describes that many witnesses reported that the pits "breathed" and moved for a few days as the remaining Jews suffocated to death. In addition, there were cases of direct witnesses who were present at the assassination. Some instances reported that Jews were murdered in the middle of towns, with the knowledge of most villagers. For example, Yaroslav Galan witnessed how Jews were ordered to dig their graves, and then shot. In another case, Adolf Wislovski – a witness from Lviv – recalls how Jews were murdered outside his house; he had counted 59 pits dug as mass graves over the six-month-long execution. A villager of Voskresenkoye, Olga Bitiouk, remembers the days she had hidden in a friend's attic to watch the killing of Jews, whose bodies were later dug up and burnt. Desbois mentions that most of his interviewees fell in the category of direct witnesses – and makes clear the personal trauma of each individual when recalling their story.

Villagers were not necessarily bystanders to the crime. In many cases, neighbors were requisitioned to serve the Nazis, cooking food, digging pits, and burying the bodies. One witness, Samuel Arabski, was requisitioned to fill a pit. As he attempted to do so, a hand coming out of the ground had "grabbed hold of his spade" and he had fainted. Others, usually farmers with carts, would be asked to gather clothes as the Jews undressed before being killed. Desbois also had the opportunity to interview Leon Wells, a famous survivor who worked in Yanovska – an extermination camp in Lviv. Wells, assisted by a commando of requisitioned youth, was ordered to pull out the gold teeth of Jews who had been dug up. There were 90,000 bodies. Other roles fulfilled by neighbors are outlined in Chapter X, including Ternivka, the "presser" – who had to walk on bodies of the Jews who were shot; Zobolottia, the seamstress – who had to patch up Jewish clothing so they could be sent to Germany, and Hanna Senikova, the girl whose aunt had been requisitioned as a cook by the Germans.

=== Steps of the Holocaust by bullets ===
In each village, the steps through which the Holocaust by bullets occurred were different. In certain cases, the Jews were asked to congregate in a common location, then loaded into trucks and taken to killing sites. Upon arrival, they were forced to take off their clothes and were shot in groups. Most of the time, the shooters were Nazis, but Desbois' interviews sometimes mention the requisitioning of prisoners of war or local police to murder Jews. In addition, most witnesses recall that the Nazis forced villagers or prisoners to collect rings, earrings and gold teeth that belonged to the Jews. Some villagers would later take the leftover clothing of Jews for themselves. One can see these steps depicted in the film Come and See, (dir. Elem Klimov, 1985) in which a town in Belarus is subject to these steps through which the Holocaust by bullets was executed.

=== Operation 1005: the cremation of Jews ===
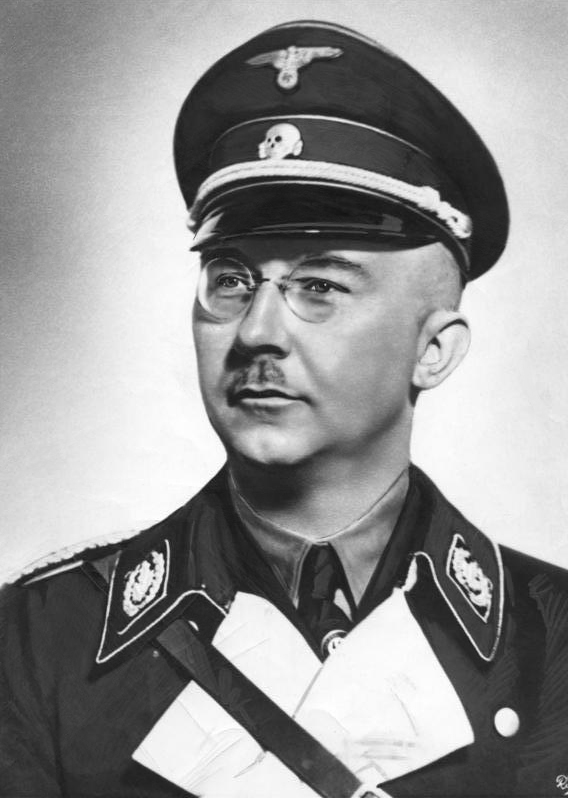
Heinrich Himmler, the Reichsführer of the Schutzstaffel who initiated Operation 1005

Desbois describes Operation 1005 in Chapter XVI, a plan ordered by Heinrich Himmler in 1942 to dig up the mass-graves and burn the victims' bodies in furnaces. Himmler was motivated by two key factors: anti-Semitism, which suggests that Jews had no right to Nazi soil, and hiding accountability, such that Soviet commissions could not establish proof of Nazi crimes. During Desbois' time in Ukraine, he had met men and women who had witnessed the smoke of the fires, some of which had to evacuate due to the pollution and smell. Maria, a villager of Voskresenskaya, saw the bodies of victims being dug up and cremated. She recounts that Soviet prisoners were responsible for the cremation of at least 2,000 people per day. "The flames went right up to the sky," Maria states.

=== Jewish survivors ===
Desbois also interviewed several witnesses who attempted to hide Jews in their houses. Galina Boulavka's mother, on her deathbed, tells the story of the young girl who she hid in the family home in Lubomil for weeks. One day, when the girl could no longer bear to stay inside, she went to play in the front yard. Soon enough, she was discovered by the Germans and shot against the front door. Olga Kokodishka, who lived in Novy Yaritchev during the war, recalls the day when her family was denounced for hiding Jews. The Germans searched their house, smashing their belongings, but could not find the Jews who had escaped from the back. Instead, the Germans shot and killed her father.

=== Interview methodology ===
Desbois explains in Chapter XI his research and interview methodology. His team would carry out historical research, such as studying German rulings, trials and depositions to understand the circumstances of the killing. Prior to each trip, his researcher Andrej Umansky would report on the narratives of German police or SS officers who had participated or observed the killings. After developing a rough idea of the dates of the executions and the names of the Nazi units responsible for the killings, they would proceed to interviews on the ground.

During each interview, Desbois would ask questions pertaining to the individual's family life, residence and age during the war, to recreate the atmosphere of the time. Specific, pointed questions that focused attention on what the witnesses heard and saw help them remember the events. Desbois describes that he sticks to concrete accounts of the events in order not to influence the testimony. In certain cases, Desbois had to "successfully skirt around the guilt [the interviewee] may have felt about receiving a Jewish garment,...or even about the simple fact of having been there when it occurred."

== Reception ==
The Holocaust by Bullets has been widely praised by historians and journalists. One common comment is the significance of Desbois' work in the wider realm of Holocaust studies. Major Travis W. Elms argues that Desbois' work should be widely read as it details the "personal account of how one Catholic became radically sensitized to the experience of Jews during the Holocaust." Elms states further that "[b]y recording this experience, Desbois has already made a lasting impact on Holocaust studies and Jewish-Catholic relations." In addition, Elms suggests that the book advocates for the protection of human rights during world conflict, and that it strives for an accurate portrayal of history. Similarly, the Library Journal mentions Desbois' evident passion for the subject, and how he has been successful in making an "outstanding contribution to Holocaust literature, uncovering new dimensions of the tragedy."

Others point out the difficulty of the task that Desbois has investigated. Deborah E Lipstadt, author of History on Trial: My Day in Court with a Holocaust Denier, describes the importance of Desbois' work from a Jewish perspective. She comments how, taking care of the dead is one of the most treasured acts in Jewish tradition, because it cannot be reciprocated. She continues, saying: "Father Patrick Desbois has performed this act of loving kindness not for one person but for hundreds of thousands of people who were murdered in cold blood. He has done so despite the fact that many people would have preferred this story never to be uncovered and others doubted that it ever could be done. His contribution to history and to human memory, as chronicled in this important book, is immeasurable."

Furthermore, religious sources comment on the contribution of Desbois' book to Christian– or Catholic–Jewish relations. Francis Cardinal George, O.M.I. Archbishop of Chicago, describes how Desbois' "Catholic faith, experiences of his own family, the support of the French bishops and the research capacities of the United States Holocaust Memorial Museum are enabling him to carry out a work of discovery, of healing and reconciliation." Similarly, the Christian Science Monitor describes Desbois as a "human bridge between the modern Jewish world and the Catholic Church" who has shaped the way the Holocaust will be remembered.

The book also received the 2008 National Jewish Book Award, a prestigious recognition that has also been awarded to books such as Nazis on the Run: How Hitler's Henchmen Fled Justice and The Jewish Enemy: Nazi Propaganda during World War II and the Holocaust.
