= SECCA =

SECCA may refer to:

- Southeastern Center for Contemporary Art
- The SECCA procedure, a surgical treatment for fecal incontinence.
- Forum of Special Envoys and Coordinators Combating Antisemitism (SECCA)
