= Global Antisemitism Review Act =

2004 United States law

Global Anti-Semitism Review Act of 2004
- Other short titles: To require a report on acts of anti-Semitism around the world
- Enacted by: the 108th United States Congress

Citations
- Public law: Pub. L. 107–56 (text) (PDF)
- Statutes at Large: 115 Stat. 272

Codification
- Acts amended: Foreign Assistance Act of 1961; International Religious Freedom Act of 1998

Legislative history
- Introduced in the Senate as S. 2292 by George Voinovich (R–OH) on April 7, 2004; Committee consideration by Senate Committee on Foreign Relations; House Committee on International Relations; Passed the Senate on May 7, 2004 (100-0); Passed the House on October 8, 2004; Signed into law by President George W. Bush on October 16, 2004

Global Antisemitism Review Act, officially the Global Anti-Semitism Review Act of 2004 is a U.S. law passed in 2004 that established the Office of the Special Envoy to Monitor and Combat Antisemitism.

== History ==
Congressman Tom Lantos (D-CA), the only Holocaust survivor in the U.S. House and the ranking member of the House International Relations Committee drafted the bill, introduced as HR 4230, in response to an international surge in antisemitism, especially in Europe. Lantos' bill called for the State Department to report annually on the status of Jews globally and would create an Office to Monitor and Combat Anti-Semitism within the State Department. It gained 33 co-sponsors, including Republican Ileana Ros-Lehtinen and Democrat John Lewis.

The act was opposed by the State Department under Secretary Colin Powell, which said it already included antisemitism in annual reports on Annual Report on International Religious Freedom and Country Reports on Human Rights Practices. A three-page State Department memo released in July suggested that reporting out one form of hatred for special attention would purportedly set a bad precedent and could be interpreted as favoritism. In response, Lantos said such opposition was reminiscent of the department's attitude toward Jews in the 1930s, when the U.S. was opposed to allow refugees from the Nazis into the country. He said the new ratings was not "favoring a group, but an issue of responding to a problem." Lantos sent a letter to Powell stating that "It is mind-boggling that the department would make such a dismissive and ignorant assessment of global antisemitism" and highlighted that State Department reports already contained special sections covering women, children, disabled people, laborers. and human rights NGOs.

Congressman Chris Smith (R-NJ) and Senator George Voinovich (R-OH) introduced a less strenuous version of Lantos' bill, which called for a one-time State Department report on antisemitism and required the inclusion of antisemitism in the State Department's Annual Report on International Religious Freedom and Country Reports on Human Rights Practices. The Smith and Voinovich's version did not create a new office.

Voinoich's version unanimously passed the U.S. Senate on May 7. The bill required the State Department to deliver a one-time report on international antisemitism to Congress by November 15. It also directs the State Department to include the special report's findings in its annual International Religious Freedom and Human Rights reports. However, it did not create a new office.

In September, Smith and Voinoich stepped up their efforts to advocate for the bill's passage amidst a push by Congressional Republicans to focus attention on antisemitism. The campaign kicked off on September 14 with a speech by Senator Rick Santorum. On September 23, the U.S. Senate passed legislation urging members of the Organization for Security and Cooperation in Europe (OSCE) to consider appointing a special envoy to ensure "sustained attention with respect to fulfilling OSCE commitments on the reporting of antisemitic crimes." On October 1, Lantos told The Forward that chances of the bill's passage were "very, very strong."

In the face of State Department opposition, Lantos and Smith entered into negotiations. On September 22, Smith agreed to accept Lantos's proposal. One component of support was an open letter signed organized by the David S. Wyman Institute for Holocaust Studies calling for Powell to support Lantos' bill. The letter was signed by 104 prominent Americans, including former Republican vice presidential nominee Jack Kemp, former United Nations ambassador Jeane Kirkpatrick, ex-CIA directorJames Woolsey and Pulitzer Prize-winning author Garry Wills. A group of religious leaders, former administration officials, academics, writers, and artists, sent a letter to Powell in September protesting the department's opposition to the Lantos bill.

President George W. Bush signed the bill into law while in Florida on October 16, 2004. In a speech, Bush stated that "Defending freedom also means disrupting the evil of anti-Semitism."

== Reactions ==
The American Jewish Committee supported the passage of a bill combatting antisemitism in principle, but did not endorse one version of the bill.

== Legacy ==
Secretary of State Condoleezza Rice appointed Republican congressional staffer Gregg Rickman as the first special envoy. Rickman was sworn in on May 22, 2006 and served until the end of the George W. Bush administration. The first periodic report on antisemitism, "Contemporary Global Antisemitism: A Report Provided to the United States Congress," was published in March 2008.

In 2021, the act was amended to elevate the Special Envoy to the rank of an ambassador, which means the position must be nominated by the U.S. President and confirmed by the U.S. Senate.

== See also ==
- List of combating antisemitism envoys
