= Elan Carr =

American lawyer and politician

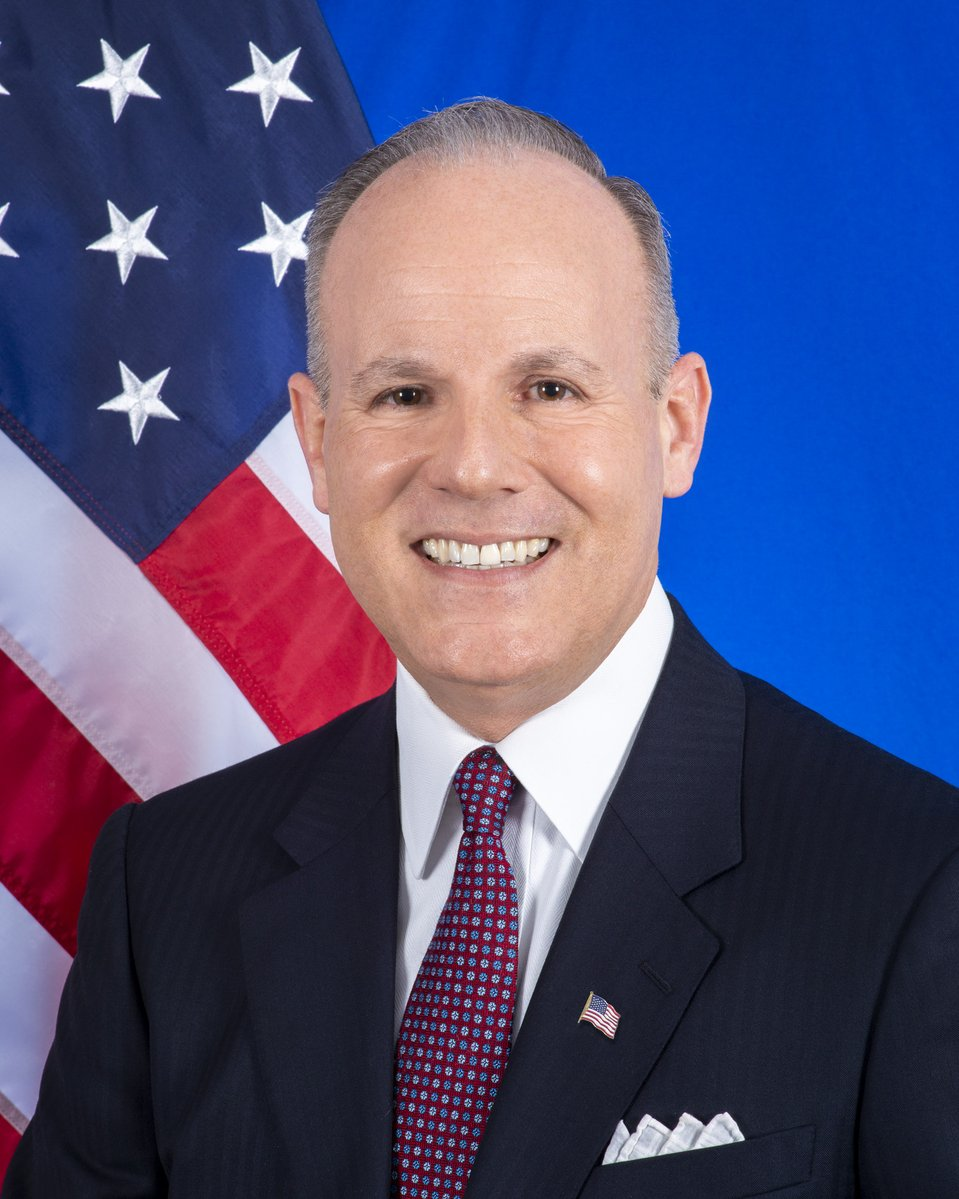
- Official portrait, 2019

United States Special Envoy for Monitoring and Combating anti-Semitism
- In office January 28, 2019 – January 20, 2021
- President: Donald Trump
- Preceded by: Ira Forman (2017)
- Succeeded by: Deborah Lipstadt

Personal details
- Born: Elan Somekh Carr; November 25, 1968 (age 57) Manhattan, New York, U.S.
- Party: Republican
- Spouse: Dahlia Carr
- Children: 3
- Education: University of California, Berkeley (BA); Northwestern University (JD)
- Occupation: Attorney, diplomat, CEO

Military service
- Allegiance: United States
- Branch/service: United States Army
- Years of service: 2001–2023
- Rank: Major
- Unit: Judge Advocate General's Corps

Elan Somekh Carr (born November 25, 1968) is an American lawyer, diplomat, politician, and chief executive. He is the CEO of the Israeli American Council. Previously, he served as the United States Special Envoy for Monitoring and Combating anti-Semitism under President Donald Trump from 2019 to 2021.

Before that appointment, Carr was a Deputy District Attorney in the Los Angeles County District Attorney's office. In 2014, he was the Republican candidate for the US House of Representatives, losing the general election to Ted Lieu. Carr is also an officer in the Judge Advocate General's Corps in the U.S. Army Reserve and an Iraq War veteran.

== Political candidacies ==
In 2014, Carr ran as a Republican to succeed retiring Congressman Henry Waxman, representing California's 33rd congressional district in the United States House of Representatives. In the heavily Democratic district, his message centered on bipartisan solutions to the country's problems and he spoke about the support he was receiving from Democrats.

In the June nonpartisan blanket primary, he placed first, receiving approximately 21% of the votes cast, defeating all Democratic candidates, who split the Democratic vote in the district.

In the November general election, Carr faced Democratic state senator Ted Lieu. Lieu defeated Carr, securing 59.2% of the vote to Carr's 40.8%.

In 2016, Carr was a candidate to represent the 5th Supervisorial District on the Los Angeles County Board of Supervisors. Republican donor Sheldon Adelson contributed $100,000 to an independent expenditure political action committee in support of Carr's candidacy. Carr failed to advance in the June primary.

== Personal life ==
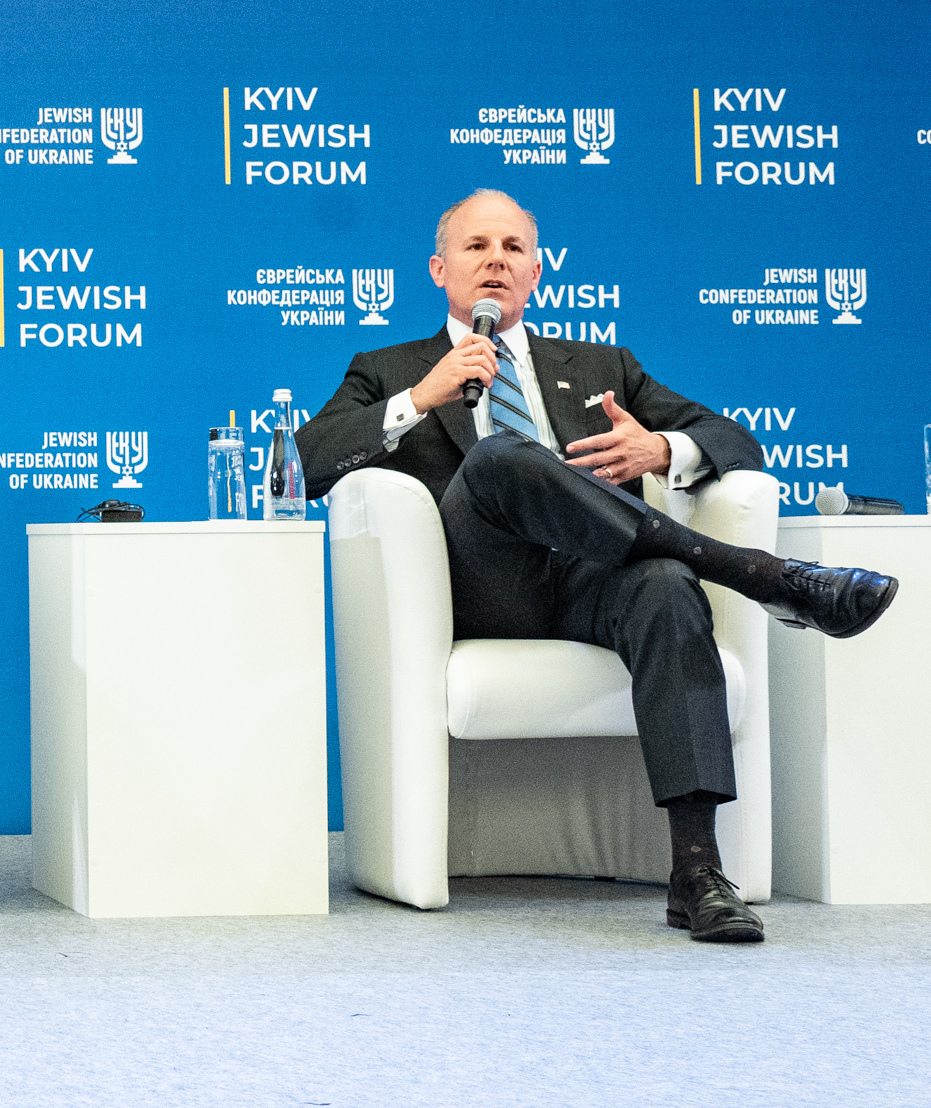
Carr speaking in 2019

Carr is Jewish. His maternal grandfather, a relative of Baghdad rabbinical leader Abdallah Somekh, was arrested during widespread antisemitic persecution of Iraq's Jewish community during the time of the founding of the state of Israel in 1948. He was convicted in a show trials and sentenced to five years in prison.

During Carr's Iraq War service, he helped lead an anti-terrorism team in missions throughout Iraq, prosecute terrorists who had attacked U.S soldiers in the Central Criminal Court of Iraq, and train Iraqi judges and lawyers on constitutional law and criminal defense. He also led Jewish services in the former presidential palace of Saddam Hussein in Baghdad, including by lighting a Hanukkah menorah in the first Hanukkah after the liberation of Baghdad in 2003.

Carr's mother fled from Iraq to Israel, while his stepfather fled from Nazi-occupied Bulgaria to Palestine. Both later immigrated to the United States. His biological father is second generation Irish and Italian descent.

Carr earned his bachelor's degree in philosophy and political science at the University of California, Berkeley and his J.D. degree at the Northwestern University Pritzker School of Law. He previously served as international president of the Alpha Epsilon Pi fraternity.

He and his wife Dahlia, a physician, met when they were introduced by a mutual friend hosting a Jewish singles event.

In 2022, Carr was a fellow at the USC Center for the Political Future.

== See also ==
- List of combating antisemitism envoys

Diplomatic posts
Vacant Title last held by Ira Forman	United States Special Envoy for Monitoring and Combating anti-Semitism; 2019–2021	Most recent
