= Jarrod Bernstein =

Counter Terrorism Official

Jarrod Neal Bernstein

Associate Director of Public Engagement, White House Office of Public Engagement
- In office October, 2011 – January 2013

Principal Deputy Assistant Secretary for Intergovernmental Affairs, Department of Homeland Security
- In office April 2009 – October 2011

Personal details
- Spouse: Hildy Kuryk
- Education: Johns Hopkins University; Fordham University School of Law (JD)
- Occupation: Public Affairs Consultant

Jarrod Neal Bernstein (born January 26, 1980) is former Obama Administration Counter Terrorism and Community Outreach Official. From 2017-2022 he served as the senior counsel to Thomas F Secunda and Secunda Family Foundation (SFF) and Director of the Bloomberg Resilience Team. Currently he is Of Counsel at Morrison Cohen and the Managing Director of 'First Due Advisory'. Bernstein is the former Associate Director of the White House Office of Public Engagement responsible for Jewish Outreach From 2014 to 2017, he was the Senior Vice President, Marketing, Communications & Strategy for CarePoint Health, a New Jersey–based patient-focused health care provider.

From April 2009 to September 2011 Bernstein served first as the Local Affairs and then as Principal Deputy Assistant Secretary for Intergovernmental Affairs for the United States Department of Homeland Security. In this role, he coordinated DHS’s outreach to mayors and governors. During his tenure at DHS, Bernstein worked extensively on numerous responses to significant events and policy initiatives including the BP Deepwater Horizon Oil Spill, the earthquake in Haiti, as well as the dissemination of intelligence information to state and local governments during periods of increased threat.

In the aftermath of Hurricane Sandy, Bernstein was dispatched by the White House to New York City to help coordinate the federal government's response.

Prior to joining the Obama Administration, Bernstein served in the administration of New York Mayor Michael Bloomberg for seven years. He served as Deputy Commissioner of Community Affairs from 2007-2009. There he was responsible for community crisis management and outreach around mayoral programs. These outreach efforts involved working with diverse communities across the Five Boroughs of New York City to ensure community engagement in the policy process.

Prior to that, he was the Chief Spokesman and Senior Advisor to the Commissioner with the New York City Office of Emergency Management. He managed the citywide public information efforts around dozens of large scale emergencies including the 2003 blackout, multiple periods of heightened threat, multiple aircraft and boat crashes, dozens of building collapses, as well the 2006 anthrax scare. He was also responsible for writing New York's Emergency Public Information Plan, still in use today.

A New York native, Bernstein received his undergraduate education from Johns Hopkins University, a juris doctor from Fordham University School of Law, and a Certificate from the National Preparedness Leadership Initiative at Harvard's Kennedy School of Government. He currently lives in New York City with his wife, Hildy Kuryk, son Jake, and daughter Lily. Bernstein is a member of the Saltaire Volunteer Fire Company.
