= Yehuda Kaploun =

Israeli-American rabbi, businessman and political figure

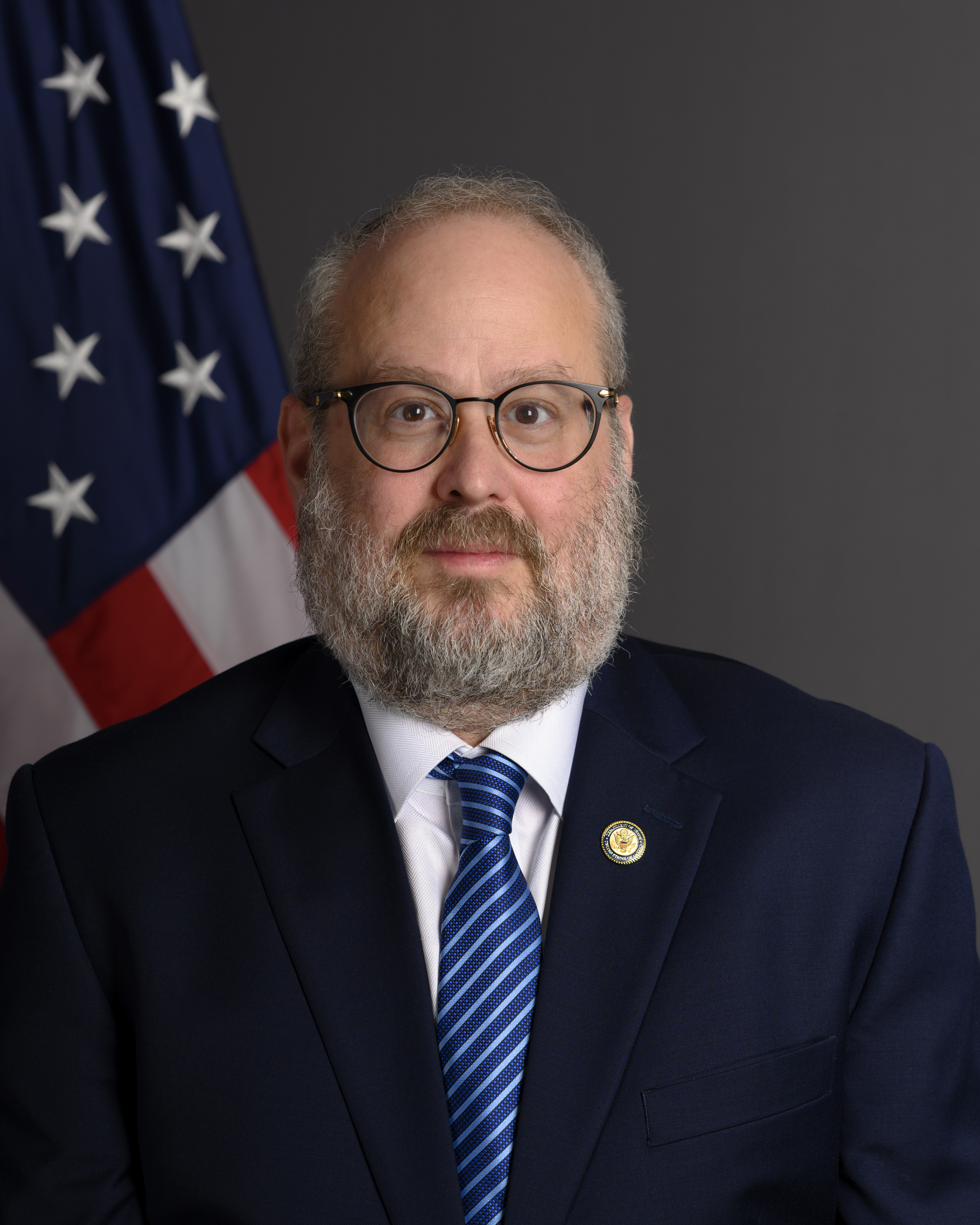
- Official portrait, 2025

United States Special Envoy to Monitor and Combat Antisemitism
- Incumbent
- Assumed office December 22, 2025
- President: Donald Trump
- Preceded by: Deborah Lipstadt

Personal details
- Born: 1968 (age 57–58) Kfar Chabad, Israel
- Citizenship: Israel; United States
- Party: Republican
- Spouse: Lea Kaploun
- Children: 1

Yehuda Kaploun (Hebrew: יהודה קפלון, born 1968) is an Israeli-American Chabad-Lubavitch rabbi, businessman, and conservative political figure. He was nominated as U.S. special envoy to monitor and combat antisemitism by President Donald Trump in May 2025. He was confirmed by the Senate on December 18, 2025 on a vote of 53–43.

== Biography ==
Kaploun was born in Kfar Chabad, Israel, to a Chabad-Lubavitch family. His parents were emissaries of the Lubavicher Rebbe. Later, his family moved to New Haven, Connecticut, where his father served as a rabbi and educator. He is the grandson of Reb Moshe Zalman Feiglin, who established a Chabad presence in Australia, and Rabbi Zvi Oster, who founded a beit midrash in Brooklyn, New York City in the 1920s. Kaploun lived in New York City at the time of the September 11th attacks in 2001, and volunteered at Ground Zero with Hatzalah.

He lives in Miami, Florida and is married. He was a friend to the late Elie Wiesel.

A lawsuit filed in 2023 alleges that Kaploun had an affair with a married woman he met at a synagogue in Miami Beach. The lawsuit was settled shortly before his nomination as U.S. special envoy to monitor and combat antisemitism was announced. Kaploun filed his own lawsuit, accusing the woman's husband of intimidation and harassment. The woman's husband was granted a restraining order from Kaploun. Kaploun denies that the affair occurred.

== Political involvement ==
Kaploun claims a long standing relationship with Trump that was struck up while they both lived in New York, but his first recorded involvement with him was a 2018 demonstration of a water collecting technology from Israeli startup Watergen, of which he was upper management, at Mar-a-Lago. In 2020, he held a campaign event aimed at Jewish leaders for Trump that was attended by Mike Pence.

He is a friend of conservative megadonor Miriam Adelson, who was the third largest donor to Trump's 2024 campaign with donations totaling $106 million dollars, and her late husband, Sheldon Adelson. Kaploun was nominated as U.S. special envoy to monitor and combat antisemitism by Donald Trump in May 2025.

He has expressed support for President Trump's desire to remove accreditation and funding from educational institutions that do not sufficiently punish students who act in support of Palestinians. He has stated universities that tolerate "Jew-free zones" will face consequences. This statement is seemingly referencing now debunked stories appearing in conservative media stating that areas of Berkeley's campus had been marked as off limit to Jewish people during pro-Palestinian protests.
