= Hildy Kuryk =

American businessman (born 1977)

National Finance Director, Democratic National Committee
- In office July 2011 – January 2013

Personal details
- Education: Vanderbilt University
- Occupation: Public Relations Professional

Hildy Kuryk (born September 30, 1977) is a partner at Artemis Strategies and the former National Finance Director of the Democratic National Committee. She also previously served as the Director of Communications for Vogue Magazine. In 2011, Kuryk was named one of Politico's "50 Politicos to Watch: Fundraisers".

== Political career ==
Kuryk began her career in the White House Office of Legislative Affairs during the Clinton Administration. She was then hired as a finance assistant to the Democratic Senatorial Campaign Committee. In 2004, Kuryk worked for former U.S. Senator Tom Daschle and on Dick Gephardt's presidential campaign. In 2006, Kuryk worked for Charlie King's New York Attorney General campaign. She then started her own business.

Throughout Barack Obama's first presidential campaign, Kuryk worked on an east coast fundraising strategy for the then-candidate. By June 2007, she was senior New York finance consultant for the campaign.

From 2009 to 2010 Kuryk served as deputy finance director at the Democratic National Committee, and was promoted to national finance director in April 2011 where she acted as a liaison between the organization and key donors and stakeholders. The same year, Kuryk was named one of Politico's "50 Politicos to Watch" for her work on the Obama campaign and at the Democratic National Committee. After leaving her post at the DNC in 2012, Kuryk continued to act as a consultant for the organization throughout the beginning of 2013.

She is also a co-chair on the advisory board of Organizing for Action.

== Vogue ==
In April 2013, Kuryk was hired as Vogue magazine's director of communications.

== Personal life ==
Kuryk was married to Jarrod Bernstein in June 2007 and currently resides in New York City.
