= Ira Forman =

American diplomat (born 1952)

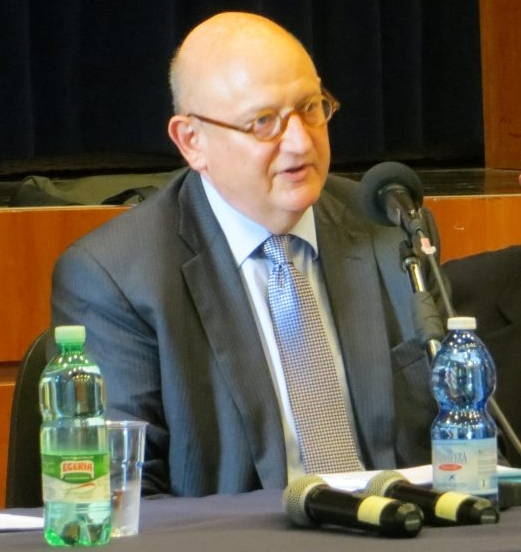
- U.S. Special Envoy for Monitoring and Combating anti-Semitism Ira Forman speaking at a panel discussion at John Cabot University on the 50th anniversary of the release of Nostra Aetate

United States Special Envoy for Monitoring and Combating anti-Semitism
- In office May 20, 2013 – January 20, 2017
- President: Barack Obama
- Preceded by: Michael Kozak (acting)
- Succeeded by: Elan Carr

Personal details
- Born: 1952 (age 73–74)
- Education: Harvard University; Stanford University

Ira N. Forman (born February 28, 1952) is a former executive director of the National Jewish Democratic Council from January 1996 through June 2010. From May 2013 until January 2017 he served as the United States Special Envoy for Monitoring and Combating anti-Semitism.

== Education and career ==
In 1974, Forman graduated magna cum laude from Harvard College, where he majored in Government.

Forman started his career in 1977 working as a legislative liaison for AIPAC. His title was political director. He stayed with AIPAC until 1981, when he left to go to Stanford University, where he completed an MBA in 1983.

After completing his MBA went to work for the National PAC as the New York office director, which he continued until 1985.

From 1990 to 1993, he served as a fellow at the Center for National Policy where he worked on the volume "Democrats and The American Idea: A Bicentennial Appraisal". He left the Center for National Policy to serve as the director of congressional relations in the Office of Personnel Management of the Clinton Administration.

He left the Clinton Administration in January 1996 when he became the executive director of the National Jewish Democratic Council.

In September 2011, Forman was named Jewish outreach director for President Obama's 2012 Reelection Campaign.

In May 2013, Secretary of State John Kerry appointed Forman as the U.S. Special Envoy of the Office to Monitor and Combat Anti-Semitism. He served in the position until January 20, 2017.

In 2021, Forman was reportedly considered by the Biden administration to again head the Office to Monitor and Combat Anti-Semitism, which was now an ambassadorship.

== Personal life ==
Forman and his wife, Caryn Pass, have three children, and live in Washington, D.C.

== See also ==
- List of combating antisemitism envoys

Diplomatic posts
| Preceded by Michael Kozak (acting) | United States Special Envoy for Monitoring and Combating anti-Semitism; 2013–2017 | Succeeded by Elan Carr |
