= White House Jewish Liaison =

US diplomatic position

The White House staff position of liaison to the American Jewish community (popularly known as the White House Jewish Liaison) is a role charged with serving as a presidential administration's voice to the community and gathering the community's consensus viewpoint on issues affecting it for the benefit of White House policymakers. It has existed at least as early as the Carter administration.

At times, the post has operated within the White House Office of Public Liaison (previously renamed as the Office of Public Engagement and Intergovernmental Affairs during the Obama Administration), and its formal title has depended on the rank of the person holding it. Thus, liaisons have held the position of Administrative Assistant for Jewish Affairs, Special Adviser for Jewish Affairs, Deputy Chief of Staff for Jewish Affairs, or Director of Jewish Outreach. During the most recent filling of the post, in the Obama Administration, the position's title was Associate Director of Public Engagement. At other times, the post has been held by persons outside of the Public Liaison Office.

The position is a difficult one to hold. The liaison must be in contact with Jewish organization leaders who believe that they should be able to interact with White House policymakers as the need arises. The liaison must also gather consensus from, and represent the Administration to, an American Jewish community that is deeply divided internally on many major issues, including foreign policy, such as the method of achieving Mideast peace, and domestic policy, like school vouchers for parochial schools.

In recent years, the position has regularly been handled by younger staffers holding their first jobs in the executive branch, with little power, and frequently many years younger than the American Jewish community organizational leaders to whom they represent the Administration viewpoint. During the Trump Administration, the position was left unfilled, with no intent to formally fill it.

== Liaisons ==
=== Carter administration ===
In 1978, Carter administration Jewish liaison Mark Siegel resigned the position after he became distressed with the administration's position towards Israel and Middle East policy and felt unable to influence it.

=== Reagan administration ===
Marshall Breger was President Ronald Reagan's Jewish liaison. He was involved in explaining to White House chief of staff Donald Regan why Jews were angry over Reagan's 1985 visit to a Bitburg, West Germany cemetery that included the graves of Waffen-SS soldiers. The position was a strong one in the Reagan and Clinton administrations; the position was shuffled relatively more often during the George W. Bush administration.

=== Clinton administration ===
Amy Zisook of Chicago served as Jewish liaison early in the Clinton Administration, followed by fellow Chicagoan Jay Footlik. Footlik later was a candidate for Congress in Illinois's 10th congressional district, losing to Dan Seals in the primary in 2008. Other Jewish liaisons were Jeanne Ellinport and Deborah Mohile, who served as Jewish liaison in the second term of the Clinton Administration.

=== George W. Bush administration ===
During the Bush Administration, seven people held the position of White House Liaison to the Jewish community.

The first liaisons during the Bush Administration, including Adam Goldman, HHS Deputy Secretary Tevi Troy, and others, were said to have angered more liberal leaders of American Jewish organizations by allegedly bypassing their counsel in favor of more conservative Jews, functioning as a gatekeeper.

Additional Jewish liaisons in the Bush White House included researcher and scheduler Jeff Berkowitz; staff assistant Jay Zeidman, the son of U.S. Holocaust Memorial Museum Council chair Fred Zeidman; speechwriter Noam Neusner, son of Jacob Neusner, a prominent rabbi and author; and special policy assistant to the President, Jeremy Katz. Troy left to work on the Bush 2004 reelection campaign, while both Berkowitz and Zeidman left to join 2008 Republican presidential campaigns.

The last liaison of the Bush Administration was Scott Arogeti.

=== Obama administration ===
During the Presidential transition of Barack Obama, at least five candidates were interested in the position, including Obama campaign foreign policy advisor Eric Lynn, Hillary Clinton campaign Jewish coordinator Josh Kram, Robert Wexler foreign policy advisor Halie Soifer, Ron Klein legislative director Mira Kogen Resnick, and Amtrak deputy general counsel Jonathan Meyer. The post was initially co-held by Susan Sher, chief of staff to the First Lady, and Danielle Borrin, who held the position of Special Assistant for Intergovernmental Affairs and Public Engagement to Vice President Joe Biden. Sher left the White House in January 2011.

In September 2011, it was announced that Jarrod Bernstein would be joining the White House Office of Public Engagement as the Director of Jewish Outreach. After Bernstein stepped down in January 2013, the role was handled on an interim basis by Zach Kelly, before being assigned to Matt Nosanchuk. Nosanchuk had previously held the position of Senior Counsel in the Civil Rights Division of the Department of Justice, where he worked on DOMA litigation. Nosanchuk's title as Jewish Liaison was Associate Director for Jewish Outreach in the White House Office of Public Engagement.

After three years in the position, Nosanchuk was succeeded in May 2016 by former State Department staffer Chanan Weissman, the first Orthodox Jew to hold the position in a Democratic administration.

=== Trump administration ===
Six months into his presidency, President Trump had not appointed a Jewish liaison, and a senior administration official told the media that the White House had no plans to fill the post. The president's special representative for international negotiations, Jason Greenblatt, informally acted as a conduit for contact with the organized American Jewish community.

Previous Jewish liaisons from the George W. Bush and Obama administrations spoke to the press to discuss the importance of the post and called for an appointment to be made. Senior leaders from Jewish community described their concerns over the effects of the situation.

A bipartisan group of 44 U.S. Representatives sent President Trump a letter on June 30, 2017, calling for him to appoint a Jewish liaison. Linked to those concerns were also calls for President Trump to appoint an antisemitism envoy, a post required to be filled by statute, and a July 2017 letter to President Trump by Senator Ben Cardin of Maryland also called for him to fill both posts.

In August 2017, 11 former Jewish liaisons, from the Reagan, Clinton, George W. Bush, and Obama administrations, issued an open letter describing President Trump's reactions to the violence in Charlottesville and other examples of antisemitism as showing "that he neither understands his responsibilities nor the nature of the ancient hatred of anti-Semitism and other forms of hate."

The liaisons' letter described Trump's "equivocation and unwillingness to speak clearly, without restraint, against blatant examples of racism, anti-Semitism and related manifestations of hate, as well as his refusal to lay blame for violence, [as] anathema to the best traditions of his office and to the examples set by the presidents we served," and as "exposing not just Jews but all Americans to greater danger."

=== Biden administration ===
In August 2021, Biden made Chanan Weissman, a National Security Council staffer who had served as Jewish liaison during the Obama administration, the White House liaison to the Jewish community. In 2022 he was succeeded by Shelley Greenspan, policy advisor for partnerships and global engagement at the National Security Council.
