= Bureau of Democracy, Human Rights, and Labor =

Bureau within the United States Department of State

- Seal of the United States Department of State

Bureau overview
- Formed: 1977; 49 years ago
- Jurisdiction: Executive branch of the United States
- Employees: 100 (as of 2003)
- Annual budget: $38.5 million (As of 2003)
- Bureau executive: Riley Barnes, Assistant Secretary of State for Democracy, Human Rights, and Labor
- Parent department: U.S. Department of State

The Bureau of Democracy, Human Rights and Labor Affairs (DRL) is a bureau within the United States Department of State. The bureau is under the purview of the Under Secretary of State for Foreign Assistance, Humanitarian Affairs and Religious Freedom.

== History ==
The bureau was formerly known as the Bureau of Human Rights and Humanitarian Affairs, but was reorganized and renamed in 1994, to reflect both a broader sweep and a more focused approach to the interlocking issues of human rights, worker rights, and democracy.

The DRL provides financial support to the Tor network (The Onion Router) since 2011.

In 1982, the State Department asserted that "Where it has been possible to assign responsibility [for killings in Guatemala] it appears more likely that in the majority of cases the insurgents … have been guilty." However, US intelligence reports found the opposite.

In 2026, the DRL announced that it would give grants of up to $3 million to groups "Developing Civilizational Bonds, Democratic Resilience, and Rule of Law in Europe". This is part of a Trump administration proposal to use DRL funding to give sole source grants to conservative-led European groups including the Free Speech Union International and Jacob Rees-Mogg-founded 878 Research in the United Kingdom.

== Functions ==
DRL's responsibilities include promoting democracy in U.S. and around the world, formulating U.S. human rights policies, and coordinating policy in human rights-related labor issues. The Office to Monitor and Combat Anti-Semitism is a separate agency included in the Bureau.

The Bureau is responsible for producing annual reports on the countries of the world with regard to religious freedom through its Office of International Religious Freedom and human rights. It also administers the U.S. Human Rights and Democracy Fund (HRDF), which is DRL's flagship program.

Examples of DRL's human rights advocacy in foreign locations include China, the Middle East, and Russia.

In addition to its advocacy and reporting roles, the Bureau operates within the framework of U.S. foreign policy priorities and is subject to congressional oversight and public accountability.

== Organization ==
The head of the Bureau is the Assistant Secretary of State for Democracy, Human Rights, and Labor, currently Riley Barnes.

The Bureau of Democracy, Human Rights, and Labor is divided into six offices.

- Office of Natural Rights
- Office of Reports and Sanctions – Prepares the State Department's annual Country Reports on Human Rights
- Office of Free Markets and Fair Labor
- Office of International Religious Freedom – Supports the United States Ambassador-at-Large for International Religious Freedom
- Office to Monitor and Combat Trafficking in Persons
- Office to Monitor and Combat Antisemitism
