= Operation Safehaven =

- Operation name: Operation Safehaven

Participants
- Executed by: United States Immigration and Customs Enforcement

Mission
- Target: person's affiliated with the warez scene

Timeline
- Date executed: April 2003

Results
- Suspects: 20
- Convictions: 7*

Operation Safehaven was a fifteen-month investigation conducted by the United States Immigration and Customs Enforcement ("ICE") in conjunction with the U.S. Attorney's Office for the District of Connecticut and the Department of Justice against those affiliated with the warez scene.

In April 2003, over twenty search warrants were simultaneously executed, resulting in the seizure of dozens of computers and file servers, including what the United States government reported as "the largest warez site ever seized in the United States to date."

== Cases ==
=== U.S. v. Myers et al. (D. Conn.) ===
Travis Myers, 29, of Yakima, Washington; Terry Katz, 26, of Yorktown Heights, New York; Walter Kapechuk, 55, of Schenectady, New York; and Warren Willsey, 53, of East Berne, New York, all waived indictment and pleaded guilty to charges of Conspiracy to Commit Criminal Copyright Infringement on October 2, 2003. These were the first convictions stemming from the operation. Myers admitted to being a courier and a member of several leading warez groups, including "DrinkOrDie." Katz admitted to being a site operator. Kapechuk admitted to running a site at SUNY Albany. Willsey admitted to assisting Kapechuk. All but Willsey faced maximum sentences of five years. Willsey faced a maximum sentence of one year.

=== U.S. v. Singh (D. Conn.) ===
Manpreet Singh, 22, of Middleburg Heights, Ohio, pleaded guilty to the charge of conspiracy to commit criminal copyright infringement on February 20, 2004. He admitted to being a courier for the groups "We Love Warez" ("WLW") and "pHASE." The maximum sentence is five years in prison. He was scheduled to be sentenced in May, 2004.

=== U.S. v. Perello (E.D. Tex.) ===
Pleaded guilty to a single count of conspiracy to commit criminal copyright infringement on November 21, 2005.

=== U.S. v. Pine (D. Conn.) ===
Pleaded guilty to a single count of conspiracy to commit criminal copyright infringement on November 22, 2005.

=== U.S. v. Brink (D. Me.) ===
Kurt M. Brink, 25, of Portland, Maine, pleaded guilty on September 8, 2005 to conspiring to commit criminal copyright infringement. Sentenced to three years of probation, ordered to perform 300 hours of community service, and to pay a fine in the amount of $6,000 on December 12, 2005.

=== U.S. v. Carter (N.D. Cal.) ===
Pleaded guilty to a single count of conspiracy to commit criminal copyright infringement on December 12, 2005.

=== U.S. v. Szoke (D. Conn.) ===
Carole Szoke, 62, of Nazareth, Pennsylvania, pleaded guilty on September 27, 2005. Sentenced to three years of probation, ordered to perform 312 hours of community service, and to pay a fine in the amount of $2,000 on December 22, 2005.
