= Office of the Special Envoy to Monitor and Combat Antisemitism =

U.S. diplomatic office

- Seal of the United States Department of State

Agency overview
- Formed: 2004; 22 years ago
- Jurisdiction: Executive branch of the United States
- Annual budget: $1.75 million (2024)
- Agency executive: Yehuda Kaploun, special envoy (ambassador-at-large)
- Parent department: U.S. Department of State
- Website: Official Website

The Office of the Special Envoy to Monitor and Combat Antisemitism (formerly the Office to Monitor and Combat Anti-Semitism) is an office of the Under Secretary of State for Civilian Security, Democracy, and Human Rights at the United States Department of State. The office "advances U.S. foreign policy on antisemitism" by developing and implementing policies and projects to support efforts to combat antisemitism.

The office was established by the Global Antisemitism Review Act of 2004 and is headed by the special envoy for monitoring and combating antisemitism (SEAS), who reports to the US secretary of state. Congressional staffer Gregg Rickman was sworn in as the first special envoy in 2006. In 2021, the special envoy was elevated to an ambassador-at-large nominated by the president and confirmed by the Senate. The position was previously appointed by the secretary of state.

== Responsibilities ==
The office's responsibilities under U.S. federal law (22 U.S.C. § 2731) are:

- monitoring and combating acts of anti-semitism and anti-semitic incitement that occur in foreign countries;
- providing input on antisemitism for two annual reports issued by the State Department:

- Country Reports on Human Rights Practices
- Annual Report on International Religious Freedom

- consult[ing] with domestic and international nongovernmental organizations and multilateral organizations and institutions, as the special envoy considers appropriate

== History ==
=== Bush administration ===
In 2004, President George W. Bush signed the Global Anti-Semitism Review Act of 2004, creating an Office to Monitor and Combat Antisemitism reporting to the Assistant Secretary of State for Democracy, Human Rights, and Labor (DRL). The State Department under Colin Powell had opposed the legislation, introduced by Congressman Tom Lantos, on grounds that the department already compiled information about antisemitism in its annual human rights and religious freedom reports.

Secretary of State Condoleezza Rice appointed Republican congressional staffer Gregg Rickman as the first special envoy. Rickman was sworn in on May 22, 2006 and served until the end of the George W. Bush administration.

During his tenure, Rickmann was involved in obtaining U.S. visas for Yemeni Jews. In December 2007, Rickman traveled to Yemen to assess the condition of the Jewish community there and to investigate a report of abduction, forced conversion to Islam, and marriage of a young Yemenite woman. Over 60 Yemeni Jews were resettled in the United States due to the efforts of Rickman's office and organizations such as HIAS.

The first periodic report on antisemitism, "Contemporary Global Antisemitism: A Report Provided to the United States Congress," was published in March 2008.

=== Obama administration ===
Hannah Rosenthal served in the post under the Obama administration from November 23, 2009 to October 5, 2012. Rosenthal energetically expanded on Rickman's initiatives, issuing a more far-ranging report on global antisemitism in 2010, speaking broadly at conferences, and working closely with counterparts in the European Union and OSCE.

Rosenthal was praised for formalizing the office's work and criteria, and for her personal involvement against anti-semitic acts globally; however, she also received criticism from her predecessor Rickman and from Abraham Foxman of the Anti-Defamation League for including Muslim community leaders in joint activities against religious hatred.

Rosenthal was succeeded on an interim basis by career diplomat and former U.S. ambassador to Belarus Michael Kozak. Kozak served in the role until Ira Forman, the former executive director of the National Jewish Democratic Council, was sworn in as special envoy on May 20, 2013. He served until Obama's term in office ended in January 2017.

=== Trump administration ===
In June 2017, five months into the Trump administration, Secretary of State Rex Tillerson cast doubt on whether the post of special envoy would be filled during Trump's presidency. Members of the House and Senate publicly expressed concern that the position was unfilled and called for Trump to make an appointment, at the same time calling on Trump to fill the vacant position of White House Jewish liaison. Congressional concern over the vacancy continued to grow throughout 2018 and early 2019. On February 5, 2019, Secretary of State Mike Pompeo announced the appointment of Elan Carr, a Los Angeles County deputy district attorney who had served as an active duty officer in the United States Army Judge Advocate General's Corps.

=== Biden administration ===
In 2021, the special envoy was elevated to an ambassador-at-large nominated by the U.S. president and confirmed by the U.S. Senate. At the beginning of the Biden administration, the office's budget was $500,000 and operated with a skeletal staff of fewer than two full-time employees. Most of the office's positions are political appointees who leave when an administration ends.

On July 30, 2021, President Joe Biden nominated scholar Deborah Lipstadt for this role. Opposition from Senator Ron Johnson, whom she had tweeted was advocating "white supremacy/nationalism," delayed her nomination for many months. Her initial nomination expired at the end of the year.

Amidst the delays in confirming Lipstadt, the Biden administration named Aaron Keyak to the post of deputy special envoy to monitor and combat antisemitism. The deputy position was not at the ambassador level and did not require Senate confirmation.

After re-nomination, the Senate Foreign Relations Committee held hearings on her nomination on February 8, 2022. On March 29, 2022, the committee favorably reported her nomination out of committee. Her nomination was supported by all committee Democrats, as well as senators Mitt Romney and Marco Rubio. Her nomination was confirmed by voice vote on March 30, 2022, and she was sworn in on May 3, 2022.

Lipstadt was part of the Biden administration team that launched the U.S. National Strategy to Counter Antisemitism.

The 2024 U.S. federal budget increased funding for the office from $1.5 million to $1.75 million. The budget increase followed robust support from officials in the U.S. House and U.S. Senate.

== List of special envoys ==
#	Image	Name	Assumed office	Left office	President(s) served under
1		Gregg Rickman	May 22, 2006	January 20, 2009	George W. Bush
–		Office Vacant	January 20, 2009	November 23, 2009	Barack Obama
2		Hannah Rosenthal	November 23, 2009	October 5, 2012	Barack Obama
–		Michael Kozak (Acting)	October 5, 2012	May 20, 2013	Barack Obama
3		Ira Forman	May 20, 2013	January 20, 2017	Barack Obama
–		Office Vacant	January 20, 2017	February 5, 2019	Donald Trump
4		Elan Carr	February 5, 2019	January 20, 2021	Donald Trump
–		Office Vacant	January 20, 2021	May 3, 2022	Joe Biden
5		Deborah Lipstadt	May 3, 2022	January 20, 2025	Joe Biden
–		Office Vacant	January 20, 2025	December 22, 2025	Donald Trump
6		Yehuda Kaploun	December 22, 2025	present	Donald Trump

== See also ==
- White House Jewish Liaison
- List of combating antisemitism envoys
