= Patrick Desbois =

French Roman Catholic priest

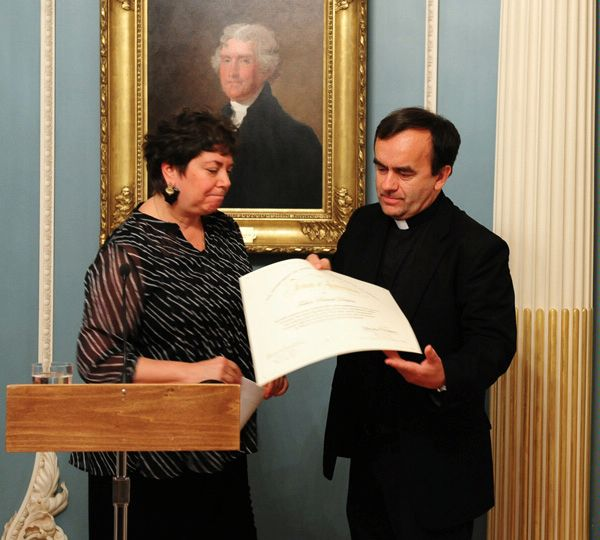
Hannah Rosenthal, U.S. Special Envoy to Monitor and Combat Anti-Semitism, recognizes the work of Father Patrick Desbois, President of the Yahad-In Unum Association of France, with a Tribute of Appreciation certificate (12 May 2011)

Patrick Desbois (born 1955, in Chalon-sur-Saône) is a French Roman Catholic priest, former head of the Commission for Relations with Judaism of the French Bishops' Conference and consultant to the Vatican. He is the founder of the Yahad-In Unum, an organization dedicated to locating the sites of mass graves of Jewish victims of the Nazi mobile-killing units in the former Soviet Union. He received the Légion d'honneur, France's highest honor and the Order of Merit of the Federal Republic of Germany (Cross of Merit 1st Class), Germany's highest honor for his work with Yahad-In Unum documenting the Holocaust in Eastern Europe.

== Education ==
Desbois attended the Université de Dijon, graduating with a degree in mathematics in 1977. He entered the Grand Seminary of Prado in 1981 and was ordained as a priest in 1986. That same year he earned a master's degree in theology from the Catholic University of Lyon. In 2024, he defended his PhD thesis in history at the Cergy-Pontoise University.

== Career ==
In 1978, Father Desbois worked as a math teacher for the French government in Africa. He later worked for Mother Teresa in Calcutta, where he helped set up homes for the dying. In 1986, he was ordained in the priesthood. In 1992, he became the Superior of the Grand Seminary in Prado, Lyon. From 1992-99, he served as Secretary of Jewish Relations for Cardinals Albert Decourtray, Jean Balland and Louis-Marie Billé. After he requested to work with the Jewish community of France, he was appointed secretary to the French conference of Bishops for Relations with the Jewish community from 1999 to 2016. Since 2016 he is a chargé de mission of the Cardinal of Paris. He serves as well as advisor to the Vatican on relations with Judaism.

In 2004, he joined leaders in the French Catholic and Jewish community in founding Yahad-In Unum ("together" in Hebrew and in Latin.) The organization's purpose is to further relations between Catholics and Jews. Its largest and most ambitious initiative is to locate the sites of mass graves of Jewish victims of the Nazi mobile killing units, the Einsatzgruppen, in the former Soviet republics and Eastern bloc.

His work has been sanctioned by the Pope, recognized and encouraged by the President of France and supported in Europe and the United States. Desbois has been internationally recognized for his extraordinary efforts; his awards include the Medal of Valor by the Simon Wiesenthal Center, the Roger E. Joseph Prize by Hebrew Union College, the Humanitarian Award by the U.S. Holocaust Memorial Museum, the Jan Karski Award by the American Jewish Committee, the B'nai B'rith International Award for Outstanding Contribution to Relations with the Jewish People and more recently, the National Jewish Book Award for his 2008 book Holocaust by Bullets (Palgrave-Macmillan). In 2013, he received the LBJ Moral Courage Award from the Holocaust Museum Houston.

Between 2015 and 2016, he taught at the Program for Jewish Civilization in the Edmund A. Walsh School of Foreign Service, Georgetown University as an adjunct professor. Since 2016 he is the inaugural holder of the Braman Endowed Professorship of the Practice of the Forensic Study of the Holocaust at the Center for Jewish Civilization at Georgetown University.

== Work with Yahad–In Unum ==
Father Desbois' interest in the Holocaust started at a young age, because his grandfather, who helped raise him, was a French soldier who had been deported to the Nazi prison camp in Rava-Ruska during World War II. His grandfather did not speak much of his time in the camp, and Father Desbois remained curious about the Holocaust and its victims.

As a consequence of his childhood interests, Father Desbois studied the Jewish faith while preparing for his ordination as a Catholic priest. He studied anti-semitism at Yad-Vashem, and later Jewish religion and culture with Dr Charles Favre, a leader in the French Jewish community. In 2002, he traveled to Ukraine, so he could see where his grandfather had been imprisoned during the war, and to pay respects at a memorial to the lives lost. Upon his arrival, he was shocked to discover that there existed not a single marking or commemoration to 1.25 million Jewish victims in all of Ukraine and Belarus. Speaking of his initial experience, Desbois narrated how:

In 2002, while traveling in Ukraine, he visited the site of his grandfather's imprisonment, Rawa-Ruska. Desbois knew that before World War II more than 15,000 Jews had lived in the town, but when he asked to see where they had been murdered, the mayor brushed him off and said no one knew anything about it. "How could more than 10,000 Jews be killed in the village and nobody knows?" he says. "I knew I needed to find out what happened. So I came back two times, three times, four times to Rawa-Ruska. And then the mayor lost the election and a new mayor was elected, much less Soviet."

The new mayor led Desbois to the forest where, Desbois says, approximately 50 elderly men and women of the village were gathered in a semicircle. "You are standing on the graves of the last 1,500 Jews of Rawa-Ruska," the mayor said. One by one the villagers stepped forward and told of their experiences during World War II. They told of how the Jews were marched out to this clearing, forced to dig steep pits and hand over their valuables before being shot. They recounted stories of how the Germans had forced them – children or teenagers at the time – to guard the Jews to prevent them from escaping, to cover the corpse-filled pits, to serve the German soldiers food and even bring them a gramophone so they could listen to music.

Desbois recalls one woman – "an old lady with a blue scarf" – who tearfully told him, "I was at my farm, I was 14, and they told me, 'Come, come' and I had to climb in the trees and pick up pieces of corpses and hide them with branches in the grave so that the next Jews will not see them. And then there arrived trucks and trucks and trucks of Jews from Rawa-Ruska."

Following these revelations, the villagers told Desbois they had never before publicly spoken of what had happened. Many asked the priest before he left, "Why are you coming so late? We have been waiting for you."

In order to right the egregious wrong, Father Desbois helped found Yahad-In Unum in 2004. The organization collects information about the mass killing of Jews and Roma in Ukraine, Russia, Belarus, Lithuania, Poland, Moldova and Romania between 1941 and 1944. Local contemporary witnesses are interviewed about the mass shootings which took place next to their home and the mass graves are located. Desbois estimates that there are no less than 1 million victims buried in 1,200 graves in Ukraine.

Desbois conducts many of the interviews with the witnesses himself (and with translators). Using metal detectors, Desbois and his team have unearthed German cartridges and bullets from the pits where bodies were thrown, as well as jewelry belonging to the victims. Criticisms leveled against Father Desbois include his acceptance of the confessions of complicity in war crimes by those whom he interviews. Professor Omer Bartov has stated: "Desbois doesn't ask a lot of the people that he speaks with. ...He gives the impression that it was the Germans doing all the killing, but in fact much of the organization of the genocide had a lot to do with auxiliary and local police forces. He is not interested in that". Paul Shapiro of the United States Holocaust Memorial Museum has countered that: "Some people have been critical of his methodology, but no one else is going out and doing this kind of work. It is easy to be critical; it is much harder to have the drive, stamina and commitment to go again and again to these places." In March 2014,

French president François Hollande praised the work of Father Desbois:

A moment ago, you honored Father Patrick Desbois. Through his own family history, he discovered the tragedy of Ukrainian Jews. He worked for the recognition of the 'Holocaust by Bullets' because the Holocaust had begun even before the camps, and furthermore, not only in Ukraine. It is very important to know how the genocidal process began, and how it came to the extermination camps.

In July 2017, Pope Francis sent a blessing and a message of encouragement to Father Desbois and Yahad-In Unum, writing:

The Holy Father encourages the members of ‘Yahad-In Unum’ to continue their struggle for the just recognition of the violence suffered by so many men and women belonging to different communities.

== Work on Documenting Genocide in Ukraine ==
Since March 2022, Patrick Desbois, has been investigating Russian war crimes and crimes against humanity in Ukraine. His organization has expanded its focus to Ukraine, where they have conducted hundreds of interviews with victims and witnesses of Russian atrocities.

Debois and his team have been documenting the systematic use of torture by Russian forces in areas such as Kherson, Irpin, and the Kharkiv region. According to his findings, the tortures were part of a broader strategy aimed at destroying Ukrainian identity. The goal was not only to extract information but to force victims to abandon their Ukrainian identity and align with Russian ideology. This form of psychological and physical abuse, including threats against family members, has been seen as a form of genocide.

One of the key reports released by "Yahad-In Unum" highlights the scale and methodical nature of these crimes. According to Desbois, the Russian forces aimed to erase the cultural and national identity of the Ukrainian people, which is a central element of genocide as defined by international law. In his research, Desbois draws parallels between the current situation in Ukraine and past genocides, including the tactics used by Nazi forces during the Holocaust and ISIS against the Yazidis.

Desbois' organization is working with international legal bodies, including the European Court of Human Rights and the Public Prosecutor General (Germany), to ensure that these crimes are documented and prosecuted. The organization has collected substantial evidence to support claims of genocide, including testimonies from victims who were subjected to brutal interrogations and psychological manipulation.

== Work with Action Yazidis ==
Action Yazidis is led by Patrick Desbois and collects the words of survivors to document and offer evidence of every step of the genocide of Yazidis by ISIL. Father Desbois was interviewed in Sinjar in 2016 by Lara Logan on an episode of 60 Minutes. Until July 2018, nearly 300 semi-directive interviews of Yazidi victims of all ages were conducted by Desbois and his team.

French president Emmanuel Macron praised his work in November 2017:

I salute the importance and seriousness of the highly documented work you and your association are doing to highlight the gravity of the tragedy of the Yazidi genocide.

Patrick Desbois' book reflecting the work of Action Yazidis (with Costel Nastasie: The Terrorist Factory – ISIS, the Yazidi Genocide, and Exporting Terror) was published in 2018.

== Bishop's committee for relations with Judaism ==
Due to his position as Director of the French Episcopal Conference's Committee for Relations with Judaism, Father Desbois has had to deal with the controversy following negationist comments made by Society of Saint Pius X (SSPX) bishop Richard Williamson. However, since Desbois has positive relations with the Jewish community, he has been able to maintain a great deal of trust during an otherwise difficult period.

== Awards ==
- May 1, 2007: he was honored by the American Jewish Committee with its "Jan Karski Award" for his "efforts to identify the mass graves of Jewish victims of the Shoah" and "his dedication to furthering understanding between Christians and Jews" Press Releases - American Jewish Committee.
- May 4, 2008: Rabbi David Ellenson handed over the Roger E. Joseph Prize to Desbois in New York .
- May 7, 2008: At the annual National Tribute Dinner the Simon Wiesenthal Center in Los Angeles presented the Jewish Medal of Valor to Desbois for his commitment to religious tolerance and cooperation .
- June 12, 2008: He received the Légion d'honneur for his work on the Holocaust
- October 9, 2008: He won the Shofar of Freedom Award Annual Shofar of Freedom Awards presented today
- 2008: He won a National Jewish Book Award for The Holocaust by Bullets: A Priest's Journey to Uncover the Truth Behind the Murder of 1.5 Million Jews
- May 12, 2009: honorary doctorate from the Bar Ilan University (Israel) Bar-Ilan University - BIU | Israel
- 2008: Recipient of the Jewish Book Council's National Jewish Book Award
- June 7, 2009: honorary doctorate from the Hebrew University (Israel) Catholic.co.il
- May 16, 2012: honorary doctorate from the New York University (United States) U.S. Supreme Court Justice Sonia Sotomayor to Speak at NYU’s 2012 Commencement
- May 3, 2013: honorary doctorate from the University of Winnipeg (Canada) Honouring Human Rights Leaders Roméo Dallaire and Father Patrick Desbois
- 2013: LBJ Moral Courage Award from the Holocaust Museum Houston
- March 4, 2014: he was honored by the Representative Council of French Jewish Institutions (Conseil Représentatif des Institutions juives de France) with its Award Le Prix du CRIF 2014 attribué au Père Patrick Desbois.
- May 21, 2015: honorary doctorate from the Jewish Theological Seminary of America (United States) The Jewish Theological Seminary - JTS Announces 2015 Commencement Honorary Degree Recipients
- April 28, 2017: honorary doctorate from the St. Francis College (United States)News Post
- October 24, 2017: Tom Lantos Human Rights Prize from the Lantos Foundation 2017 Prize - Father Patrick Desbois
- November 8, 2018: Anti-Defamation League Award at the ADL In Concert Against Hate
- March 26, 2019: Raphael Lemkin Award for exemplary work in the fight against genocide in honor of his dedication to investigating and exposing crimes of genocide around the world from the World Jewish Congress and the Permanent Mission of Rwanda to the United Nations World Jewish Congress
- January 25, 2023: Annetje Fels-Kupferschmidt Award from the Dutch Auschwitz Committee Nooit Meer Auschwitz lezing
- June 12, 2023: Order of Merit of the Federal Republic of Germany (Cross of Merit 1st Class)
- February 5th, 2024: Eternal Flame award from the Ackerman Center for Holocaust Studies, University of Texas at DallasRenowned Researchers Highlight Holocaust Studies at 54th ASC
- July 11, 2025: Promotion to Officer of the Legion of Honour (Légion d'honneur)

== Publications (english) ==
- Father Patrick Desbois, The Holocaust by Bullets: A Priest's Journey to Uncover the Truth Behind the Murder of 1.5 Million Jews, English translation by Catherine Spencer. New York: Palgrave Macmillan, 2008. ISBN 978-0-230-61757-5 (trade paper edition)
- Father Patrick Desbois, In Broad Daylight: The Secret Procedures behind the Holocaust by Bullets, English translation by Hilary Reyl and Calvert Barksdale. New York: Skyhorse Publishing, 2018. ISBN 978-1-628-72857-6 (hardback)
- Father Patrick Desbois and Costel Nastasie, The Terrorist Factory: ISIS, the Yazidi Genocide, and Exporting Terror, English translation by. New York: Skyhorse Publishing, 2018. ISBN 978-1-628-72946-7 (hardback)

== See also ==
- Pontifical Commission for Religious Relations with the Jews
- Yahad-In Unum
