= Yahad-In Unum =

Organization founded to locate the graves of Jewish Holocaust victims

Yahad - In Unum (YIU) (Yahad in Hebrew means "together"; In Unum in Latin means "in one”) is a French organization founded to locate the sites of mass graves of Jewish victims of the Nazi mobile killing units, especially the Einsatzgruppen, in Ukraine, Belarus, Russia, Poland, Lithuania, Latvia, Romania and Moldova. It was founded in Paris in 2004 by leaders in the French Roman Catholic and Jewish communities. YIU is led by Father Patrick Desbois, a Catholic priest whose grandfather was a French soldier deported to the Nazi prison camp Rava-Ruska, located in a Ukrainian town that borders Poland. Its United States fundraising branch is known as the American Friends of Yahad - In Unum.

== Leadership ==
Father Patrick Desbois is the director of the Episcopal Committee for Relations with Judaism. His work on Catholic-Jewish relations has frequently received international recognition; he has received the Légion d'honneur from French president, Nicolas Sarkozy, and been awarded the Medal of Valor by the Simon Wiesenthal Center, the Roger E. Joseph Prize by Hebrew Union College, the Humanitarian Award by the U.S. Holocaust Memorial Museum, the Jan Karski Award by the American Jewish Committee, the B'nai B'rith International Award for Outstanding Contributions to Relations with the Jewish People and the National Jewish Book Award for his 2008 book Holocaust by Bullets (Palgrave-Macmillan).

In 2009, he received honorary doctorates from Hebrew University and Bar Ilan, 2012 from the New York University.

Dr. Richard Prasquier is the vice president of the Yahad-In Unum Board. He is the president of the Representative Council of French Jewish Institutions and a member of the World Jewish Congress and the International Jewish Committee on Inter-religious Consultations.

David Black is the president of American Friends of Yahad-In Unum. Black is the associate vice president for Institutional Advancement at Yeshiva University. He is the former director of the Jewish Community Center in Manhattan and executive director of the Alliance Francaise in New York.

== Historical background ==
In less than two years, from June 1941 until the spring of 1943, an estimated 1.25 million Jews were massacred in the Soviet Union by Nazi mobile killing units, or Einsatzgruppen. The Einsatzgruppen rounded up the Jewish populations of the villages and towns they passed through, led them to the country-side and summarily executed them. The victims were buried (many of them still alive) in mass graves. Very little is known about these atrocities because there were so few survivors.

== Research ==
YIU seeks to find evidence of the massacres on the Eastern front and locate the mass graves of Jews killed by the Einsatzgruppen. YIU's objective is to counter the claims of Holocaust deniers who use the lack of official documentation of the murders to make claims about the validity of Holocaust evidence, and to account for the graves that remain undiscovered to pay respect to the dead.

YIU approaches its work on two fronts—archival research and research trips. The archival research is primarily undertaken by PhD and graduate students in the United States and Germany. The researchers spend several months at the United States Holocaust Memorial Museum, where they study the Soviet archives of the Extraordinary State Commission of 1944 and the archives from the Einsatzgruppen Trial at Ludwigsburg, Germany.

After the research is complete, an 11-person team, usually led by Patrick Desbois, travels to Belarus and Ukraine to collect testimonial and forensic evidence of the murders. Each trip lasts 15–20 days. The team includes a photographer, ballistics expert, translators, drivers, daily report recorders, a witness interviewer and camera operator. During each trip, the team travels from village to village, where they interview and film the surviving eyewitnesses, using testimony of witnesses to discover the locations of the graves. Once the graves are located, the team uses high-tech equipment to obtain forensic evidence that validates the testimonies. When the team returns to Paris, the translated video testimony and the physical evidence is archived.

== Publications ==
In August 2008, Palgrave MacMillan published Holocaust By Bullets, written by Father Desbois about the work of YIU. Father Desbois titled the book after one of the methods the Nazis used to kill their victims. The Jewish Book Council awarded the book the 2008 National Jewish Book Award.

In June 2014, YIU published its ten-year anniversary book. Called Broad Daylight, the book encapsulates the horror of the Jewish genocide in which Germans in Eastern Europe massacred the Jews in broad daylight. The bilingual book (written in French and English) covers each territory that the organization has researched, splitting each into a chapter. These include, Ukraine, Belarus, Russia, Poland, Romania, Moldova and Lithuania.

In 2026, YIU partnered with Eastern European Holocaust Studies on the special issue Children and Childhood in the Holocaust in the Occupied Eastern Territories. The issue includes a methodological contribution on YIU’s research process and Oral History Archive, as well as several contributions drawing on testimonies and source materials from YIU’s collections.

== Future and current projects ==
Since 2009, the Archives and Research Center (CERRESE - Centre Européen de Ressources pour la Recherche et l'Enseignement sur la Shoah à l'Est), a unique research center in Paris, features unique archival resources and the new results from Father Desbois' field research, including video testimonies and artifacts.

The organization is also expanding InEvidence, an interactive map on its website, on which users can see the extent to which the Nazis attempted to wipe out the Jewish population in remote villages. The map covers all the countries in which the organization has expanded its research. It enables users to choose a specific country and location and to read information about the testimonies and/or watch a video regarding the town's mass murder.

The organization currently collects accounts of eyewitnesses of Russian war crimes. As of May 2023, this work had already identified 62 witnesses or victims of bombings, 45 witnesses of murders and other violences, 23 witnesses of acts of torture and hostage taking, 14 witnesses of pillaging and thefts, 10 witnesses or victims of expulsion and/or forced screening, and 2 witnesses of sexual violence.

== Sources ==
- Elaine Sciolino (6 October 2007). "A Priest Methodically Reveals Ukrainian Jews' Fate". The New York Times.
- Jordana Horn (23 January 2009). "Houses of Worship: How Father Desbois Became a Holocaust Memory Keeper". The Wall Street Journal.
- Jonathan Brown (26 May 2009). "A holy mission to reveal the truth about Nazi death squads". The Independent.
- Chojak, Michał; Fijalkow, Ygal (2026). "Contributions and Reflections on an Original Methodology: Collecting the Testimonies of Children, Eyewitnesses to Massacres During the Holocaust". Eastern European Holocaust Studies. 4 (1): 13–39. doi:10.1515/eehs-2025-0021.
