= Country Reports on Human Rights Practices =

Country Reports on Human Rights Practices are annual publications on the human rights conditions in countries and regions outside the United States, mandated by U.S. law to be submitted annually by the Bureau of Democracy, Human Rights, and Labor of the United States Department of State to the United States Congress. The reports cover internationally recognized individual, civil, political, and worker rights, as set forth in the Universal Declaration of Human Rights.

== History ==
The first report covered the year 1976, issued in 1977.

The second Trump administration removed several sections from the publication, including sections discussing systemic racial and ethnic discrimination, child abuse, child sexual exploitation, discrimination against women, LGBTQ+ people, disabled people, and indigenous people, free and fair election restrictions, government corruption, harassment of human rights organizations, non-refoulement, environmental issues, privacy violations, sexual violence against children, infanticide, gender-based violence, forced organ harvesting, freedom of movement, freedom of assembly and association, right to a fair trial, prison conditions, and female genital mutilation from the 2024 reports.

In November 2025, the U.S. Department of State announced that it would include DEI policies, mass migration, and government funding of abortion medications as "human rights infringements" in its future country human rights reports.

== Reactions ==
The People's Republic of China has responded to frequent criticism in this report by releasing a similar annual report titled the "Human Rights Record of the United States."

== See also ==
- United States Hague Abduction Convention Compliance Reports
