= List of combating antisemitism envoys =

Antisemitism envoys are official representatives appointed by governments or international organizations to address and combat antisemitism. Their responsibilities typically include developing and implementing policies, monitoring antisemitic incidents, promoting Holocaust education, advancing legislation, and fostering cooperation with Jewish organizations and other relevant bodies.

As of July 2024, at least 30 countries worldwide have appointed special envoys or coordinators dedicated to combating antisemitism. In 2019, the Forum of Special Envoys and Coordinators Combating Antisemitism (SECCA) was established under the auspices of the World Jewish Congress to serve as a platform for intergovernmental cooperation, information sharing, and coordination of initiatives.

== Australia ==
On 9 July 2024, the Australian government appointed lawyer, business executive, and President of the Executive Council of Australian Jewry, Jillian Segal as the nation's inaugural Special Envoy to Combat Antisemitism. Prime Minister Anthony Albanese described the appointment as a "step in easing the tensions that we see playing out [in Australia] as a result of the devastating conflict in the Middle East".

== Canada ==
In 2020, former attorney-general Irwin Cotler was appointed Canada's first special envoy for Holocaust remembrance and combatting antisemitism. He served until October 2023 and was replaced by diplomat Deborah Lyons. Lyons is to serve a two-year period.

== European Union ==
In October 2015, the European Commission created the new Antisemitism coordinator position in response to rising antisemitism in Europe. As a career EC bureaucrat, German civil servant Katharina von Schnurbein was appointed by then First Vice-president Frans Timmermans for the position in December 2015.

Her key responsibilities are to liaise with European Jewish communities and bodies and to propose and implement policies to address Antisemitism, promote Holocaust education, and foster Jewish life.

== Greece ==
As of September 2022, Ambassador Dimitris Yannakakis was Special Envoy of the Greek Ministry of Foreign Affairs for Combating Antisemitism and Promoting Holocaust Remembrance.

== Israel ==
In April 2022, Israeli Foreign Minister Yair Lapid appointed Noa Tishby to the unpaid post of envoy to combat antisemitism within the Israeli Ministry of Foreign Affairs. Members of the U.S. Congress and Jewish organizations welcomed the appointment. The envoy did not have a staff or budget. Tishby was removed from the position in April 2023 and replaced by human rights lawyer Michal Cotler-Wunsh. Wunsch advocates for the International Holocaust Remembrance Alliance's (IHRA) working definition of antisemitism.

== Romania ==
Historian Alexandru Muraru was appointed to the new position of the Romanian government's special representative for promoting the policies of memory, combating anti-Semitism, and xenophobia in January 2021. He served in this position until 2023.

== United Kingdom ==
Theresa May created the UK Government Adviser on Antisemitism in 2019. Former Labour MP John Mann was appointed for a five-year term expiring July 1, 2024. The role is unpaid, but the office receives £100,000 per year to cover travel and expenses. It also receives support from the Antisemitism Policy Trust.

During his tenure, Mann produced two reports, including "Anti-Jewish Hatred" and "Understanding Jewish Experience in Higher Education".

== United States ==
The Global Antisemitism Review Act of 2004 established the Office of the Special Envoy to Monitor and Combat Antisemitism, headed by the Special Envoy for Monitoring and Combating Antisemitism (SEAS), within the Department of State. The first Special Envoy was sworn in during 2006. The Special Envoy was elevated to the rank of ambassador in 2021.

== International organizations ==
=== Organization of American States ===
OAS Secretary General Luis Almagro announced the creation of the OAS Commissioner for Monitoring and Combating Anti-Semitism in 2021. In October 2021, Fernando Lottenberg was appointed the first commissioner.

== See also ==
- White House Jewish Liaison
- Antisemitism
- Antisemitism studies
