= Belarus 2020 Summer Olympics scandal =

2021 defection and political incident

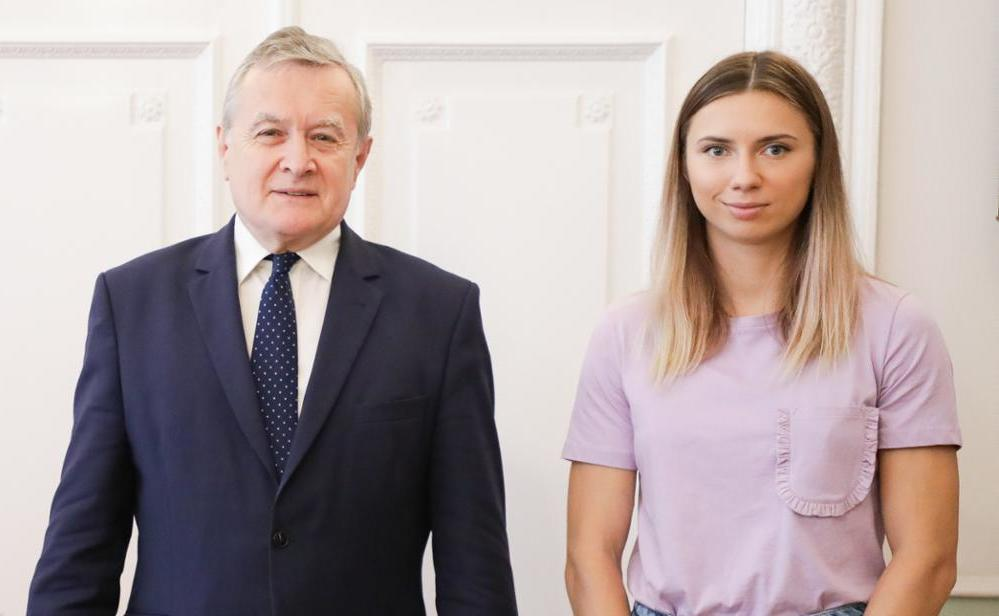
Tsimanouskaya with Deputy Prime Minister Piotr Gliński after arriving in Poland

On 1 August 2021, it was reported that Belarusian sprinter Krystsina Tsimanouskaya was in the process of being repatriated to Belarus from Tokyo, Japan, against her will, and had been removed from competing at the 2020 Summer Olympics, for posting a video on social media that was critical of her coaches.

Tsimanouskaya was put under the protection of Japanese police until she was offered a humanitarian visa by Poland; several days later she flew to Warsaw. The International Olympic Committee and other nations have been critical of the actions of Belarus, including placing additional sanctions against the country.

== Background ==
Belarusian President Alexander Lukashenko has a particular interest in sports, treating it as an ideological basis of his leadership, and athletes are more likely to be targets of Lukashenko, according to Amnesty International, because athletes are favoured by the state; as such, speaking out is considered more treacherous. A number of Belarusian athletes have been directly critical of Lukashenko, and some were banned and imprisoned for participating in protests.

On 7 December 2020, following allegations of athlete intimidation and even torture, the International Olympic Committee (IOC) announced several provisional measures against the National Olympic Committee for the Republic of Belarus (NOC RB). Among these measures was the banning of the NOC RB Executive Board "from all IOC events and activities, including the Olympic Games". The President of the Executive Board at the time was Alexander Lukashenko, while the First Vice-President of the board was his eldest son, Viktor Lukashenko. The measures were set to expire once the NOC RB Executive Board held its elections in late February 2021. These elections resulted in Viktor holding the dual role of President and First Vice-President of the board. Two weeks later, on 8 March, the IOC renewed their previous measures against the NOC BR Executive Board in addition to adding new measures.

Going into the 2020 Summer Olympics, three Belarusian athletes were disqualified for not undergoing the required number of drug tests in preparation for the Olympics.

=== Tsimanouskaya's video ===
On 30 July 2021, Tsimanouskaya recorded an Instagram video criticising officials from the NOC RB, saying that they had entered her in the 4 × 400 m relay race, a distance she had never contested, without asking her. She said the NOC RB had entered her because the athletes that were originally planned to compete were those who had been disqualified before the Games. Tsimanouskaya also blamed the testing issue on the NOC RB.

== Defection ==
According to a later account by Tsimanouskaya in an interview she gave to Reuters, she had told her coach that she was prepared to run in the 200 metres, but she was soon told by the head coach and the team representative that she would instead be withdrawn from the Olympic delegation and flown back to Belarus because of a decision that had been made "higher up". The Belarus National Olympic Committee separately announced that the decision to withdraw Tsimanouskaya had been made on doctors' advice about her psychological condition. Tsimanouskaya herself believed that the decision had been made in retaliation for her criticism. As Tsimanouskaya was being transported to the airport, she received a call from her grandmother who explained the domestic reaction to her video and warned her not to return, as the family feared that she might be taken to a psychiatric facility if she returned to Belarus. She then decided not to return. She drew the attention of police officers at the airport terminal, who took her into protective custody at an airport hotel overnight. She recorded a video where she stated "They are trying to get me out of the country without my permission", which was posted on the Telegram channel of the Belarusian Sport Solidarity Foundation (BSSF). She said that she had been "put under pressure" by team officials to return to Belarus and asked the International Olympic Committee for help. The BSSF itself also announced on its Telegram channel that there was an attempt to forcibly return Tsimanouskaya to Belarus and called for journalists and members of the Belarusian diaspora in Japan to meet Tsimanouskaya at the airport. Tsimanouskaya said to journalists that she was afraid of returning to Belarus, and she intended to claim asylum in Austria, where she often trains.

== International response ==
The incident received international attention, and several countries said that they were ready to offer Tsimanouskaya a visa and protection. On 2 August, she entered the Polish embassy in Tokyo, where she and her husband, fellow sprinter Arseniy Zdanevich, were granted humanitarian visas to the country. Zdanevich had fled to Ukraine after he heard the news, saying that he did not think twice about leaving Belarus, claiming however that he and Tsimanouskaya were completely apolitical: "We never had any connections, never supported the opposition. We're just normal sports people, we're just devoted to sports and we're not interested in the opposition movement."

The IOC confirmed that they were also safeguarding Tsimanouskaya and that the United Nations High Commissioner for Refugees was involved. The Japanese government also assured her safety. On 3 August, she was granted a humanitarian visa in Japan, and Japanese foreign minister Toshimitsu Motegi reported that she was in a "safe situation".

Though most of western Europe had offered her protection by 2 August, Tsimanouskaya reportedly chose to seek asylum in Poland as the country had expressly offered her the opportunity to continue competing; the IOC made contact with officials from the Polish Olympic Committee (PKOI) on 3 August regarding Tsimanouskaya resuming competition. On 4 August, Tsimanouskaya flew to Warsaw Chopin Airport, where she was met by Polish officials as well as Belarusian expatriates carrying carnations, a symbol of resistance, and the white-red-white flag of Belarus, which was officially flown from 1991 to 1995 and has been widely used during the 2020–2021 Belarusian protests.

== Reception in Belarus ==
Despite Zdanevich's assurance that Tsimanouskaya was apolitical, many Belarusian government supporters sent her threatening messages; the BSSF determined her life would be in danger if she returned to Belarus and encouraged her to travel to Poland. The state-owned Belarusian network Belarus-1 reported on 31 July that she was removed from the team for being unsportsmanlike, saying that she was "lazy", "foul-bred", and "unpatriotic", and did not deserve to represent Belarus; it also criticized the strictness of the IOC which prohibited the original relay runners from competing.

The NOC RB, which withdrew Tsimanouskaya from competition following the Instagram video, said on 1 August that it was concerned by the athlete's "emotional and psychological state ... according to doctors". Tsimanouskaya said she did not see any doctors.

=== Other athletes ===
Several fellow Belarusian athletes have spoken in support of Tsimanouskaya, while others have condemned her. Some contacted by The Guardian declined to talk, also wanting to steer clear of politics. On 4 August, Belarusian athletes Yana Maksimava and Andrei Krauchanka also announced they would not return to the country but would seek refuge in Germany, where they train. Krauchanka has previously been detained in Belarus for taking part in protests.

== IOC investigation ==
On 3 August, the IOC launched an investigation of the incident, demanding a report from the NOC RB by the end of the day explaining why they attempted to repatriate Tsimanouskaya. A disciplinary commission, during which Tsimanouskaya was set to testify, was planned for 6 August. On this day, as part of the investigation, the IOC revoked the accreditation of two Belarusian delegates, head athletics coach Yuri Moisevich and team official Artur Shimak, who were asked to leave the Olympic Village. The IOC added that they will have an opportunity "to be heard". President of the IOC Thomas Bach and the Japanese foreign ministry both gave statements on 6 August describing what happened to Tsimanouskaya as "deplorable" and "unjust".

== Sanctions ==
The United States, Canada, and United Kingdom implemented coordinated financial sanctions against Belarus on 9 August. Lukashenko was critical towards the UK and Canada, calling the nations "America's lapdogs", telling them to choke on their sanctions, and saying he would rather have talks with the West than engage in a sanctions war. On the same day, the European Union (EU) said it may leverage more sanctions, as Belarus had continued to defy international recommendations, on the same day, citing the case of Tsimanouskaya among other incidents since 9 August 2020.

On 3 February 2022, the United States imposed visa restrictions on Belarusian nationals involved in extraterritorial counter-dissident activity, including the Olympics scandal, under the Khashoggi Ban.

=== Belarusian response to sanctions ===
Following its granting of visas to Tsimanouskaya and her husband, Poland said that Belarus, which the EU has previously accused of state-sponsored facilitation of human trafficking and migrant smuggling, started sending migrants it had flown in from the Middle East into Poland as a political weapon. On 5 August, the EU summoned Belarusian officials to Brussels to explain, with the European Commission warning Lukashenko to stop using migrants as tools.

On 9 August, the one-year anniversary of his controversial re-election, Lukashenko held a lengthy conference in Minsk, saying that he believed Tsimanouskaya would not have made the allegations herself and asserting she had been manipulated by people in Poland.
