= Tom Malinowski =

American diplomat and politician (born 1965)

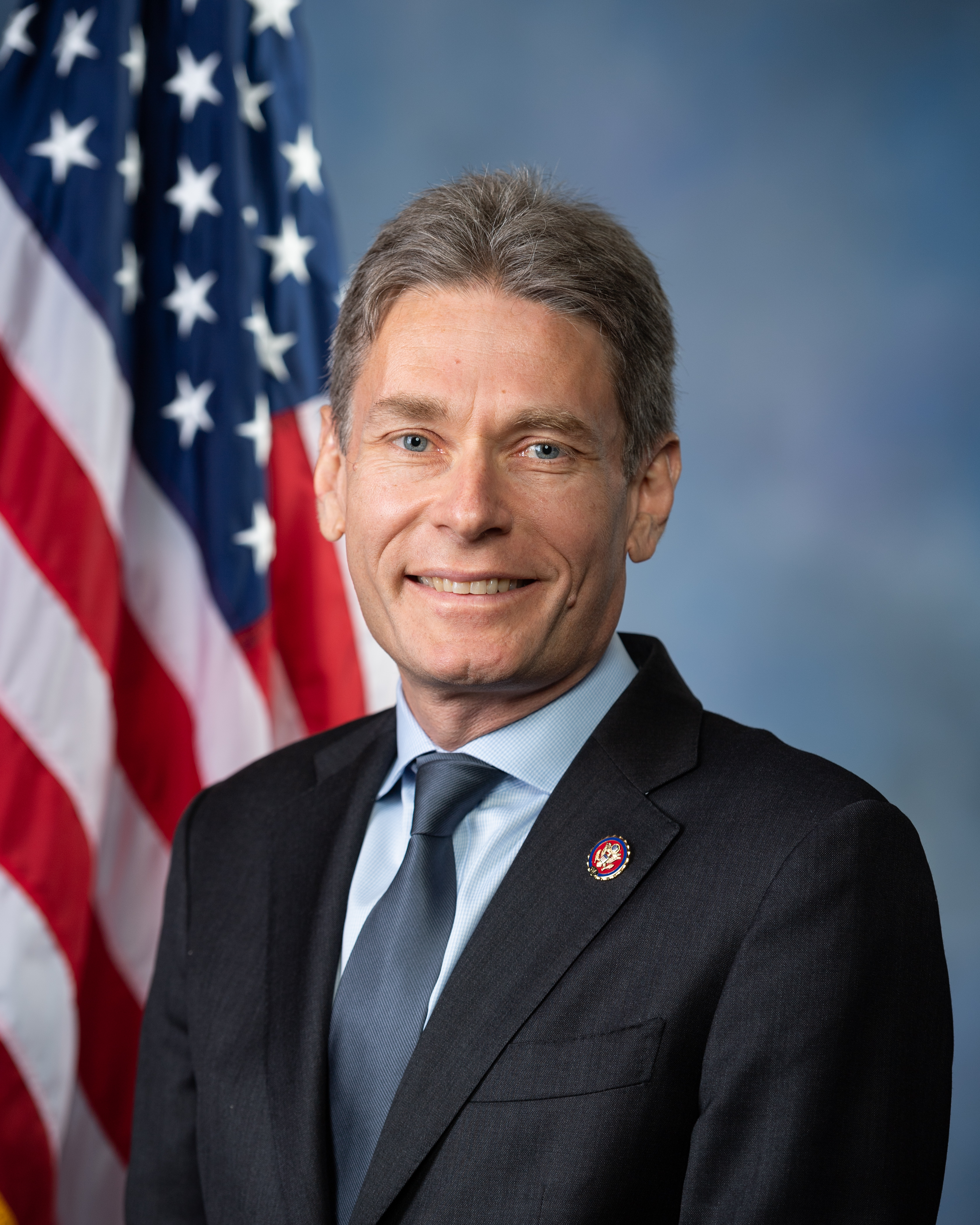
- Official portrait, 2019

Member of the U.S. House of Representatives from New Jersey's 7th district
- In office January 3, 2019 – January 3, 2023
- Preceded by: Leonard Lance
- Succeeded by: Thomas Kean Jr.

12th Assistant Secretary of State for Democracy, Human Rights, and Labor
- In office April 3, 2014 – January 20, 2017
- President: Barack Obama
- Deputy: Virginia L. Bennett
- Preceded by: Michael Posner
- Succeeded by: Robert Destro

Personal details
- Born: Tomasz Pobóg Malinowski; September 23, 1965 (age 61) Słupsk, Poland
- Party: Democratic
- Spouse: Henrietta Levin (m. 2022)
- Children: 1
- Relatives: Blair Clark (stepfather)
- Education: University of California, Berkeley (BA); St Antony's College, Oxford (MPhil)
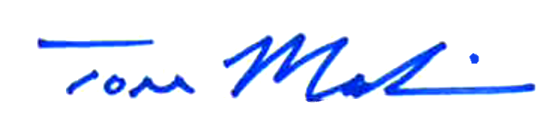
- Signature

Tomasz Pobóg Malinowski (/ˌmælɪˈnaʊski/ MAL-in-OW-skee, Polish: [ˈtɔmaʂ ˈpɔbuk maliˈnɔfskʲi]; born September 23, 1965) is an American politician and former diplomat who served from 2019 to 2023 as the U.S. representative from New Jersey's 7th congressional district. A Democrat, he served as Assistant Secretary of State for Democracy, Human Rights, and Labor in the Obama administration.

A vocal opponent of Donald Trump, Malinowski was first elected in 2018, defeating Republican incumbent Leonard Lance by five points. He was reelected in 2020 by a narrow margin over State Senate Minority Leader Thomas Kean Jr. In a 2022 rematch with redrawn congressional maps favoring Republicans in the district, Kean beat Malinowski by nearly two points.

On April 26, 2024, Malinowski announced that he would run for chair of the Hunterdon County Democratic Party. On June 23, 2024, Malinowski won the election. He resigned as chair on November 6, 2025.

In November 2025, Malinowski announced his campaign for the 2026 special election in New Jersey's 11th congressional district to succeed Mikie Sherrill, who resigned after being elected governor. He narrowly lost the Democratic primary to Analilia Mejia in an upset.

== Early life and education ==
Malinowski was born in Słupsk, Poland, and lived in Brwinów until leaving the country at the age of six with his mother, Joanna, who married journalist and political operative Blair Clark. He grew up in Princeton, New Jersey, and graduated in 1983 from Princeton High School, where he wrote for the school newspaper The Tower and interned in Senator Bill Bradley's office. In 1987, Malinowski received a bachelor of arts in political science from the University of California, Berkeley, where he won a Harry S. Truman Scholarship in 1985. In 1991, he received a master of philosophy from St. Antony's College, Oxford, where he was a Rhodes Scholar.

== Career ==
=== Early career ===
Malinowski worked as a special assistant to U.S. Senator Daniel Patrick Moynihan in 1988. He worked for the Institute for Human Sciences in Vienna, Austria, and in 1993 as a research assistant for the Ford Foundation. From 1994 to 1998, Malinowski was a speechwriter for U.S. Secretaries of State Warren Christopher and Madeleine Albright as well as a member of the Policy Planning Staff at the Department of State. From 1998 to 2001, he served as senior director on the National Security Council at the White House.

=== Human Rights Watch ===
From 2001 to 2013, Malinowski was the Washington director for Human Rights Watch (HRW). In that position, he advocated for the end of torture techniques and black sites the U.S. government used during the war on terror. He campaigned for democratic reforms in Myanmar and financial sanctions on its leadership. Malinowski argued for the recognition of women's rights as a precondition to any peace talks with the Taliban. He also pushed for a no-fly zone in Syria during the ongoing civil war.

=== Assistant Secretary of State ===
Some saw Malinowski as a likely nominee for Assistant Secretary of State for Democracy, Human Rights, and Labor, but his previous registration as a lobbyist at HRW necessitated a waiver from the president. On July 8, 2013, during Obama's second term, Malinowski was nominated to serve as Assistant Secretary of State for Democracy, Human Rights, and Labor. He testified before the Senate Foreign Relations Committee on September 24, 2013, and was confirmed by the U.S. Senate on April 2, 2014. According to columnist Jennifer Rubin, leaders from both parties praised Malinowski in 2014 for his defense of human rights and his work toward ending torture.

In 2016, Malinowski said the State Department planned to release a list of North Korean human rights abusers. He backed the United Nations' efforts to investigate possible war crimes committed during the Sri Lankan Civil War. He assisted with sanctioning Russian officials under the Magnitsky Act for human rights abuses.

In July 2014, Bahrain's government expelled Malinowski after he met with members of a Bahraini opposition group during a scheduled visit. Bahrain's foreign ministry asserted that his meeting was an improper intervention in the country's affairs but said the incident would not affect Bahrain–U.S. relations. The U.S. State Department released a statement of concern about the actions while Secretary of State John Kerry called Bahrain's actions unacceptable and contrary to diplomatic protocol. Malinowski returned to Bahrain in December 2014 with the assistant secretary of state for Near Eastern affairs.

After his tenure at the State Department, Malinowski joined fellow former Obama officials to lobby Congress to prevent the Trump administration from lifting the sanctions on Russia after it annexed Crimea. He criticized Donald Trump for having an "obscene fondness" for the world's tyrants and instituting a "complete departure from decades of American tradition".

=== U.S. House of Representatives ===
==== Elections ====
===== 2018 =====
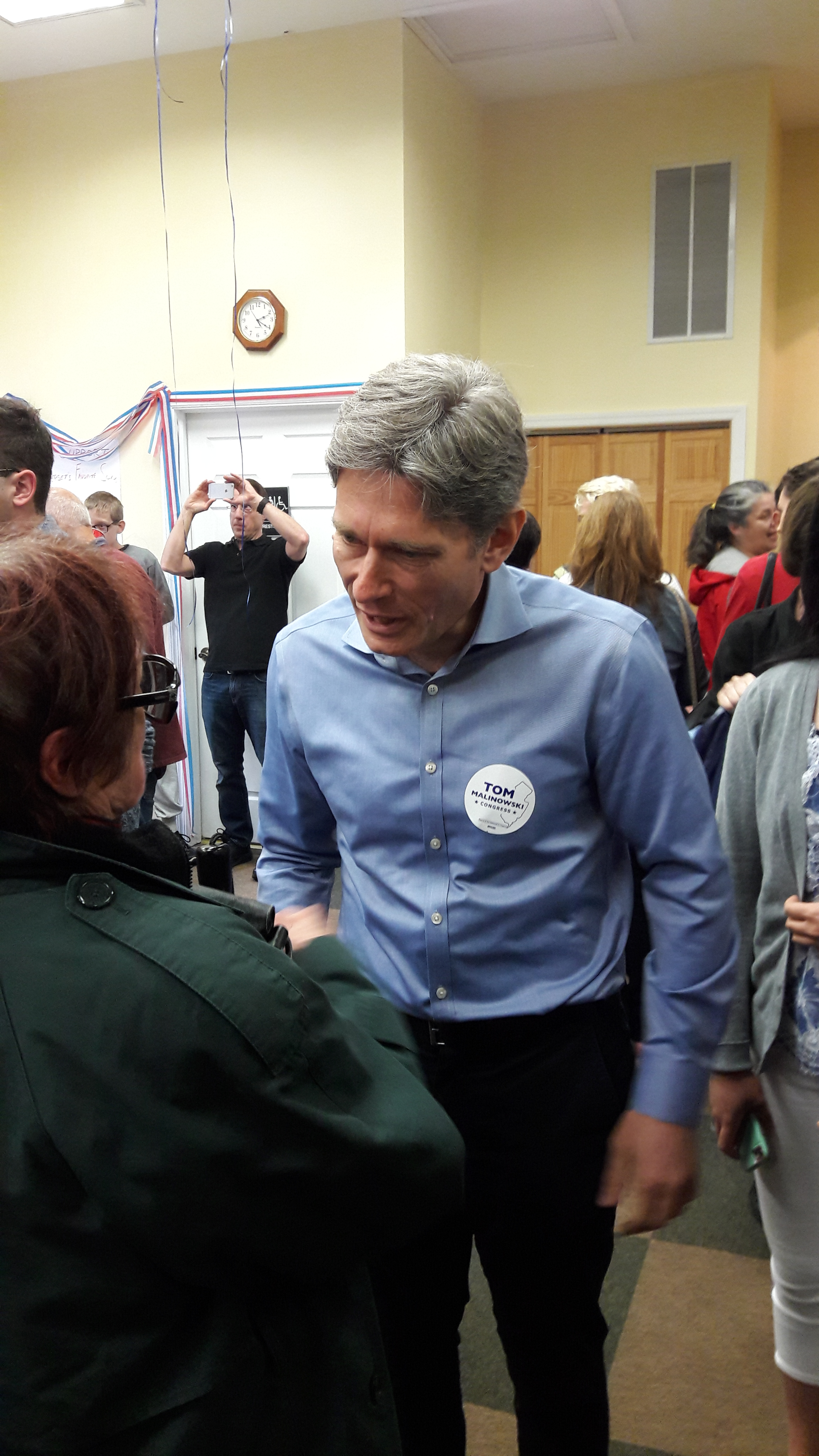
Malinowski at his campaign headquarters in Martinsville, New Jersey

On October 2, 2017, Malinowski announced his candidacy for New Jersey's 7th congressional district in the 2018 midterm elections. He decided to run for Congress after the 2016 election of Donald Trump, which he saw as an indication that America was in "deep trouble". Malinowski cited health care, immigration, diplomacy, environmental policy, and infrastructure as areas of focus.

Malinowski supports the Affordable Care Act and criticized the Republican Party's attempts to dismantle it. He supports a public health insurance option, but opposes Medicare for all. He supports raising the minimum wage to $15 per hour as well as stronger collective bargaining rights and protections for workers.

In the June 5 Democratic primary election, Malinowski defeated social worker Peter Jacob and lawyer Goutam Jois with 66.8% of the vote, winning all counties in the district.

Malinowski won the November 6 general election with 51.7% of the vote. He and Lance each carried three of the district's six counties; Malinowski won Essex, Somerset, and Union, while Lance carried Morris, Warren, and his native Hunterdon. But Malinowski won the district's shares of Somerset and Union counties, the two most populous counties in the district, by 22,300 votes, which exceeded the overall margin of 16,200 votes.

===== 2020 =====
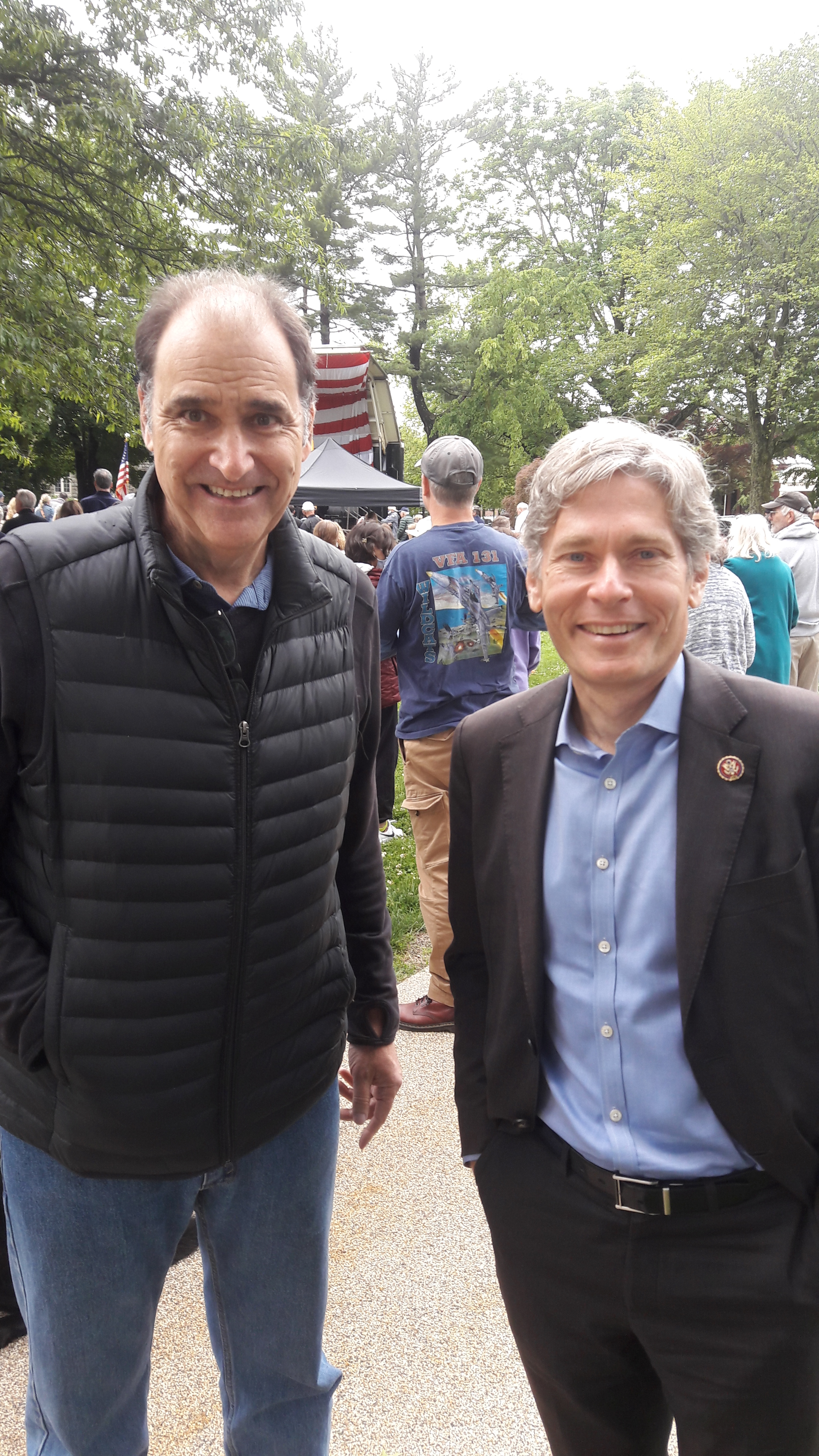
Former Summit mayor Jordan Glatt and Malinowski at the Memorial Day remembrance in Summit, New Jersey, in May 2021

During his reelection campaign, Malinowski faced death threats after introducing a bill condemning the conspiratorial group QAnon. The National Republican Congressional Committee then aired ads falsely accusing him of lobbying to protect sexual predators when he worked for Human Rights Watch.

Malinowski was reelected, defeating New Jersey Senate Republican leader Tom Kean Jr. by 1.2%. Due to the very close margin, the election remained unresolved for weeks. In terms of both absolute numbers and vote percentage, Malinowski's race was the closest House race in the country won by a Democrat.

===== 2022 =====
In a 2022 rematch with redrawn congressional maps favoring Republicans in the district, Kean defeated Malinowski by nearly two points. On May 23, 2023, Malinowski announced that he would not run against Kean in 2024.

==== Tenure ====
When he took office in January 2019, Malinowski became the first Democrat since 1956 to represent New Jersey's 7th district.

In May 2019, Malinowski was the first member of the New Jersey House delegation to call to begin the impeachment inquiry against Trump. He endorsed Democratic presidential nominee Joe Biden in January 2020.

During his first term, Malinowski advocated for efforts to prohibit weapons sales to Saudi Arabia for use in the Yemen conflict. He also advocated for accountability related to Saudi Arabia's role in the murder of Jamal Khashoggi. His work contributed to the release of the Khashoggi Report and the subsequent Khashoggi ban.

American video game company Activision Blizzard punished a Hong Kong-based professional gamer for supporting pro-democracy Hong Kong protests. Malinowski accused Blizzard and Apple of censorship. He co-signed a letter to Activision Blizzard CEO Bobby Kotick that read, "As China amplifies its campaign of intimidation, you and your company must decide whether to look beyond the bottom line and promote American values—like freedom of speech and thought—or to give in to Beijing's demands in order to preserve market access."

The America COMPETES Act legislation, passed by the House in February 2022, included provisions Malinowski wrote. He was later appointed to the conference committee that finalized the bill.

===== Controversy =====
In April 2021, the Associated Press reported that Malinowski had traded approximately $1 million of stock in medical and tech companies involved in the COVID-19 pandemic response. Malinowski failed to disclose the trades within the period of time required by federal law; he said the failure to disclose the trades was an error. Two complaints against him were filed with the Office of Congressional Ethics, which announced in October 2021 that it found "substantial reason to believe" that Malinowski had violated federal laws designed to defend against conflicts of interest. The office formally referred the investigation to the House Committee on Ethics, which continued its own investigation. The House Ethics Committee's investigation into Malinowski's stock trading proceeded, and ended in August 2022, after the death of Jackie Walorski, ranking Republican on the House Ethics Committee. Walorski could not be replaced on the Ethics Committee before the November 2022 election, which Malinowski lost, ending the investigation.

==== Voting record ====
As of June 2022, Malinowski had voted in line with Joe Biden's stated position 98.2% of the time.

==== Committee assignments ====
- Committee on Foreign Affairs (vice chair)
  - Subcommittee on the Middle East, North Africa, and International Terrorism
  - Subcommittee on Oversight and Investigations
- Committee on Transportation and Infrastructure
  - Subcommittee on Highways and Transit
  - Subcommittee on Railroads, Pipelines, and Hazardous Materials
  - Subcommittee on Water Resources and Environment
- Committee on Homeland Security
  - Subcommittee on Intelligence and Counterterrorism

==== Caucus memberships ====
- Caucus Against Foreign Corruption and Kleptocracy (co-chair)
- Egypt Human Rights Caucus (co-chair)
- COVID-19 Global Vaccination Caucus (co-chair)
- Protection of Civilians in Conflict Caucus (co-chair)
- SALT Caucus (founding member)
- New Democrat Coalition
- End Corruption Caucus
- Problem Solvers Caucus (second term only)
- House Pro-Choice Caucus

== Post-congressional career ==
On March 28, 2023, Malinowski joined the McCain Institute. On April 13, 2023, he joined the board of directors of Radio Free Europe/Radio Liberty.

On April 26, 2024, Malinowski announced his candidacy for Hunterdon County Democratic Party chair. He won the election on June 23, 2024.

Malinowski spent the fall 2025 semester as a visiting scholar and professor at Seton Hall University's school of diplomacy.

== Personal life ==
In September 2017, Malinowski moved to Rocky Hill, New Jersey, close to where he grew up. In 2020, he moved to the Ringoes section of East Amwell Township, New Jersey.

Malinowski's stepfather Blair Clark was a journalist, a broadcast executive, and a political operator. Clark's sister was Anne Martindell, a member of the New Jersey State Senate and a United States ambassador to New Zealand.

Malinowski has faced charges related to driving on a suspended license.

Malinowski was previously married to a Burmese refugee whom he met studying at Oxford. The couple has one daughter, Emily. In 2022 he married Henrietta Levin.

== Electoral history ==
New Jersey's 7th congressional district: Results 2018–2020
Year	Democratic	Votes	Pct	Republican	Votes	Pct	3rd Party	Party	Votes	Pct	3rd Party	Party	Votes	Pct
2018	Tom Malinowski	166,985	51.7%	Leonard Lance (incumbent)	150,785	46.7%	Diane Moxley	Green	2,676	0.8%	Gregg Mele	Independent	2,296	0.7%
2020	Tom Malinowski	219,629	50.6%	Thomas Kean Jr.	214,318	49.4%								
2022	Tom Malinowski	150,701	48.6%	Thomas Kean Jr.	159,392	51.4%								

Government offices
Preceded by Uzra Zeya; Acting	Assistant Secretary of State for Democracy, Human Rights, and Labor; 2014–2017	Succeeded by Virginia L. Bennett; Acting
U.S. House of Representatives
Preceded by Leonard Lance	Member of the U.S. House of Representatives from New Jersey's 7th congressional district 2019–2023	Succeeded by Thomas Kean Jr.
U.S. order of precedence (ceremonial)
Preceded by Tom MacArthur as Former U.S. Representative	Order of precedence of the United States as Former U.S. Representative	Succeeded by Andrew Young as Former U.S. Representative
