= Virginia L. Bennett =

American diplomat

Virginia Bennett
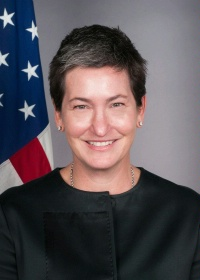

Assistant Secretary of State for Democracy, Human Rights, and Labor Acting
- In office January 20, 2017 – November 30, 2017
- President: Donald Trump
- Preceded by: Tom Malinowski
- Succeeded by: Robert Destro

Personal details
- Education: Wellesley College (BA); Cornell University (MBA)
- Occupation: Foreign Service Officer

Virginia Lynn Bennett is a retired American diplomat and career Senior Foreign Service Officer who formerly served as the Acting Assistant Secretary of State for Democracy, Human Rights, and Labor. In addition, she served as the Principal Deputy Assistant Secretary of State for Democracy, Human Rights, and Labor.

== Education ==
Bennett attended Wellesley College and earned a Master of Business Administration from Cornell University.

== Career ==
Bennett was a career Senior Foreign Service Officer, and served in her early career at the US embassies in Bogotá, Colombia, Tokyo, Japan, and Manila, Philippines. She also worked in New York City at the United States Mission to the United Nations, in Washington, DC, in the United States Department of State Operations Center, and in the Bureau of Near Eastern Affairs. She served as Executive Assistant and Chief of Staff to Deputy Secretary of State John Negroponte from 2007 to 2009. From 2009 to 2011, she was Deputy Executive Secretary of the State Department under Secretary Hillary Clinton. From 2011 to 2014, she served as the Deputy Chief of Mission at the US Embassy in Athens, Greece.

On July 14, 2014, Bennett was appointed Principal Deputy Assistant Secretary of State for Democracy, Human Rights, and Labor. On January 20, 2017, she became acting Assistant Secretary of State for Democracy, Human Rights, and Labor, following the departure of Tom Malinowski from the position. She retired from the Foreign Service as a two-star equivalent on November 30, 2017.

== Personal life ==
Bennett speaks French, Japanese, and Spanish.
