= 2022 United States House of Representatives elections in New Jersey =

- November 8, 2022

All 12 New Jersey seats to the United States House of Representatives
- Turnout: 41% (▼31pp)
	Majority party	Minority party
Party	Democratic	Republican
Last election	10	2
Seats won	9	3
Seat change	▼1	▲1
Popular vote	1,416,422	1,160,260
Percentage	54.27%	44.46%
Swing	▼3.01%	▲2.88%

Democratic hold
Republican hold Republican gain
Democratic
50–60%
60–70%
70–80%
Republican
50–60%
60–70%

The 2022 United States House of Representatives elections in New Jersey were held on November 8, 2022, to elect the 12 U.S. representatives from the state of New Jersey, one from each of the state's 12 congressional districts.

Republicans flipped one seat in the 7th district and reduced the Democratic majority in the delegation to 9–3.

== Overview ==
District	Democratic		Republican		Others		Total		Result
District	Votes	%	Votes	%	Votes	%	Votes	%	Result
District 1	139,559	62.34%	78,794	35.19%	5,531	2.47%	223,884	100.0%	Democratic hold
District 2	94,522	39.97%	139,217	58.87%	2,745	1.16%	236,484	100.0%	Republican hold
District 3	150,498	55.46%	118,415	43.64%	2,463	0.91%	271,376	100.0%	Democratic hold
District 4	81,233	31.37%	173,288	66.92%	4,441	1.71%	258,962	100.0%	Republican hold
District 5	145,559	54.73%	117,873	44.32%	2,511	0.94%	265,943	100.0%	Democratic hold
District 6	106,238	57.45%	75,839	41.01%	2,842	1.54%	184,919	100.0%	Democratic hold
District 7	150,701	48.60%	159,392	51.40%	0	0.00%	310,093	100.0%	Republican gain
District 8	78,382	73.62%	24,957	23.44%	3,134	2.94%	106,473	100.0%	Democratic hold
District 9	82,457	54.98%	65,365	43.58%	2,162	1.44%	149,984	100.0%	Democratic hold
District 10	100,710	77.64%	25,993	20.04%	3,004	2.32%	129,707	100.0%	Democratic hold
District 11	161,436	58.99%	109,952	40.18%	2,276	0.83%	273,664	100.0%	Democratic hold
District 12	125,127	63.12%	71,175	35.91%	1,925	0.97%	198,227	100.0%	Democratic hold
Total	1,416,422	54.27%	1,160,260	44.46%	33,034	1.27%	2,609,716	100.0%	

Popular vote
Democratic	54.27%
Republican	44.46%
Other	1.27%

House seats
Democratic	75%
Republican	25%

== District 1 ==
2022 New Jersey's 1st congressional district election
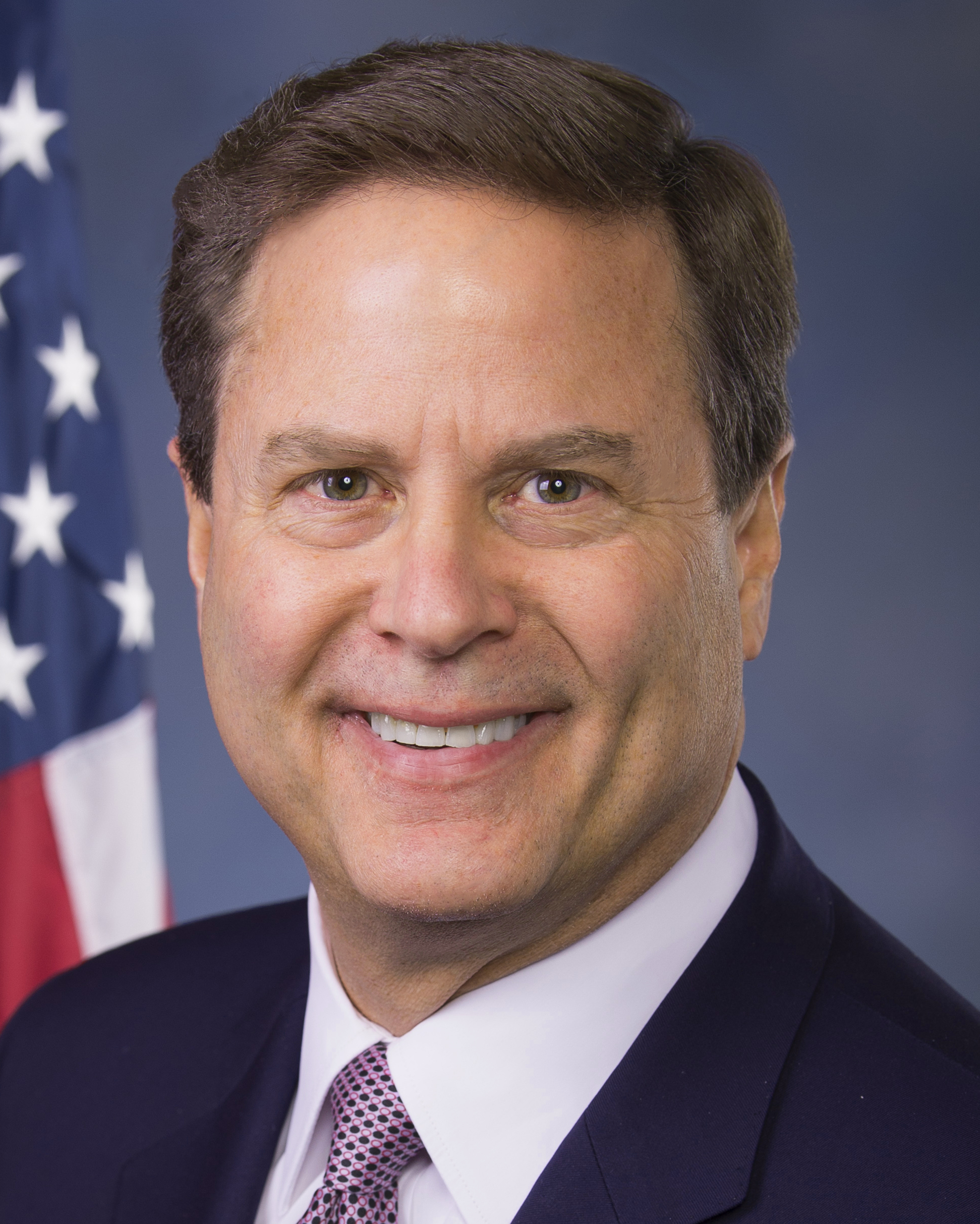

Nominee	Donald Norcross	Claire Gustafson
Party	Democratic	Republican
Popular vote	139,559	78,794
Percentage	62.3%	35.2%
- Norcross: 40–50% 50–60% 60–70% 70–80% 80–90% 90–100% Gustafson: 50–60% 70–80%
U.S. Representative before election
Donald Norcross
Democratic
Elected U.S. Representative
Donald Norcross
Democratic

Democrat Donald Norcross, who had represented the district since 2014, was re-elected with 62.5% of the vote in 2020.

=== Democratic primary ===
==== Candidates ====
===== Nominee =====
- Donald Norcross, incumbent U.S. Representative

===== Eliminated in primary =====
- Mario DeSantis, public school teacher

==== Endorsements ====
Donald Norcross

Labor unions

- Communications Workers of America
- New Jersey Education Association

Organizations

- Garden State Equality
- Sierra Club

==== Results ====
Democratic primary results
Party	Candidate	Votes	%
Democratic	Donald Norcross (incumbent)	44,985	76.7
Democratic	Mario DeSantis	13,696	23.3
Total votes		58,681	100.0

=== Republican primary ===
==== Candidates ====
===== Nominee =====
- Claire Gustafson, businesswoman, former Collingswood school board member, and nominee for New Jersey's 1st congressional district in 2020

===== Eliminated in primary =====
- Damon Galdo, union carpenter

===== Withdrawn =====
- Nicholas Magner, gun rights activist

==== Endorsements ====
Claire Gustafson

State legislators

- Edward Durr, New Jersey State Senator from the 3rd district (2022-present)

==== Results ====
Republican primary results
Party	Candidate	Votes	%
Republican	Claire Gustafson	13,411	69.0
Republican	Damon Galdo	6,034	31.0
Total votes		19,445	100.0

=== General election ===
==== Predictions ====
Source	Ranking	As of
The Cook Political Report	Solid D	June 15, 2022
Inside Elections	Solid D	January 10, 2022
Sabato's Crystal Ball	Safe D	January 4, 2022
Politico	Solid D	April 5, 2022
RCP	Likely D	August 17, 2022
Fox News	Solid D	July 11, 2022
DDHQ	Solid D	July 20, 2022
538	Solid D	June 30, 2022
The Economist	Safe D	September 28, 2022

==== Polling ====
Poll source	Date(s) administered	Sample size (Note: Key: A – all adults RV – registered voters LV – likely voters V – unclear)	Margin of error	Donald Norcross (D)	Claire Gustafson (R)	Undecided
Grassroots Targeting (R) (Note: Poll sponsored by Gustafson's campaign)	July 13–19, 2022	625 (LV)	± 4.0%	49%	44%	8%

==== Results ====
2022 New Jersey's 1st congressional district election
Party	Candidate	Votes	%
Democratic	Donald Norcross (incumbent)	139,559	62.3
Republican	Claire Gustafson	78,794	35.2
Independent	Patricia Kline	3,343	1.5
Libertarian	Isaiah Fletcher	1,546	0.7
Independent	Allen Cannon	642	0.3
Total votes		223,884	100.0
Democratic hold			

==== By county ====
County	Donald Norcross Democratic		Claire Gustafson Republican		Various candidates Other parties		Margin		Total votes cast
County	#	%	#	%	#	%	#	%	Total votes cast
Burlington (part)	4,406	60.6%	2,725	37.5%	144	2.0%	1,681	23.1%	7,276
Camden	97,135	66.9%	44,394	30.6%	3,684	2.5%	52,741	36.3%	145,213
Gloucester (part)	38,018	53.3%	31,675	44.4%	1,702	2.4%	6,343	9.9%	71,395
Totals	136,199	62.2%	77,458	35.4%	5,388	2.5%	58,741	26.8%	219,045

== District 2 ==
2022 New Jersey's 2nd congressional district election
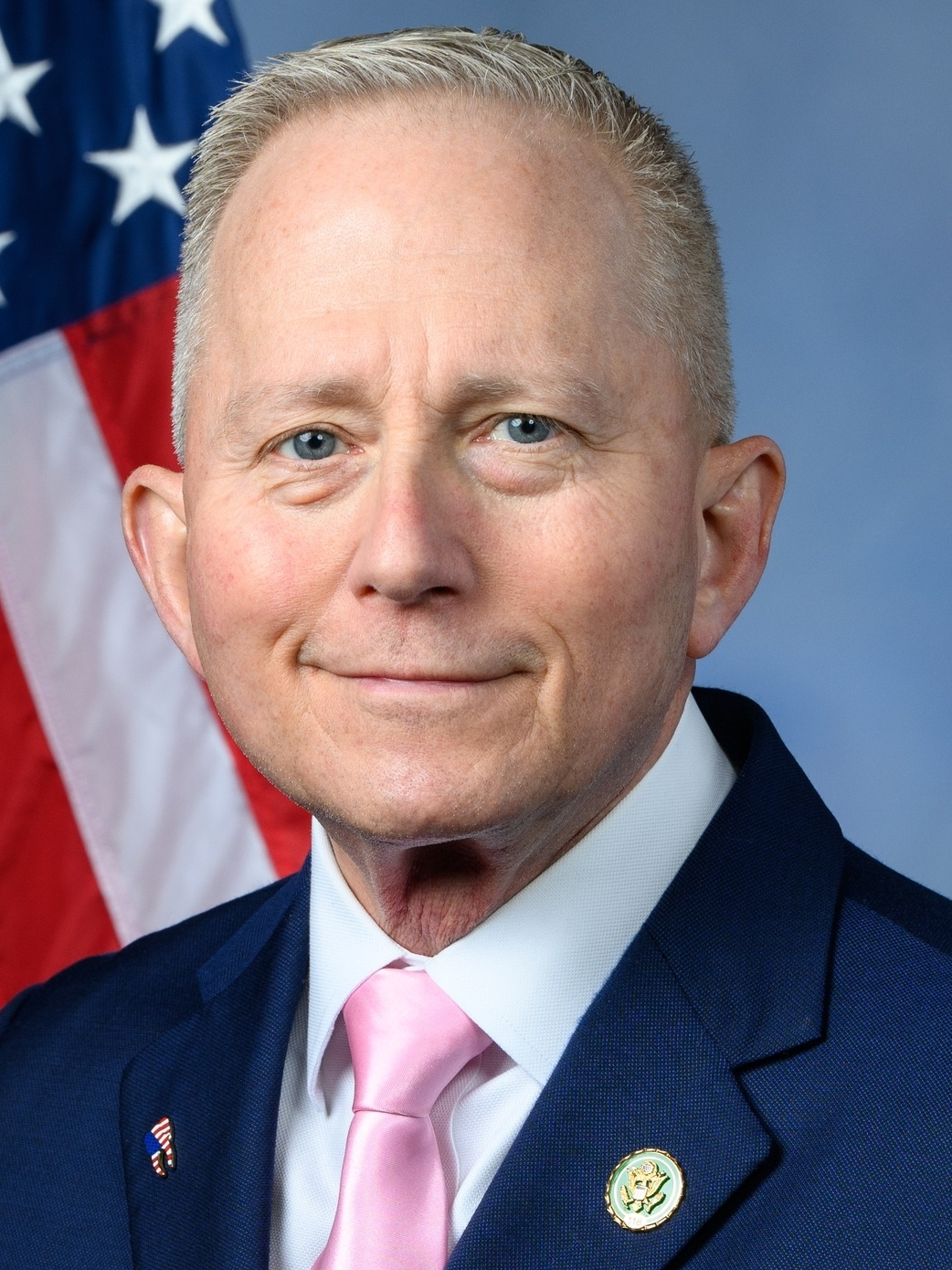

Nominee	Jeff Van Drew	Tim Alexander
Party	Republican	Democratic
Popular vote	139,217	94,522
Percentage	58.9%	40.0%
- Van Drew: 40–50% 50–60% 60–70% 70–80% 80–90% Alexander: 50–60% 60–70% 70–80%
U.S. Representative before election
Jeff Van Drew
Republican
Elected U.S. Representative
Jeff Van Drew
Republican

Republican Jeff Van Drew, who had represented the district since 2019, was re-elected with 51.9% of the vote in 2020.

=== Republican primary ===
==== Candidates ====
===== Nominee =====
- Jeff Van Drew, incumbent U.S. Representative

===== Eliminated in primary =====
- John Barker, U.S. Army veteran (previously filed to run in New Jersey's 3rd congressional district)
- Sean Pignatelli

===== Withdrawn =====
- Scott Hitchner Jr., U.S. Air Force ceteran (withdrew to run for Salem County Commissioner)

==== Endorsements ====
Jeff Van Drew

Federal officials

- Donald Trump, 45th president of the United States

Organizations

- United States Chamber of Commerce

==== Results ====
Republican primary results
Party	Candidate	Votes	%
Republican	Jeff Van Drew (incumbent)	35,843	86.0
Republican	John Barker	3,217	7.7
Republican	Sean Pignatelli	2,601	6.2
Total votes		41,661	100.0

=== Democratic primary ===
==== Candidates ====
===== Nominee =====
- Tim Alexander, former County Detective and civil rights attorney

===== Eliminated in primary =====
- Carolyn Rush, engineer

===== Withdrawn =====
- Curtis Green, reverend
- Hector Tavarez, retired Egg Harbor Township police captain and school board member (endorsed Alexander)

===== Declined =====
- Amy Kennedy, mental health advocate, wife of former U.S. Representative Patrick J. Kennedy, and nominee for this seat in 2020 (endorsed Alexander)

==== Endorsements ====
Tim Alexander

U.S. Representatives

- Eric Swalwell, U.S. Representative from CA-15 (2013–present)

State legislators

- Vince Mazzeo, former New Jersey General Assemblymember from the 2nd district (2014-2022), former chair of the New Jersey General Assembly State and Local Government Committee (2018-2022), former mayor of Northfield (2008-2014)
- Shavonda Sumter, New Jersey General Assemblymember from the 35th district (2012-present)

Individuals

- William Cunningham, chief investigator on the House Oversight Committee and candidate for New Jersey's 2nd congressional district in 2018 and 2020
- Amy Kennedy, mental health advocate, wife of former U.S. Representative Patrick J. Kennedy, and nominee for this seat in 2020
- Hector Tavarez, retired Egg Harbor Township police captain, school board member, and former candidate for New Jersey's 2nd congressional district

Organizations

- The Collective PAC
- Garden State Equality

County Democratic Party organizations

- Atlantic County

==== Results ====
Democratic primary results
Party	Candidate	Votes	%
Democratic	Tim Alexander	17,199	61.7
Democratic	Carolyn Rush	10,667	38.3
Total votes		27,866	100.0

=== General election ===
Debate
No.	Date	Host	Moderator	Link	Republican	Democratic
Key: P Participant A Absent N Not invited I Invited W Withdrawn						
Key: P Participant A Absent N Not invited I Invited W Withdrawn					Jeff Van Drew	Tim Alexander
1	Oct. 19, 2022	Stockton University William J. Hughes; Center for Public Policy; The Press of Atlantic City	John Froonjian		P	P

==== Predictions ====
Source	Ranking	As of
The Cook Political Report	Solid R	June 15, 2022
Inside Elections	Solid R	January 10, 2022
Sabato's Crystal Ball	Safe R	January 4, 2022
Politico	Likely R	April 5, 2022
RCP	Safe R	June 9, 2022
Fox News	Solid R	July 11, 2022
DDHQ	Solid R	July 20, 2022
538	Solid R	June 30, 2022
The Economist	Safe R	September 28, 2022

==== Polling ====
Hypothetical polling

Jeff Van Drew vs. generic Democrat

Poll source	Date(s) administered	Sample size	Margin of error	Jeff Van Drew (R)	Generic Democrat	Undecided
Change Research (D) (Note: Poll sponsored by Alexander's campaign)	April 12–15, 2021	641 (RV)	± 4.0%	48%	42%	10%

==== Results ====
2022 New Jersey's 2nd congressional district election
Party	Candidate	Votes	%
Republican	Jeff Van Drew (incumbent)	139,217	58.9
Democratic	Tim Alexander	94,522	40.0
Libertarian	Michael Gallo	1,825	0.8
Independent	Anthony Parisi Sanchez	920	0.4
Total votes		236,484	100.0
Republican hold			

==== By county ====
County	Jeff Van Drew Republican		Tim Alexander Democratic		Various candidates Other parties		Margin		Total votes cast
County	#	%	#	%	#	%	#	%	Total votes cast
Atlantic	42,208	55.1%	33,585	43.8%	810	1.1%	8,623	11.3%	76,603
Cape May	24,113	63.8%	13,210	35.0%	456	1.3%	10,903	28.8%	37,779
Cumberland	17,314	55.6%	13,352	42.9%	469	1.5%	3,962	12.7%	31,135
Gloucester (part)	15,803	54.0%	13,048	44.6%	436	1.4%	2,755	9.6%	29,287
Ocean (part)	28,336	65.8%	14,439	33.5%	294	0.7%	13,897	32.3%	43,069
Salem	11,443	61.5%	6,888	37.0%	280	1.5%	4,555	24.5%	18,611
Totals	135,843	59.3%	90,753	39.6%	2,642	1.2%	45,090	19.7%	229,238

== District 3 ==
2022 New Jersey's 3rd congressional district election
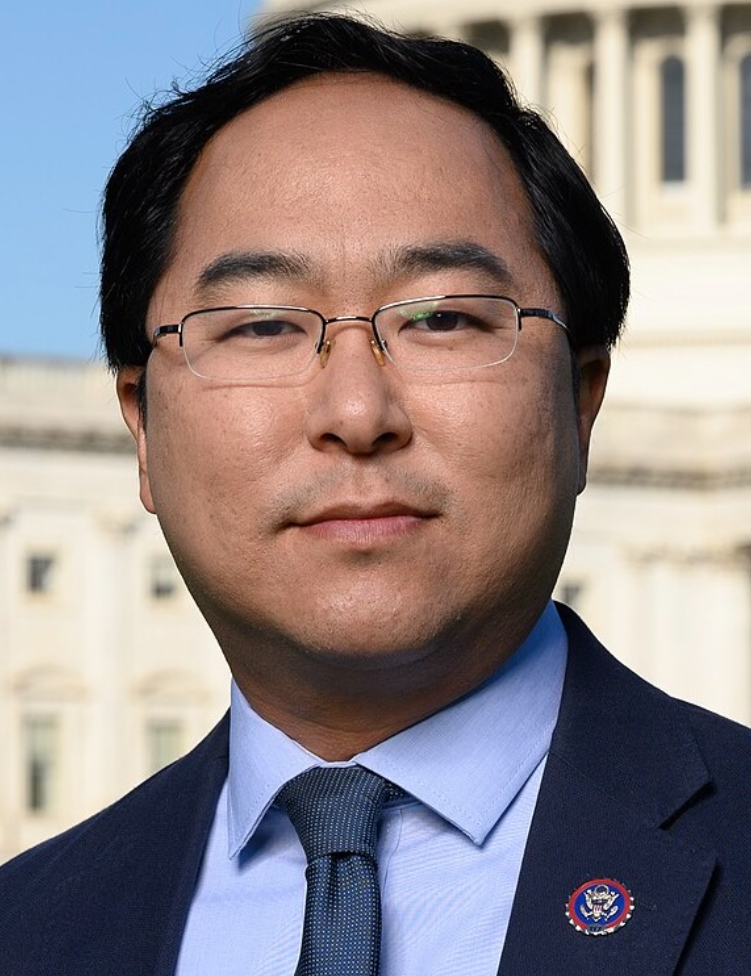

Nominee	Andy Kim	Bob Healey
Party	Democratic	Republican
Popular vote	150,498	118,415
Percentage	55.46%	43.64%
- Kim: 40–50% 50–60% 60–70% 70–80% >90% Healey: 50–60% 60–70% 70–80%
U.S. Representative before election
Andy Kim
Democratic
Elected U.S. Representative
Andy Kim
Democratic

Democrat Andy Kim, who had represented the district since 2019, was re-elected with 53.2% of the vote in 2020.

=== Democratic primary ===
==== Candidates ====
===== Nominee =====
- Andy Kim, incumbent U.S. Representative

===== Eliminated in primary =====
- Reuven Hendler, small business owner

==== Endorsements ====
Andy Kim

Labor unions

- Communications Workers of America
- New Jersey Education Association

Organizations

- Council for a Livable World
- Democracy for America
- End Citizens United
- Garden State Equality
- Giffords
- League of Conservation Voters
- Natural Resources Defense Council
- Sierra Club

==== Results ====
Democratic primary results
Party	Candidate	Votes	%
Democratic	Andy Kim (incumbent)	39,433	92.8
Democratic	Reuven Hendler	3,062	7.2
Total votes		42,495	100.0

=== Republican primary ===
==== Candidates ====
===== Nominee =====
- Robert Healey Jr., yacht manufacturer

===== Eliminated in primary =====
- Nicholas Ferrara, realtor
- Ian Smith, Atilis Gym owner

===== Withdrawn =====
- John Barker, U.S. Army veteran (running in New Jersey's 2nd congressional district)
- Tricia Flanagan, healthcare policy expert, biotech consultant, and candidate for U.S. Senate in 2020 (running in New Jersey's 4th congressional district)
- Shawn Hyland, evangelist and former director of the Family Policy Alliance of New Jersey (filed to run in New Jersey's 4th congressional district, then withdrew)
- Will Monk, Mount Holly school board member

===== Declined =====
- Chris Smith, incumbent U.S. Representative (running in New Jersey's 4th congressional district)

==== Endorsements ====
Robert Healey Jr.

Labor unions

- New Jersey Policemen's Benevolent Association
Ian Smith

Executive branch officials

- Michael Flynn, former U.S. National Security Advisor

==== Results ====
Results by Municipality: Healey: 40–50%; 50–60%; 60–70%; Smith: 40–50%; 50–60%; 60–70%

Republican primary results
Party	Candidate	Votes	%
Republican	Bob Healey	17,560	52.9
Republican	Ian Smith	12,709	38.3
Republican	Nicholas Ferrara	2,956	8.9
Total votes		33,225	100.0

=== General election ===
==== Predictions ====
Source	Ranking	As of
The Cook Political Report	Lean D	November 1, 2022
Inside Elections	Likely D	November 3, 2022
Sabato's Crystal Ball	Likely D	January 4, 2022
Politico	Lean D	November 7, 2022
RCP	Lean D	September 29, 2022
Fox News	Lean D	October 25, 2022
DDHQ	Solid D	November 3, 2022
538	Likely D	June 30, 2022
The Economist	Likely D	September 28, 2022

==== Polling ====
Poll source	Date(s) administered	Sample size	Margin of error	Andy Kim (D)	Bob Healey (R)	Other	Undecided
RMG Research	July 22–29, 2022	400 (LV)	± 4.9%	44%	38%	4%	13%

==== Results ====
2022 New Jersey's 3rd congressional district election
Party	Candidate	Votes	%
Democratic	Andy Kim (incumbent)	150,498	55.46
Republican	Bob Healey	118,415	43.64
Libertarian	Christopher Russomanno	1,347	0.50
Independent	Gregory Sobocinski	1,116	0.41
Total votes		271,376	100.00
Democratic hold			

==== By county ====
County	Andy Kim Democratic		Bob Healey Republican		Various candidates Other parties		Margin		Total votes cast
County	#	%	#	%	#	%	#	%	Total votes cast
Burlington (part)	92,925	58.6%	64,311	40.6%	1,327	0.8%	28,614	20.0%	158,563
Mercer (part)	31,901	60.5%	20,261	38.4%	547	1.1%	11,640	22.1%	52,709
Monmouth (part)	25,672	42.7%	33,843	56.3%	589	1.0%	−8,171	−13.6%	60,104
Totals	124,913	55.2%	99,512	44.0%	1,993	0.9%	25,401	11.2%	226,418

== District 4 ==
2022 New Jersey's 4th congressional district election
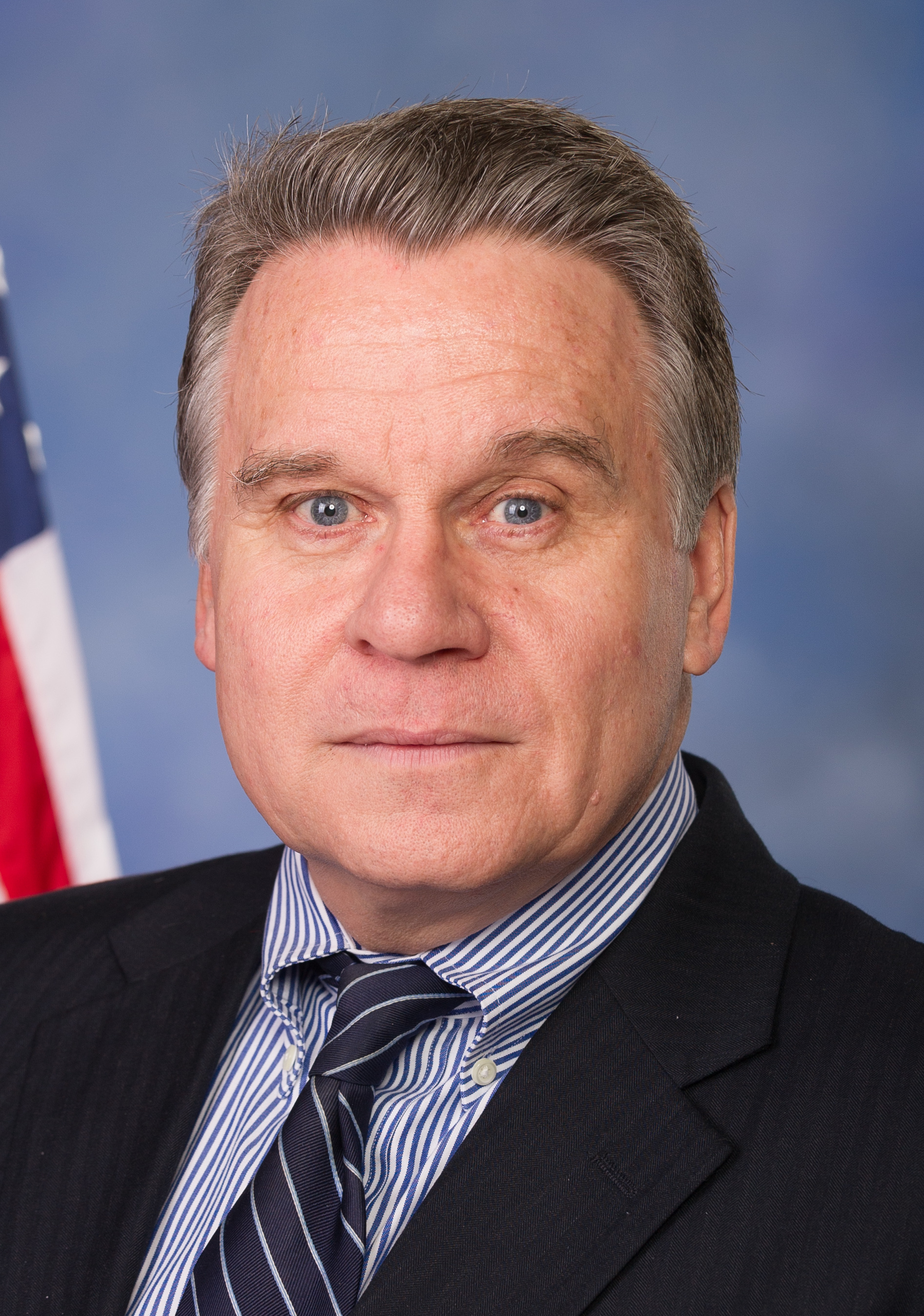

Nominee	Chris Smith	Matthew Jenkins
Party	Republican	Democratic
Popular vote	173,288	81,233
Percentage	66.9%	31.4%
- Smith: 50–60% 60–70% 70–80% 80–90% Jenkins: 40–50% 60–70%
U.S. Representative before election
Chris Smith
Republican
Elected U.S. Representative
Chris Smith
Republican

Republican Chris Smith, who has represented the district since 1981, was re-elected with 59.9% of the vote in 2020.

=== Republican primary ===
==== Candidates ====
===== Nominee =====
- Chris Smith, incumbent U.S. Representative

===== Eliminated in primary =====
- Mike Crispi, conservative TV commentator for Right Side Broadcasting Network
- Steve Gray, former FBI special agent

===== Withdrawn =====
- Mike Blasi, veteran, former corrections officer and realtor (still on the ballot)
- David Burg, former head of litigation for NBCUniversal
- Daniel Francisco, Englishtown councilmember (running for Monmouth County Commissioner, endorsed Crispi)
- Shawn Hyland, evangelist and former director of the Family Policy Alliance of New Jersey (previously filed to run in New Jersey's 3rd congressional district, endorsed Smith)

===== Disqualified =====
- Tricia Flanagan, biotech consultant, and candidate for U.S. Senate in 2020 (previously filed to run in New Jersey's 3rd congressional district)

==== Endorsements ====
Mike Crispi

Executive branch officials

- Michael Flynn, 25th United States National Security Advisor (2017) (Democratic)

State and local officials

- Daniel Francisco, Englishtown councilmember (2019–present) and candidate for Monmouth County Commissioner; former candidate for this seat
- Rudy Giuliani, former mayor of New York City (1994–2001), former United States Attorney for the Southern District of New York (1983–1989), and former United States Associate Attorney General (1981–1983)
- Steve Rogers, former Nutley Commissioner of Public Affairs (2012–2019) and 2017 gubernatorial candidate
- Wendy Rogers, state senator from Arizona's 6th legislative district (2021–present)

Individuals

- Kari Lake, former television news journalist and Arizona gubernatorial candidate
- Bill Spadea, talk show host and businessman
- Roger Stone, political activist and consultant

Organizations

- New York Young Republican Club
- Republican Liberty Caucus
Chris Smith

U.S. Representatives

- Newt Gingrich, former Speaker of the House (1995–1999), former U.S. Representative from Georgia's 6th congressional district (1979–1999)
- Kevin McCarthy, house minority leader (2019–present), U.S. Representative from California's 22nd congressional district (2007–2013) and California's 23rd congressional district (2013–)
- Steve Scalise, house minority whip (2019–present), U.S. Representative from Louisiana's 1st congressional district (2008–present)
- Elise Stefanik, chair of the House Republican Conference (2021–present), U.S. Representative from New York's 21st congressional district (2015–present)

Individuals

- Shawn Hyland, evangelist and former director of the Family Policy Alliance of New Jersey, former candidate New Jersey's 3rd congressional district and New Jersey's 4th congressional district

Organizations

- Family Research Council Action PAC
- Pro-Israel America
- Susan B. Anthony List
- United States Chamber of Commerce

==== Results ====
Republican primary results
Party	Candidate	Votes	%
Republican	Chris Smith (incumbent)	33,136	57.8
Republican	Mike Crispi	21,115	36.8
Republican	Steve Gray	2,305	4.0
Republican	Mike Blasi (withdrawn)	751	1.3
Total votes		57,307	100.0

=== Democratic primary ===
==== Candidates ====
===== Nominee =====
- Matthew Jenkins, small business owner

===== Declined =====
- Abigail Spanberger, incumbent U.S. Representative from Virginia's 7th congressional district (2019–2025) (ran for re-election)

==== Results ====
Democratic primary results
Party	Candidate	Votes	%
Democratic	Matthew Jenkins	20,655	100.0
Total votes		20,655	100.0

=== General election ===
==== Predictions ====
Source	Ranking	As of
The Cook Political Report	Solid R	June 15, 2022
Inside Elections	Solid R	January 10, 2022
Sabato's Crystal Ball	Safe R	January 4, 2022
Politico	Solid R	April 5, 2022
RCP	Safe R	June 9, 2022
Fox News	Solid R	July 11, 2022
DDHQ	Solid R	July 20, 2022
538	Solid R	June 30, 2022
The Economist	Safe R	September 28, 2022

==== Results ====
2022 New Jersey's 4th congressional district election
Party	Candidate	Votes	%
Republican	Chris Smith (incumbent)	173,288	66.9
Democratic	Matthew Jenkins	81,233	31.4
Libertarian	Jason Cullen	1,902	0.7
Independent	David Schmidt	1,197	0.5
Independent	Hank Schroeder	905	0.3
Independent	Pam Daniels	437	0.2
Total votes		258,962	100.0
Republican hold			

==== By county ====
County	Chris Smith Republican		Matthew Jenkins Democratic		Various candidates Other parties		Margin		Total votes cast
County	#	%	#	%	#	%	#	%	Total votes cast
Monmouth (part)	57,864	60.8%	35,245	37.0%	2,126	2.2%	22,619	23.8%	95,235
Ocean (part)	115,424	70.5%	45,988	28.1%	2,315	1.4%	69,436	42.4%	163,727
Totals	170,423	67.1%	79,377	31.2%	4,354	1.7%	91,046	35.9%	254,154

== District 5 ==
2022 New Jersey's 5th congressional district election
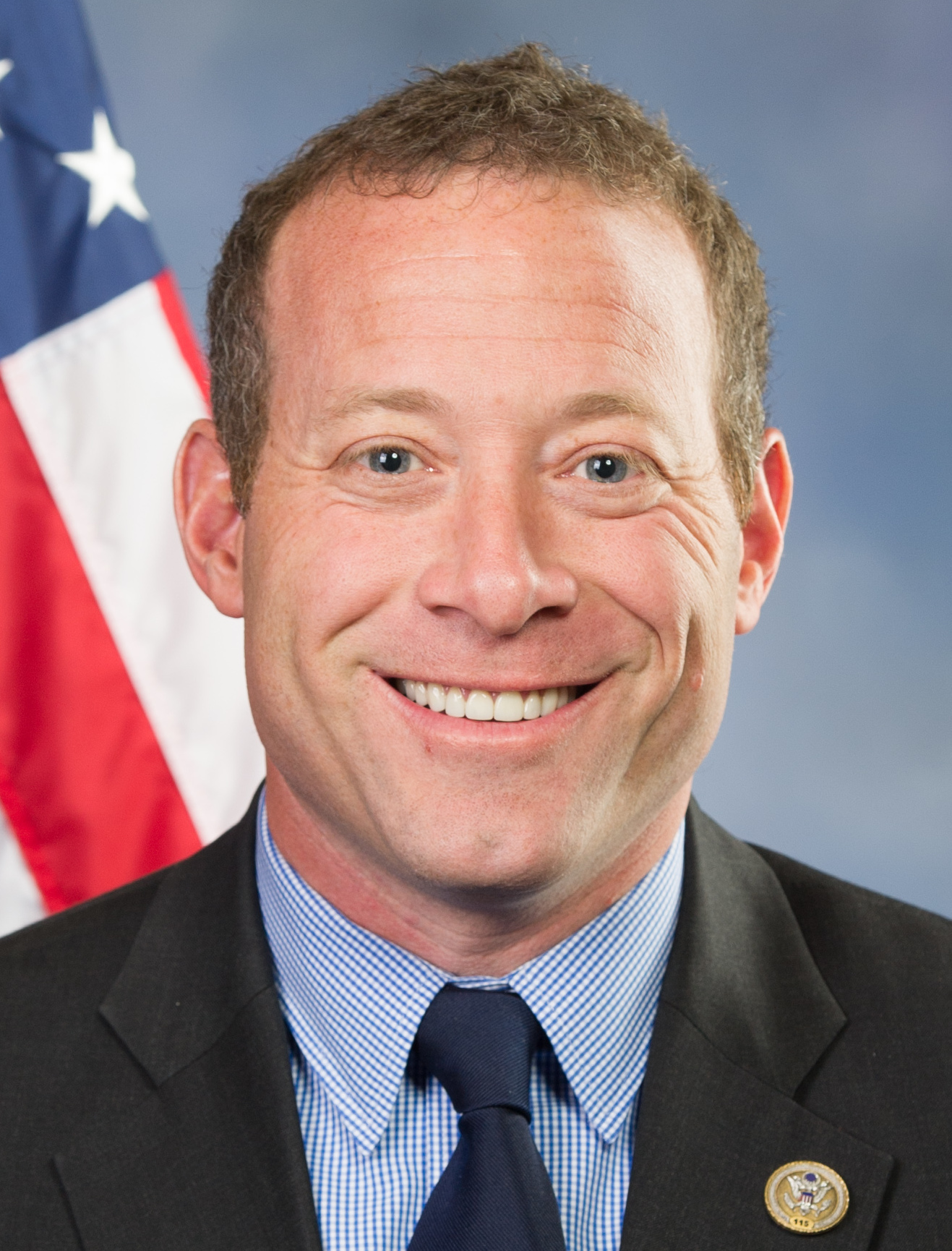

Nominee	Josh Gottheimer	Frank Pallotta
Party	Democratic	Republican
Popular vote	145,559	117,873
Percentage	54.7%	44.3%
- Gottheimer: 50–60% 60–70% 70–80% Pallotta: 40–50% 50–60% 60–70%
U.S. Representative before election
Josh Gottheimer
Democratic
Elected U.S. Representative
Josh Gottheimer
Democratic

Democrat Josh Gottheimer, who had represented the district since 2017, was re-elected with 53.2% of the vote in 2020.

=== Democratic primary ===
==== Candidates ====
===== Nominee =====
- Josh Gottheimer, incumbent U.S. Representative

==== Endorsements ====
Josh Gottheimer

Organizations

- Pro-Israel America
- United States Chamber of Commerce

==== Results ====
Democratic primary results
Party	Candidate	Votes	%
Democratic	Josh Gottheimer (incumbent)	31,142	100.0
Total votes		31,142	100.0

=== Republican primary ===
==== Candidates ====
===== Nominee =====
- Frank Pallotta, former investment banker and nominee for New Jersey's 5th congressional district in 2020

===== Eliminated in primary =====
- Nick DeGregorio, veteran
- Sab Skenderi

===== Withdrawn =====
- Nicholas D'Agostino, president of the Sussex-Wantage Regional Board of Education and motivational speaker (running for Sussex County Commissioner)
- John Flora, mayor of Fredon (2018–present) (running in New Jersey's 7th congressional district)
- Fred Schneiderman, businessman (still on the ballot)

==== Endorsements ====
Nicholas D'Agostino (withdrawn)

U.S. Representatives

- Gus Bilirakis, U.S. Representative for FL-12 (2013–present; FL-09 from 2007–2013)
Nick DeGregorio

Organizations

- SEAL PAC

State legislators

- Robert Auth, New Jersey Assemblymember from the 39th district (2014-present)
- DeAnne DeFuccio, New Jersey Assemblymember from the 39th district (2021-present)

==== Results ====
Republican primary results
Party	Candidate	Votes	%
Republican	Frank Pallotta	16,021	50.2
Republican	Nick de Gregorio	14,560	45.6
Republican	Sab Skenderi	712	2.2
Republican	Fred Schneiderman (withdrawn)	629	2.0
Total votes		31,922	100.0

=== General election ===
==== Forum ====
2022 New Jersey's 5th congressional district candidate forum
No.	Date	Host	Moderator	Link	Democratic	Republican	Libertarian	Independent	Independent
Key: P Participant A Absent N Not invited I Invited W Withdrawn									
Key: P Participant A Absent N Not invited I Invited W Withdrawn					Josh Gottheimer	Frank Pallotta	Jeremy Marcus	Trevor Ferrigno	Louis Vellucci
1	Oct. 27, 2022	League of Women Voters of Bergen County	Michelle; Bobrow		P	P	A	P	P

==== Predictions ====
Source	Ranking	As of
The Cook Political Report	Likely D	June 15, 2022
Inside Elections	Solid D	January 10, 2022
Sabato's Crystal Ball	Likely D	January 4, 2022
Politico	Likely D	April 5, 2022
RCP	Lean D	September 29, 2022
Fox News	Likely D	July 11, 2022
DDHQ	Solid D	July 20, 2022
538	Likely D	October 18, 2022
The Economist	Likely D	November 1, 2022

==== Post-primary endorsements ====
Josh Gottheimer (D)

U.S. Executive Branch officials

- Bill Clinton, former president of the United States

Labor unions

- New Jersey Education Association

Organizations

- Garden State Equality
- League of Conservation Voters
- Sierra Club
Frank Pallotta (R)

U.S. Executive Branch officials

- Mike Pence, former vice president of the United States

U.S. Representatives

- Steve Scalise, House Minority Whip

State senators

- Kristin Corrado, New Jersey State Senator
- Joseph Pennacchio, New Jersey State Senator

State assembly members

- BettyLou DeCroce, New Jersey Assemblymember
- John DiMaio, New Jersey Assemblymember
- Holly Schepisi, New Jersey Assemblymember

County Republican Party organizations

- Passaic County

==== Results ====
2022 New Jersey's 5th congressional district election
Party	Candidate	Votes	%
Democratic	Josh Gottheimer (incumbent)	145,559	54.7
Republican	Frank Pallotta	117,873	44.3
Libertarian	Jeremy Marcus	1,193	0.5
Independent	Trevor Ferrigno	700	0.3
Independent	Louis Vellucci	618	0.2
Total votes		265,943	100.0
Democratic hold			

==== By county ====
County	Josh Gottheimer Democratic		Frank Pallotta Republican		Various candidates Other parties		Margin		Total votes cast
County	#	%	#	%	#	%	#	%	Total votes cast
Bergen (part)	124,644	58.7%	86,061	40.5%	1,674	0.8%	38,583	18.2%	212,379
Passaic (part)	9,547	43.1%	12,266	55.3%	353	1.6%	−2,719	−12.2%	22,166
Sussex (part)	11,368	36.2%	19,546	62.3%	484	1.5%	−8,178	−26.1%	31,398
Totals	141,039	54.4%	115,906	44.7%	2,465	1.0%	25,133	9.7%	259,410

== District 6 ==
2022 New Jersey's 6th congressional district election
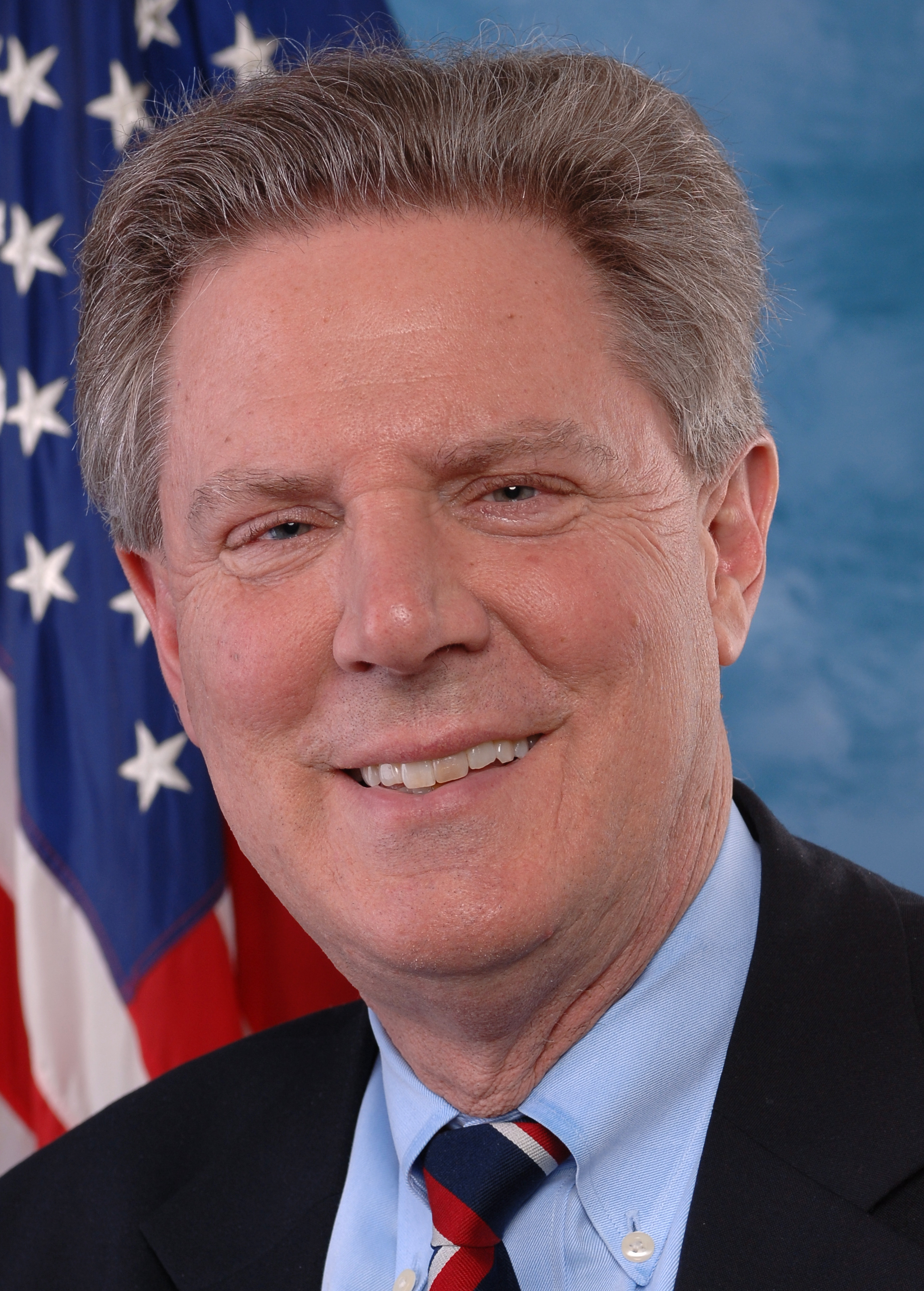

Nominee	Frank Pallone	Sue Kiley
Party	Democratic	Republican
Popular vote	106,238	75,839
Percentage	57.5%	41.0%
- Pallone: 50–60% 60–70% 70–80% 80–90% Kiley: 40–50% 50–60% 60–70% 70–80%
U.S. Representative before election
Frank Pallone
Democratic
Elected U.S. Representative
Frank Pallone
Democratic

Democrat Frank Pallone, who had represented the district since 1993, was re-elected with 61.2% of the vote in 2020.

=== Democratic primary ===
==== Candidates ====
===== Nominee =====
- Frank Pallone, incumbent U.S. Representative

==== Endorsements ====
Frank Pallone

Labor unions

- Communications Workers of America
- New Jersey Education Association

Organizations

- Garden State Equality
- League of Conservation Voters
- Sierra Club

==== Results ====
Democratic primary results
Party	Candidate	Votes	%
Democratic	Frank Pallone (incumbent)	30,534	100.0
Total votes		30,534	100.0

=== Republican primary ===
==== Candidates ====
===== Nominee =====
- Sue Kiley, Monmouth County Commissioner

===== Eliminated in primary =====
- Rik Mehta, pharmaceutical executive, attorney, and nominee for U.S. Senate in 2020 (previously filed to run in New Jersey's 7th congressional district)
- Tom Toomey, businessman (previously filed to run in New Jersey's 11th congressional district)

Withdrawn

- Gregg Mele, Libertarian nominee for governor in 2021

==== Endorsements ====
Sue Kiley

State legislators

- Sam Thompson, SD-12 (2012-present) (1998-2012)

==== Results ====
Republican primary results
Party	Candidate	Votes	%
Republican	Susan Kiley	10,076	56.8
Republican	Rik Mehta	4,735	26.7
Republican	Thomas Toomey	2,913	16.4
Total votes		17,724	100.0

=== General election ===
==== Predictions ====
Source	Ranking	As of
The Cook Political Report	Solid D	June 15, 2022
Inside Elections	Solid D	January 10, 2022
Sabato's Crystal Ball	Safe D	January 4, 2022
Politico	Solid D	April 5, 2022
RCP	Safe D	June 9, 2022
Fox News	Solid D	July 11, 2022
DDHQ	Solid D	July 20, 2022
538	Solid D	September 29, 2022
The Economist	Safe D	November 7, 2022

==== Results ====
2022 New Jersey's 6th congressional district election
Party	Candidate	Votes	%
Democratic	Frank Pallone (incumbent)	106,238	57.5
Republican	Sue Kiley	75,839	41.0
Libertarian	Tara Fisher	1,361	0.7
Independent	Inder Soni	947	0.5
Independent	Eric Antisell	534	0.3
Total votes		184,919	100.0
Democratic hold			

==== By county ====
County	Frank Pallone Democratic		Sue Kiley Republican		Various candidates Other parties		Margin		Total votes cast
County	#	%	#	%	#	%	#	%	Total votes cast
Middlesex (part)	67,778	61.4%	40,716	36.9%	1,878	1.6%	27,062	24.5%	110,372
Monmouth (part)	38,460	51.6%	35,123	47.1%	964	1.3%	3,337	4.5%	74,547
Totals	101,930	57.2%	73,717	41.3%	2,703	1.5%	28,213	15.9%	178,350

== District 7 ==
2022 New Jersey's 7th congressional district election
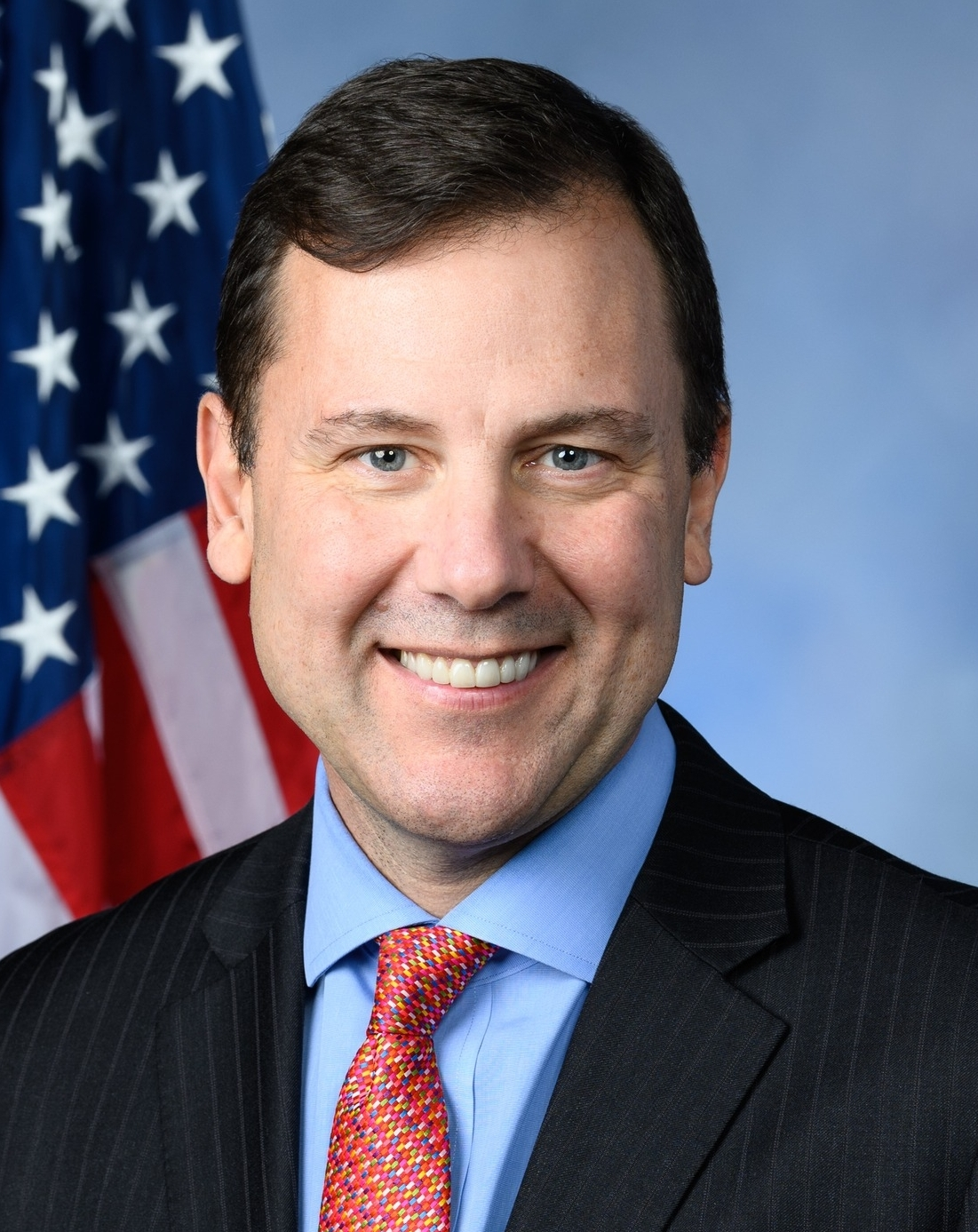

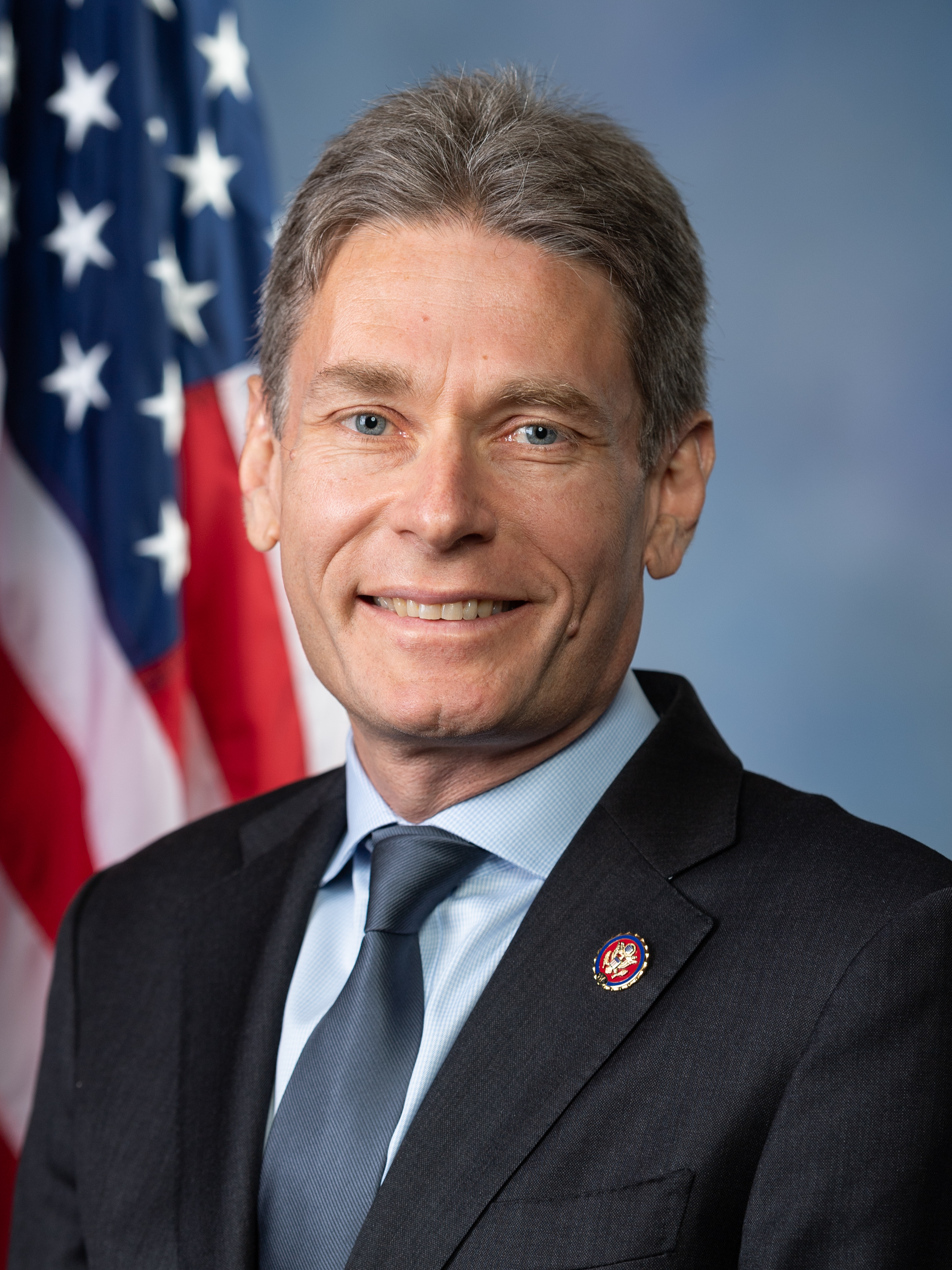
Nominee	Thomas Kean Jr.	Tom Malinowski
Party	Republican	Democratic
Popular vote	159,392	150,701
Percentage	51.4%	48.6%
- Kean: 50–60% 60–70% 70–80% 80–90% Malinowski: 50–60% 60–70% 70–80% 80–90%
U.S. Representative before election
Tom Malinowski
Democratic
Elected U.S. Representative
Thomas Kean Jr.
Republican

Democrat Tom Malinowski, who had represented the district since 2019, was re-elected with 50.6% of the vote in 2020. Malinowski was unseated by Republican Thomas Kean, and afterward said he would not run for the seat in 2024.

The boundaries of the district had been redrawn from 2020 determined by the 2020 redistricting cycle. The district was drawn to be more Republican-leaning in order for surrounding districts to become more Democratic-leaning. This protected two other vulnerable Democratic incumbents, at the cost of Malinowski facing an even tougher reelection bid in 2022.

=== Democratic primary ===
==== Candidates ====
===== Nominee =====
- Tom Malinowski, incumbent U.S. Representative

===== Eliminated in primary =====
- Roger Bacon

==== Endorsements ====
Tom Malinowski

Labor unions

- Communications Workers of America
- New Jersey Education Association

Organizations

- American Israel Public Affairs Committee
- Council for a Livable World
- End Citizens United
- Feminist Majority PAC
- Garden State Equality
- Giffords
- Humane Society of the United States Legislative Fund
- League of Conservation Voters
- NARAL Pro-Choice America
- National Iranian American Council
- National Organization for Women
- Natural Resources Defense Council
- Planned Parenthood Action Fund
- Sierra Club

Newspapers

- The Star-Ledger (post primary)

==== Results ====
Democratic primary results
Party	Candidate	Votes	%
Democratic	Tom Malinowski (incumbent)	37,304	94.5
Democratic	Roger Bacon	2,185	5.5
Total votes		39,489	100.0

=== Republican primary ===
==== Candidates ====
===== Nominee =====
- Thomas Kean Jr., minority leader of the New Jersey Senate and nominee for this seat in 2020, and nominee for the U.S. Senate in 2006

===== Eliminated in primary =====
- Kevin Dorlon, public works contractor
- John Flora, mayor of Fredon (2018–present) (previously filed to run in New Jersey's 5th congressional district)
- John Henry Isemann, businessman
- Erik Peterson, New Jersey Assemblymember from the 23rd district (2009–present), member of the Hunterdon County Board of Chosen Freeholders (2006–2009)
- Phil Rizzo, pastor and candidate for governor in 2021 (previously filed to run in New Jersey's 11th congressional district)
- Sterling Irwin Schwab, U.S. Navy Veteran

===== Withdrawn =====
- Rik Mehta, pharmaceutical executive, attorney, and nominee for U.S. Senate in 2020 (running in New Jersey's 6th congressional district)
- Robert Trugman, salon owner

==== Endorsements ====
Thomas Kean Jr.

Executive Branch officials

- Mike Pompeo, United States Secretary of State (2018–2021), Director of the CIA (2017–2018), U.S. Representative for Kansas's 4th congressional district (2011–2017)

U.S. Senators

- Tim Scott, U.S. Senator from South Carolina (2013–present)

U.S. Representatives

- Kevin McCarthy, house minority leader (2019–2023), U.S. Representative from California's 22nd congressional district (2007-2013) and California's 23rd congressional district (2013–)
- Steve Scalise, house minority whip (2019–), U.S. Representative from Louisiana's 1st congressional district (2008–)
- Elise Stefanik, Chair of the House Republican Conference (2021–present) and U.S. Representative from NY-21 (2015–present)
- Jeff Van Drew, U.S. Representative from NJ-02 (2019–present)

State and local officials

- Jack Ciattarelli, former state assemblyman, Republican nominee for governor in 2021 and candidate for governor in 2017

Organizations

- Congressional Leadership Fund
- National Federation of Independent Business
- New Jersey Hills Media Group
- New Jersey State Police Benevolent Association
- Operating Engineers Local 825
- Tea Party Express
- United States Chamber of Commerce

County Republican parties

- Hunterdon County
- Morris County
- Somerset County
- Union County
- Warren County
Erik Peterson

Organizations

- New Jersey Second Amendment Society
Phil Rizzo

U.S. Representatives

- Madison Cawthorn, U.S. Representative from NC-11 (2021–present)

==== Results ====
Republican primary results
Party	Candidate	Votes	%
Republican	Thomas Kean Jr.	25,111	45.6
Republican	Phil Rizzo	12,988	23.6
Republican	Erik Peterson	8,493	15.4
Republican	John Flora	3,051	5.5
Republican	John Henry Isemann	2,732	5.0
Republican	Kevin Dorlon	2,237	4.1
Republican	Sterling Schwab	429	0.8
Total votes		55,041	100.0

=== General election ===
Veronica Fernandez was running for this seat as an independent, but later dropped out, citing no path to victory.

On June 7, it was announced that the newly formed Moderate Party would seek to nominate Malinowski as their candidate via electoral fusion, although fusion voting is currently banned in New Jersey. The next day, the Secretary of State Tahesha Way blocked the nomination, but the Moderate Party filed a lawsuit to challenge this. However, a ruling was not expected until the summer of 2023, preventing them from being on the ballot.

==== Predictions ====
Source	Ranking	As of
The Cook Political Report	Lean R (flip)	June 15, 2022
Inside Elections	Tilt R (flip)	October 21, 2022
Sabato's Crystal Ball	Lean R (flip)	January 4, 2022
Politico	Lean R (flip)	April 5, 2022
RCP	Lean R (flip)	June 9, 2022
Fox News	Lean R (flip)	July 11, 2022
DDHQ	Tossup	October 6, 2022
538	Lean R (flip)	June 30, 2022
The Economist	Tossup	September 28, 2022

==== Polling ====
Poll source	Date(s) administered	Sample size	Margin of error	Tom Malinowski (D)	Tom Kean Jr. (R)	Undecided
GQR Research (D) (Note: This poll was sponsored by Malinowski's campaign.)	September 26–29, 2022	500 (LV)	± 4.4%	48%	48%	4%
RMG Research	July 23–28, 2022	400 (LV)	± 4.9%	38%	46%	11%
GQR Research (D)	January 19–27, 2022	600 (LV)	± 4.0%	46%	46%	8%

Hypothetical polling

Generic Democrat vs. generic Republican

Poll source	Date(s) administered	Sample size	Margin of error	Generic Democrat	Generic Republican	Undecided
GQR Research (D)	September 26–29, 2022	500 (LV)	± 4.4%	45%	50%	5%

==== Results ====
2022 New Jersey's 7th congressional district election
Party	Candidate	Votes	%
Republican	Tom Kean Jr.	159,392	51.4
Democratic	Tom Malinowski (incumbent)	150,701	48.6
Total votes		310,093	100.0
Republican gain from Democratic			

==== By county ====
County	Thomas Kean Jr. Republican		Tom Malinowski Democratic		Margin		Total votes cast
County	#	%	#	%	#	%	Total votes cast
Hunterdon	32,678	54.2%	27,657	45.8%	5,021	8.4%	60,335
Morris (part)	25,684	54.8%	21,164	45.2%	4,520	9.6%	46,848
Somerset (part)	32,088	49.7%	32,452	50.3%	-364	-0.6%	64,540
Sussex (part)	14,752	62.0%	9,050	38.0%	5,702	24.0%	23,802
Union (part)	30,193	39.9%	45,428	60.1%	−15,235	−20.2%	75,621
Warren	23,997	61.6%	14,950	38.4%	9,047	23.2%	38,947
Totals	159,392	51.4%	150,701	48.6%	8,691	2.8%	310,093

== District 8 ==
2022 New Jersey's 8th congressional district election
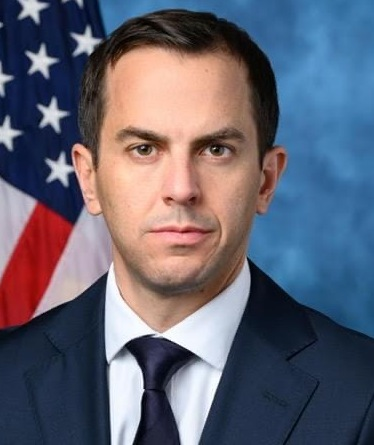

Nominee	Rob Menendez	Marcos Arroyo
Party	Democratic	Republican
Popular vote	78,382	24,957
Percentage	73.6%	23.4%
- Menendez: 40–50% 50–60% 60–70% 70–80% 80–90%
U.S. Representative before election
Albio Sires
Democratic
Elected U.S. Representative
Rob Menendez
Democratic

Democrat Albio Sires, who had represented the district since 2006, was re-elected with 74.0% of the vote in 2020. In December 2021, Sires announced he would not seek re-election.

=== Democratic primary ===
==== Candidates ====
===== Nominee =====
- Robert Menendez, Commissioner of the Port Authority of New York and New Jersey and son of U.S. Senator Bob Menendez

===== Eliminated in primary =====
- David Ocampo Grajales, progressive activist and healthcare startup director
- Ane Roseborough-Eberhard, teacher

===== Disqualified =====
- Brian Varela, entrepreneur

===== Withdrawn =====
- Ricardo Rojas, co-founder of the Progressive Democrats of New Jersey

===== Declined =====
- Ravinder Bhalla, Mayor of Hoboken (2018–present), former member of the Hoboken City Council At-Large (2009–2017), and candidate for New Jersey's 33rd assembly district in 2011 and 2013 (endorsed Menendez)
- Nicholas Chiaravalloti, former Majority Whip of the New Jersey General Assembly (2020–2022), former New Jersey State Assemblymember from the 31st district (2016–2022) (endorsed Menendez)
- Michael Melham, mayor of Belleville (2019–present) (Independent)
- Raj Mukherji, former Majority Whip of the New Jersey General Assembly (2018–2019), New Jersey State Assemblymember from the 33rd district (2014–present), former Deputy Mayor of Jersey City (2012–2013), Commissioner & Chairman of the Jersey City Housing Authority (2008–present) (endorsed Menendez)
- Hector Oseguera, lawyer and candidate for this district in 2020
- Teresa Ruiz, New Jersey State Senator from the 29th district (2008–present)
- Albio Sires, incumbent U.S. Representative
- James Solomon, Jersey City councilman
- Brian Stack, New Jersey State Senator from the 33rd district (2008–present), former New Jersey State Assemblymember from the 33rd district (2004–2008), Mayor of Union City (2000–present) (endorsed Menendez)

==== Endorsements ====
David Ocampo Grajales

Organizations

- Center for Biological Diversity Action Fund
- Peace Action

Individuals

- Marianne Williamson, author and candidate for the Democratic nomination for President of the United States in 2020
Robert J. Menendez

U.S. Senators

- Cory Booker, U.S. Senator from New Jersey (2013–)

U.S. Representatives

- Albio Sires, incumbent U.S. Representative

Governors

- Phil Murphy, Governor of New Jersey (2018–present)

State legislators

- Annette Chaparro, New Jersey State Assemblymember from the 33rd district (2016–present)
- Nicholas Chiaravalloti, Majority Whip of the New Jersey General Assembly (2020–present), New Jersey State Assemblymember from the 31st district (2016–present)
- Joseph Cryan, New Jersey State Senator from the 20th district (2018–present), former New Jersey State Assemblymember from the 20th district (2002–2015), former Majority Leader of the New Jersey General Assembly (2010–2012)
- Angelica M. Jimenez, New Jersey State Assemblymember from the 32nd district (2012–present)
- Angela V. McKnight, New Jersey State Assemblymember from the 31st district (2016–present)
- Pedro Mejia, New Jersey State Assemblymember from the 32nd district (2018–present)
- Raj Mukherji, Majority Whip of the New Jersey General Assembly (2018–2019), New Jersey State Assemblymember from the 33rd district (2014–present), former Deputy Mayor of Jersey City (2012–2013), Commissioner & Chairman of the Jersey City Housing Authority (2008–present)
- Nicholas Sacco, New Jersey State Senator from the 32nd district (1994-present), Mayor of North Bergen (1991–present)
- William Sampson, New Jersey State Assemblymember from the 31st district (2022–present)
- Nicholas Scutari, President-designate of the New Jersey Senate, New Jersey State Senator from the 22nd district (2004–present)
- Brian P. Stack, New Jersey State Senator from the 33rd district (2008–present), former New Jersey State Assemblymember from the 33rd district (2004–2008), Mayor of Union City (2000–present)

Organizations

- Communications Workers of America
- Congressional Hispanic Caucus BOLD PAC
- Garden State Equality
- Laborers' International Union of North America
- Latino Victory Fund
- Pro-Israel America
- Transport Workers Union of America (post primary)

Local officials

- Ravinder Bhalla, Mayor of Hoboken (2018–present), former member of the Hoboken City Council At-Large (2009–2017)
- Christian Bollwage, Mayor of Elizabeth (1993-present)
- Steven Fulop, Mayor of Jersey City (2013–present), former member of the Jersey City council from Ward E (2005–2013)
Brian Varela (disqualified)

Individuals

- Andrew Yang, leader of the Forward Party (2021–present), Presidential Ambassador for Global Entrepreneurship (2015–2017)

Organizations

- Forward Party
Declined to endorse

U.S. Senators

- Bob Menendez, U.S. Senator from New Jersey (2007–present) (Menendez's father)

==== Debates and forums ====
2022 NJ-08 Democratic primary debates and forums
No.	Date	Host	Moderator	Link	Participants		
P Participant A Absent N Non-invitee I Invitee W Withdrawn							
P Participant A Absent N Non-invitee I Invitee W Withdrawn					Menendez	Ocampo Grajales	Roseborough-Eberhard
1	May 20, 2022	Hudson Media Group	John Heinis		P	P	P

==== Results ====
Democratic primary results
Party	Candidate	Votes	%
Democratic	Robert J. Menendez	26,490	83.0
Democratic	David Ocampo Grajales	3,749	11.7
Democratic	Ane Roseborough-Eberhard	1,668	5.2
Total votes		31,907	100.0

=== Republican primary ===
==== Candidates ====
===== Nominee =====
- Marcos Arroyo, housing inspector

===== Withdrawn =====
- Ana Isabel Rivera, plumber's apprentice (previously filed to run in New Jersey's 10th congressional district)

===== Declined =====
- Michael Melham, mayor of Belleville (2019–present) (Independent)
- David Winkler, perennial candidate

==== Results ====
Republican primary results
Party	Candidate	Votes	%
Republican	Marcos Arroyo	3,127	100.0
Total votes		3,127	100.0

=== Independent and third-party candidates ===
==== Candidates ====
- Joanne Kuniansky, gubernatorial candidate for Socialist Workers Party

===== Declined =====
- Michael Melham, mayor of Belleville (2019–present)

=== General election ===
==== Predictions ====
Source	Ranking	As of
The Cook Political Report	Solid D	June 15, 2022
Inside Elections	Solid D	January 10, 2022
Sabato's Crystal Ball	Safe D	January 4, 2022
Politico	Solid D	April 5, 2022
RCP	Safe D	June 9, 2022
Fox News	Solid D	July 11, 2022
DDHQ	Solid D	July 20, 2022
538	Solid D	June 30, 2022
The Economist	Safe D	September 28, 2022

==== Results ====
2022 New Jersey's 8th congressional district election
Party	Candidate	Votes	%
Democratic	Robert Menendez	78,382	73.6
Republican	Marcos Arroyo	24,957	23.4
Socialist Workers	Joanne Kuniansky	1,016	0.9
Libertarian	Dan Delaney	758	0.7
Independent	David Cook	714	0.7
Independent	Pablo Olivera	400	0.4
Independent	John Salierno	246	0.2
Total votes		106,473	100.0
Democratic hold			

==== By county ====
County	Rob Menendez Democratic		Marcos Arroyo Republican		Various candidates Other parties		Margin		Total votes cast
County	#	%	#	%	#	%	#	%	Total votes cast
Essex (part)	6,295	77.2%	1,589	19.5%	266	3.3%	4,706	67.7%	8,150
Hudson (part)	56,372	73.0%	18,591	24.1%	2,215	2.8%	37,781	48.9%	77,178
Union (part)	8,170	68.9%	3,360	28.3%	334	2.8%	4,810	40.6%	11,864
Totals	78,371	73.6%	24,956	23.4%	3,133	2.9%	53,415	50.2%	106,460

== District 9 ==
2022 New Jersey's 9th congressional district election
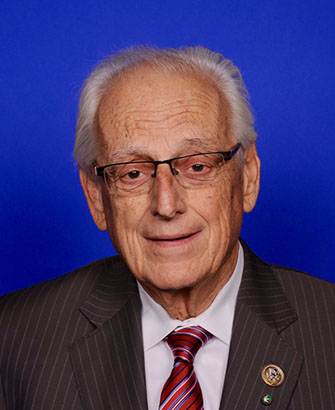

Nominee	Bill Pascrell	Billy Prempeh
Party	Democratic	Republican
Popular vote	82,457	65,365
Percentage	55.0%	43.6%
- Pascrell: 40–50% 50–60% 60–70% 70–80% 80–90% Prempeh: 50–60% 60–70%
U.S. Representative before election
Bill Pascrell
Democratic
Elected U.S. Representative
Bill Pascrell
Democratic

Democrat Bill Pascrell, who had represented the district since 1997, was re-elected with 65.8% of the vote in 2020. Pascrell would also not live to finish term along with Payne Jr. as he died on August 21, 2024.

=== Democratic primary ===
==== Candidates ====
===== Nominee =====
- Bill Pascrell, incumbent U.S. Representative

==== Endorsements ====
Bill Pascrell

Labor unions

- Communications Workers of America
- New Jersey Education Association

Organizations

- Garden State Equality
- League of Conservation Voters
- Sierra Club

==== Results ====
Democratic primary results
Party	Candidate	Votes	%
Democratic	Bill Pascrell (incumbent)	19,524	100.0
Total votes		19,524	100.0

=== Republican primary ===
==== Candidates ====
===== Nominee =====
- Billy Prempeh, U.S. Air Force veteran and nominee for New Jersey's 9th congressional district in 2020

==== Endorsements ====
Billy Prempeh

U.S. Representatives

- Jeff Van Drew, U.S. Representative from New Jersey's 2nd congressional district (2019–present)

Organizations

- New York Young Republican Club

==== Results ====
Republican primary results
Party	Candidate	Votes	%
Republican	Billy Prempeh	10,724	100.0
Total votes		10,724	100.0

=== General election ===
Lea Sherman was running for this seat with the Socialist Workers Party.

==== Predictions ====
Source	Ranking	As of
The Cook Political Report	Solid D	June 15, 2022
Inside Elections	Solid D	January 10, 2022
Sabato's Crystal Ball	Safe D	January 4, 2022
Politico	Solid D	April 5, 2022
RCP	Likely D	November 2, 2022
Fox News	Solid D	July 11, 2022
DDHQ	Solid D	July 20, 2022
538	Solid D	June 30, 2022
The Economist	Safe D	September 28, 2022

==== Results ====
2022 New Jersey's 9th congressional district election
Party	Candidate	Votes	%
Democratic	Bill Pascrell (incumbent)	82,457	55.0
Republican	Billy Prempeh	65,365	43.6
Socialist Workers	Lea Sherman	1,108	0.7
Libertarian	Sean Armstrong	1,054	0.7
Total votes		149,984	100.0
Democratic hold			

==== By county ====
County	Bill Pascrell Democratic		Billy Prempeh Republican		Various candidates Other parties		Margin		Total votes cast
County	#	%	#	%	#	%	#	%	Total votes cast
Bergen (part)	38,657	50.0%	37,647	48.7%	965	1.3%	1,010	1.3%	77,269
Hudson (part)	5,232	57.5%	3,678	40.4%	190	2.1%	1,554	17.1%	9,100
Passaic (part)	38,226	60.6%	23,889	37.9%	998	1.6%	14,337	22.7%	63,113
Totals	82,457	55.0%	65,365	43.6%	2,162	1.4%	17,092	11.4%	149,984

== District 10 ==
2022 New Jersey's 10th congressional district election
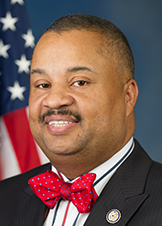

Nominee	Donald Payne Jr.	David Pinckney
Party	Democratic	Republican
Popular vote	100,710	25,993
Percentage	77.6%	20.0%
- Payne Jr.: 40–50% 60–70% 70–80% 80–90% >90% Pinckney: 50–60%
U.S. Representative before election
Donald Payne Jr.
Democratic
Elected U.S. Representative
Donald Payne Jr.
Democratic

Democrat Donald Payne Jr., who had represented the district since 2012, was re-elected with 83.3% of the vote in 2020. Payne won re-election but did not live to finish his term as he died from a heart attack on April 24, 2024, at the age of 65.

=== Democratic primary ===
==== Candidates ====
===== Nominee =====
- Donald Payne Jr., incumbent U.S. Representative

===== Eliminated in primary =====
- Akil Khalfani, sociology professor
- Imani Oakley, activist

==== Endorsements ====
Imani Oakley

Organizations

- Brand New Congress
- Building Bridges for America
- Center for Biological Diversity Action Fund
- FutureGen PAC
- Harvard College Democrats, College Democrats of America chapter
- Roadmap for Progress PAC

Local officials

- Dean Dafis, Mayor of Maplewood (2022–present)

Individuals

- Zellie Thomas, Black Lives Matter activist
- Marianne Williamson, author and candidate for the Democratic nomination for President of the United States in 2020
Donald Payne Jr.

U.S. Senators

- Cory Booker, United States Senator from New Jersey (2013–present)
- Bob Menendez, United States Senator from New Jersey (2006–present)

U.S. Representatives

- Bonnie Watson Coleman, U.S. Representative from New Jersey's 12th congressional district (2015–)
- Pramila Jayapal, U.S. Representative from WA-07 (2017–present)
- Nancy Pelosi, Speaker of the United States House of Representatives
- Mikie Sherrill, U.S. Representative from New Jersey's 11th congressional district (2019–)

State officials

- Phil Murphy, Governor of New Jersey (2018–present)
- Sheila Oliver, Lieutenant Governor of New Jersey (2018–2023), Commissioner of the New Jersey Department of Community Affairs (2018–2023), former Speaker of the New Jersey General Assembly (2010–2014), former member of the New Jersey General Assembly from the 34th district (2004–2018)

Local officials

- Derek Armstead, mayor of Linden
- Ras Baraka, Mayor of Newark (2014–present)
- Steven Fulop, Mayor of Jersey City (2013–present)
- Ted Green, Mayor of East Orange
- Sean Spiller, mayor of Montclair
- Britnee Timberlake, assembly member from the 34th district
- Tony Vauss, mayor of Irvington
- Dahlia Vertreese, Mayor of Hillside
- Dwayne Warren, mayor of Orange

Labor unions

- Communications Workers of America, labor union representing communication workers
- New Jersey Education Association
- Retail, Wholesale and Department Store Union Local 108

Organizations

- Feminist Majority PAC
- Garden State Equality
- League of Conservation Voters
- Planned Parenthood Action Fund
- Sierra Club

==== Results ====
Democratic primary results
Party	Candidate	Votes	%
Democratic	Donald Payne Jr. (incumbent)	29,680	83.3
Democratic	Imani Oakley	3,764	10.6
Democratic	Akil Khafani	2,169	6.1
Total votes		35,613	100.0

=== Republican primary ===
==== Candidates ====
===== Nominee =====
- David Pinckney, teacher and perennial candidate

===== Eliminated in primary =====
- Garth Stewart

===== Withdrawn =====
- Ana Isabel-Rivera, plumber's apprentice (running in New Jersey's 8th congressional district)

==== Results ====
Republican primary results
Party	Candidate	Votes	%
Republican	David Pinckney	3,581	82.5
Republican	Garth Stewart	760	17.5
Total votes		4,341	100.0

=== General election ===
==== Predictions ====
Source	Ranking	As of
The Cook Political Report	Solid D	June 15, 2022
Inside Elections	Solid D	January 10, 2022
Sabato's Crystal Ball	Safe D	January 4, 2022
Politico	Solid D	April 5, 2022
RCP	Safe D	June 9, 2022
Fox News	Solid D	July 11, 2022
DDHQ	Solid D	July 20, 2022
538	Solid D	June 30, 2022
The Economist	Safe D	September 28, 2022

==== Results ====
2022 New Jersey's 10th congressional district election
Party	Candidate	Votes	%
Democratic	Donald Payne Jr. (incumbent)	100,710	77.6
Republican	David Pinckney	25,993	20.0
Independent	Cynthia Johnson	1,989	1.5
Libertarian	Kendal Ludden	634	0.5
Independent	Clenard J. Childress, Jr.	381	0.3
Total votes		129,707	100.0
Democratic hold			

==== By county ====
County	Donald Payne Jr. Democratic		David Pickney Republican		Various candidates Other parties		Margin		Total votes cast
County	#	%	#	%	#	%	#	%	Total votes cast
Essex (part)	57,229	85.3%	8,287	12.4%	1,570	2.4%	48,942	72.9%	67,086
Hudson (part)	12,350	79.8%	2,658	17.2%	476	3.1%	9,692	62.6%	15,484
Union (part)	30,034	65.6%	14,847	32.4%	911	1.9%	15,187	33.2%	45,792
Totals	100,640	77.6%	25,982	20.0%	3,003	2.3%	74,658	57.6%	129,625

== District 11 ==
2022 New Jersey's 11th congressional district election
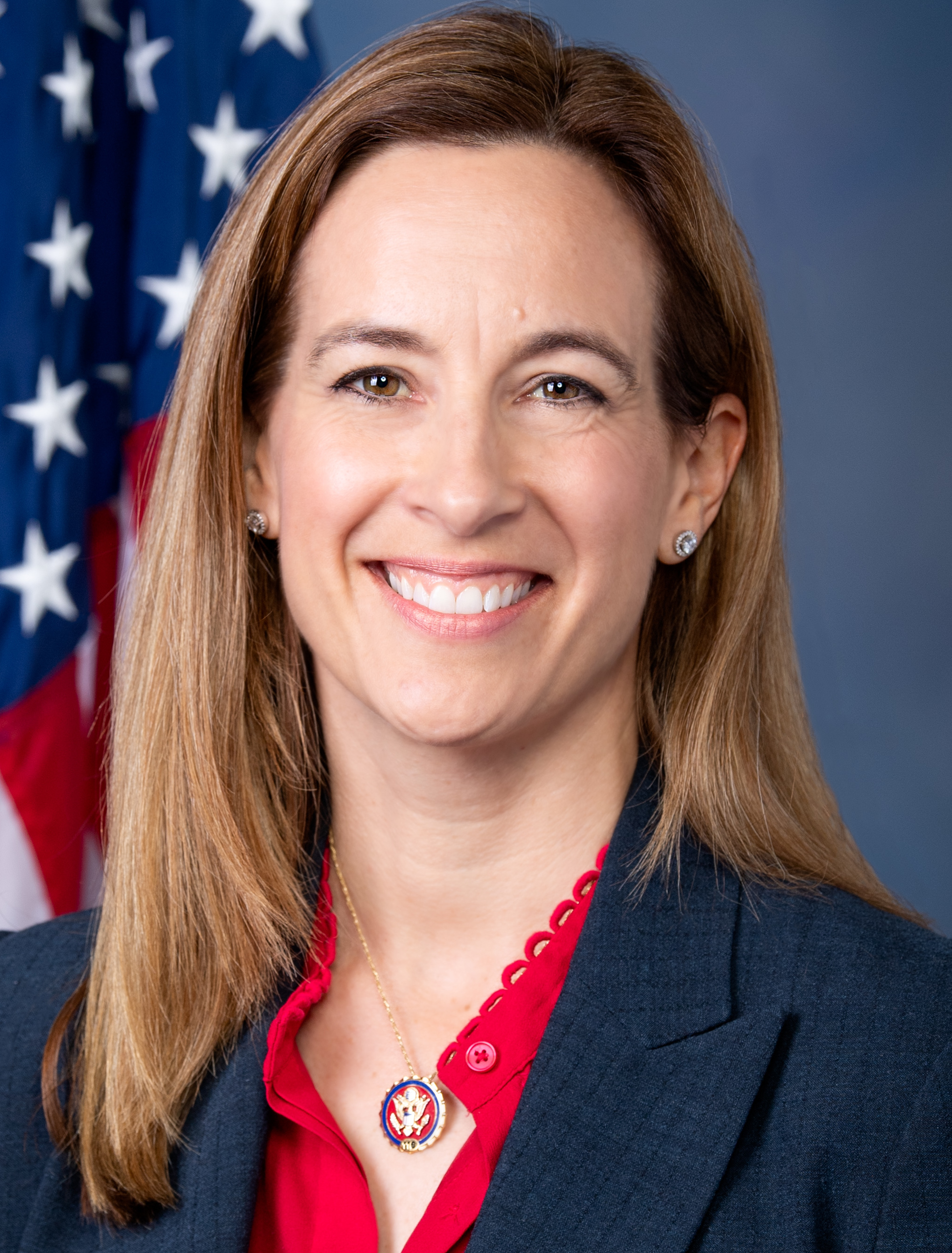

Nominee	Mikie Sherrill	Paul DeGroot
Party	Democratic	Republican
Popular vote	161,436	109,952
Percentage	59.0%	40.2%
- Sherrill: 50–60% 60–70% 70–80% 80–90% 90–100% DeGroot: 40–50% 50–60% 60–70% 70–80%
U.S. Representative before election
Mikie Sherrill
Democratic
Elected U.S. Representative
Mikie Sherrill
Democratic

Democrat Mikie Sherrill, who had represented the district since 2019, was re-elected with 53.3% of the vote in 2020. Sherrill successfully ran for re-election to three terms in office with 59.0% of the vote.

=== Democratic primary ===
==== Candidates ====
===== Nominee =====
- Mikie Sherrill, incumbent U.S. Representative

==== Endorsements ====
Mikie Sherrill

Labor unions

- Communications Workers of America
- International Association of Sheet Metal, Air, Rail and Transportation Workers Transportation Division
- New Jersey Education Association

Organizations

- Feminist Majority PAC
- Garden State Equality
- Giffords
- League of Conservation Voters
- NARAL Pro-Choice America
- Natural Resources Defense Council
- New Politics
- Sierra Club

Newspapers

- The Star-Ledger (post primary)

==== Results ====
Democratic primary results
Party	Candidate	Votes	%
Democratic	Mikie Sherrill (incumbent)	37,948	100.0
Total votes		37,948	100.0

=== Republican primary ===
==== Candidates ====
===== Nominee =====
- Paul DeGroot, Passaic County assistant prosecutor

===== Eliminated in primary =====
- Toby Anderson, businessman
- Alexander Halter
- Ruth McAndrew, registered nurse
- Tayfun Selen, Morris County commissioner

===== Withdrawn =====
- Hillery Brotschol, screenwriter and film producer
- Larry Casha, former Kinnelon council president
- Larry Friscia, attorney (endorsed Casha)
- Robert Ković, attorney and former Ridgefield Park councilmember (endorsed Selen)
- Patrick Quinn III, realtor (running in New Jersey's 9th congressional district)
- Phil Rizzo, pastor and candidate for governor in 2021 (running in New Jersey's 7th congressional district)
- Tom Toomey, businessman (running in New Jersey's 6th congressional district)

===== Declined =====
- Rosemary Becchi, tax attorney, nonprofit executive, and nominee for this seat in 2020
- Anthony Bucco, New Jersey State Senator from the 25th district (2019–present), former New Jersey Assemblymember from the 25th district (2010–2019), former Minority Whip of the New Jersey General Assembly (2016–2017)
- Kristin Corrado, member of the New Jersey Senate from the 40th district (2017–present), former Passaic County Clerk (2010–2017)
- Heather Darling, Morris County Surrogate
- Aura Dunn, New Jersey Assemblymember from the 25th district (2019–2020, 2020–present)

==== Endorsements ====
Toby Anderson

Local officials

- Steven Rogers, former Nutley commissioner

Individuals

- Bob Paduchik, chair of the Ohio Republican Party (2021–), senior advisor for the Donald Trump 2020 presidential campaign, co-chair of the Republican National Committee (2017–2019)
Larry Casha (withdrawn)

State legislators

- Michael Patrick Carroll, former New Jersey Assemblymember from the 25th district (1996–2020)

Local officials

- Virginia Haines, member of the Ocean County Board of County Commissioners (2016–present), Republican National Committee Member (2004-present), former executive director of the New Jersey Lottery (1994–2002), former New Jersey Assemblymember from the 10th district (1992–1994)

Individuals

- Larry Friscia, attorney and former candidate for New Jersey's 11th congressional district
- Bill Palatucci, Republican National Committee Member (2010-present)
Paul DeGroot

County Republican Party organizations

- Passaic County
Robert Ković (withdrawn)

Executive Branch officials

- Michael Flynn, 25th United States National Security Advisor (2017)
- Richard Grenell, former Special Presidential Envoy for Serbia and Kosovo Peace Negotiations, U.S. Ambassador to Germany (2018–2020), and acting Director of National Intelligence (2020)

State legislators

- Edward Durr, New Jersey State Senator from the 3rd district (2022–present)
Tayfun Selen

Individuals

- Robert Ković, attorney, former Ridgefield Park councilmember, and former candidate for New Jersey's 11th congressional district

County Republican Party organizations

- Essex County
- Morris County

==== Polling ====
Hypothetical polling

Poll source	Date(s) administered	Sample size	Margin of error	Rosemary Becchi	Hillery Brotschol
Victory Insights	May 18–19, 2021	199 (LV)	–	88%	12%

==== Results ====
Republican primary results
Party	Candidate	Votes	%
Republican	Paul DeGroot	12,644	39.3
Republican	Tayfun Selen	11,364	35.3
Republican	Toby Anderson	6,385	19.9
Republican	Ruth McAndrew	1,325	4.1
Republican	Alexander Halter	443	1.4
Total votes		32,161	100.0

=== General election ===
==== Debate ====
2022 New Jersey's 11th congressional district debate
No.	Date	Host	Moderator	Link	Democratic	Republican	Libertarian
Key: P Participant A Absent N Not invited I Invited W Withdrawn							
Key: P Participant A Absent N Not invited I Invited W Withdrawn					Mikie Sherrill	Paul DeGroot	Joseph Biasco
1	Oct. 25, 2022	Drew University Center for Civic Engagement; League of Women Voters of New Jersey; Morris County Chamber of Commerce; NAACP Morris County & Montclair branches NJ Hills Media Group	Marlene Cincaglia		P	P	P

==== Predictions ====
Source	Ranking	As of
The Cook Political Report	Solid D	June 15, 2022
Inside Elections	Solid D	January 10, 2022
Sabato's Crystal Ball	Likely D	November 2, 2022
Politico	Likely D	April 5, 2022
RCP	Lean D	September 29, 2022
Fox News	Likely D	July 11, 2022
DDHQ	Solid D	July 20, 2022
538	Solid D	September 29, 2022
The Economist	Safe D	September 28, 2022

==== Polling ====
Hypothetical polling

Mikie Sherrill vs. Rosemary Becchi

Poll source	Date(s) administered	Sample size	Margin of error	Mikie Sherrill (D)	Rosemary Becchi (R)
Victory Insights	May 18–19, 2021	600 (LV)	± 4.2%	51%	49%

Mikie Sherrill vs. Hillery Brotschol

Poll source	Date(s) administered	Sample size	Margin of error	Mikie Sherrill (D)	Hillery Brotschol (R)
Victory Insights	May 18–19, 2021	600 (LV)	± 4.2%	51%	49%

==== Results ====
2022 New Jersey's 11th congressional district election
Party	Candidate	Votes	%
Democratic	Mikie Sherrill (incumbent)	161,436	59.0
Republican	Paul DeGroot	109,952	40.2
Libertarian	Joseph Biasco	2,276	0.8
Total votes		273,664	100.0
Democratic hold			

==== By county ====
County	Mikie Sherrill Democratic		Paul DeGroot Republican		Joseph Biasco Libertarian		Margin		Total votes cast
County	#	%	#	%	#	%	#	%	Total votes cast
Essex (part)	72,132	71.5%	27,893	27.7%	830	0.8%	44,239	43.8%	100,855
Morris (part)	76,257	52.6%	67,488	46.6%	1,218	0.8%	8,769	6.0%	144,963
Passaic (part)	13,047	46.9%	14,571	52.3%	228	0.8%	−1,524	−5.4%	27,846
Totals	161,238	59.0%	109,944	40.2%	2,276	0.8%	51,294	18.8%	273,458

== District 12 ==
2022 New Jersey's 12th congressional district election
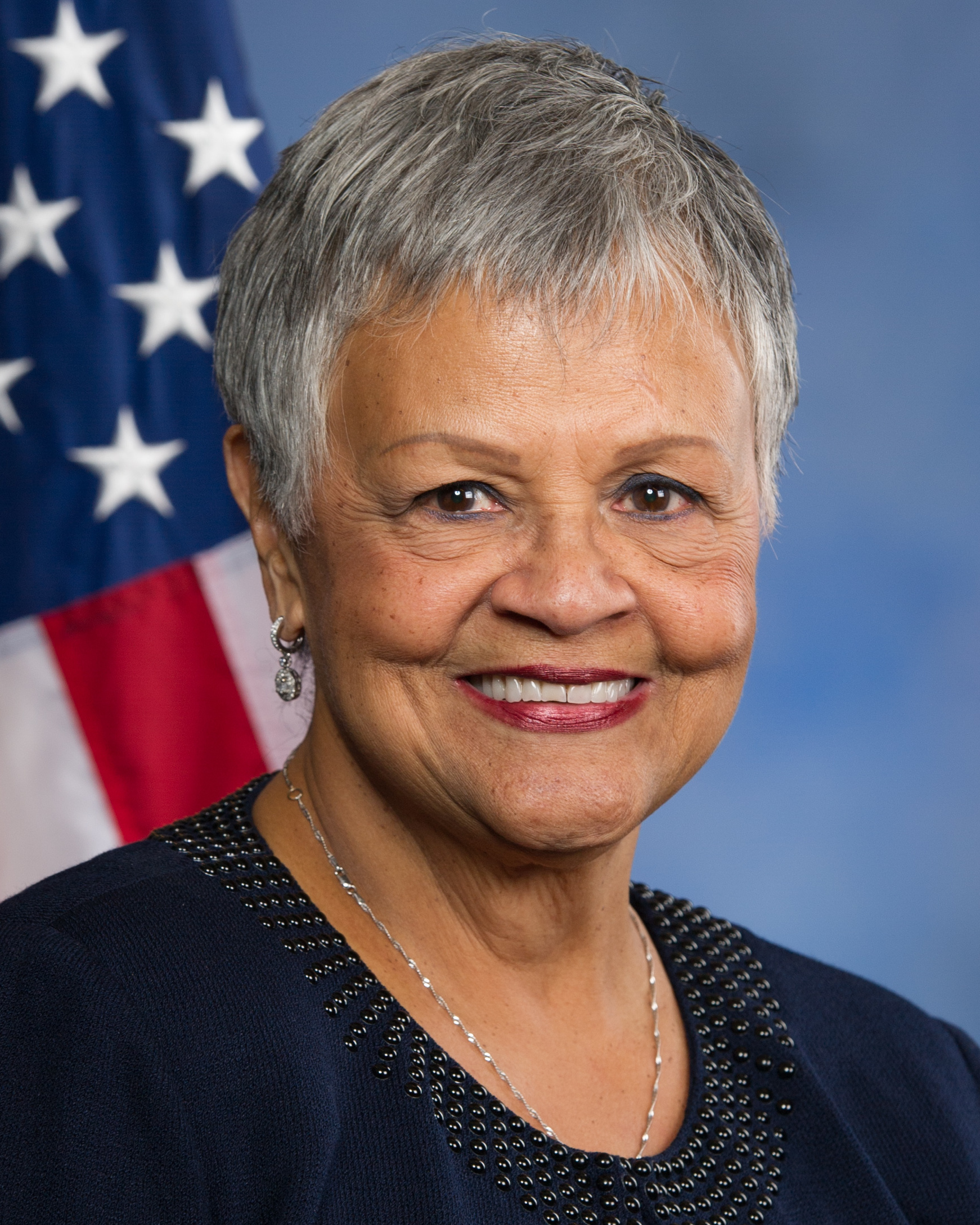

Nominee	Bonnie Watson Coleman	Darius Mayfield
Party	Democratic	Republican
Popular vote	125,127	71,175
Percentage	63.1%	35.9%
- Watson Coleman: 50–60% 60–70% 70–80% 80–90% Mayfield: 40–50% 50–60% 60–70%
U.S. Representative before election
Bonnie Watson Coleman
Democratic
Elected U.S. Representative
Bonnie Watson Coleman
Democratic

Democrat Bonnie Watson Coleman, who had represented the district since 2015, was re-elected with 65.6% of the vote in 2020.

=== Democratic primary ===
==== Candidates ====
===== Nominee =====
- Bonnie Watson Coleman, incumbent U.S. Representative

==== Endorsements ====
Bonnie Watson Coleman

Labor unions

- Communications Workers of America
- New Jersey Education Association

Organizations

- Feminist Majority PAC
- Garden State Equality
- NARAL Pro-Choice America
- Sierra Club

==== Results ====
Democratic primary results
Party	Candidate	Votes	%
Democratic	Bonnie Watson Coleman (incumbent)	37,440	100.0
Total votes		37,440	100.0

=== Republican primary ===
==== Candidates ====
===== Nominee =====
- Darius Mayfield

===== Withdrawn =====
- Nick Catucci, film maker

==== Endorsements ====
Darius Mayfield

U.S. Representatives

- Jeff Van Drew, U.S. Representative from New Jersey's 2nd congressional district (2019–present), former New Jersey State Senator from the 1st district (2008-2018), former New Jersey General Assemblymember from the 1st district (2002-2008), former member of the Cape May County Board of County Commissioners (1995-1998, 2001-2002) (former Democrat)

County Republican Party organizations

- Mercer County
- Somerset County

==== Results ====
Republican primary results
Party	Candidate	Votes	%
Republican	Darius Mayfield	13,514	100.0
Total votes		13,514	100.0

=== General election ===
==== Predictions ====
Source	Ranking	As of
The Cook Political Report	Solid D	June 15, 2022
Inside Elections	Solid D	January 10, 2022
Sabato's Crystal Ball	Safe D	January 4, 2022
Politico	Solid D	April 5, 2022
RCP	Safe D	June 9, 2022
Fox News	Solid D	July 11, 2022
DDHQ	Solid D	July 20, 2022
538	Solid D	June 30, 2022
The Economist	Safe D	September 28, 2022

==== Results ====
2022 New Jersey's 12th congressional district election
Party	Candidate	Votes	%
Democratic	Bonnie Watson Coleman (incumbent)	125,127	63.1
Republican	Darius Mayfield	71,175	35.9
Libertarian	Lynn Genrich	1,925	1.0
Total votes		198,227	100.0
Democratic hold			

==== By county ====
County	Bonnie Watson Coleman Democratic		Darius Mayfield Republican		Lynn Genrich Libertarian		Margin		Total votes cast
County	#	%	#	%	#	%	#	%	Total votes cast
Mercer (part)	34,642	77.0%	9,906	22.0%	454	1.0%	24,736	55.0%	45,002
Middlesex (part)	51,154	55.0%	40,853	44.0%	941	1.0%	10,301	11.0%	92,948
Somerset (part)	32,777	62.0%	19,608	37.1%	445	0.8%	13,169	24.9%	52,830
Union (part)	6,554	88.0%	808	10.9%	85	1.1%	5,746	77.1%	7,447
Totals	125,127	63.1%	71,175	35.9%	1,925	1.0%	52,952	27.2%	198,227

== Notes ==
Partisan clients
