= Khashoggi Ban =

Khashoggi Ban is a sanction and visa restriction announced by the United States Department of State in memory of the Saudi journalist and political dissenter Jamal Khashoggi. It "allows the United States Department of State to impose visa restrictions on individuals who, acting on behalf of a foreign government, are believed to have been directly engaged in serious extraterritorial counter-dissident activities." As of February 2021, it is imposed on 76 Saudi Arabian citizens who are alleged to engaged with the government in counter dissident activities. Family members of such individuals also may be subject to visa restrictions under this policy, where appropriate. The United States Department of State has also been directed to report on any such extraterritorial activities by any government in United States annual Country Reports on Human Rights Practices. The US Department of state also informed that extraterritorial threats and assaults by Saudi Arabia against activists, dissidents, and journalists will not be tolerated.
