= Foreign Affairs Policy Board =

Advisory board concerning US foreign policy

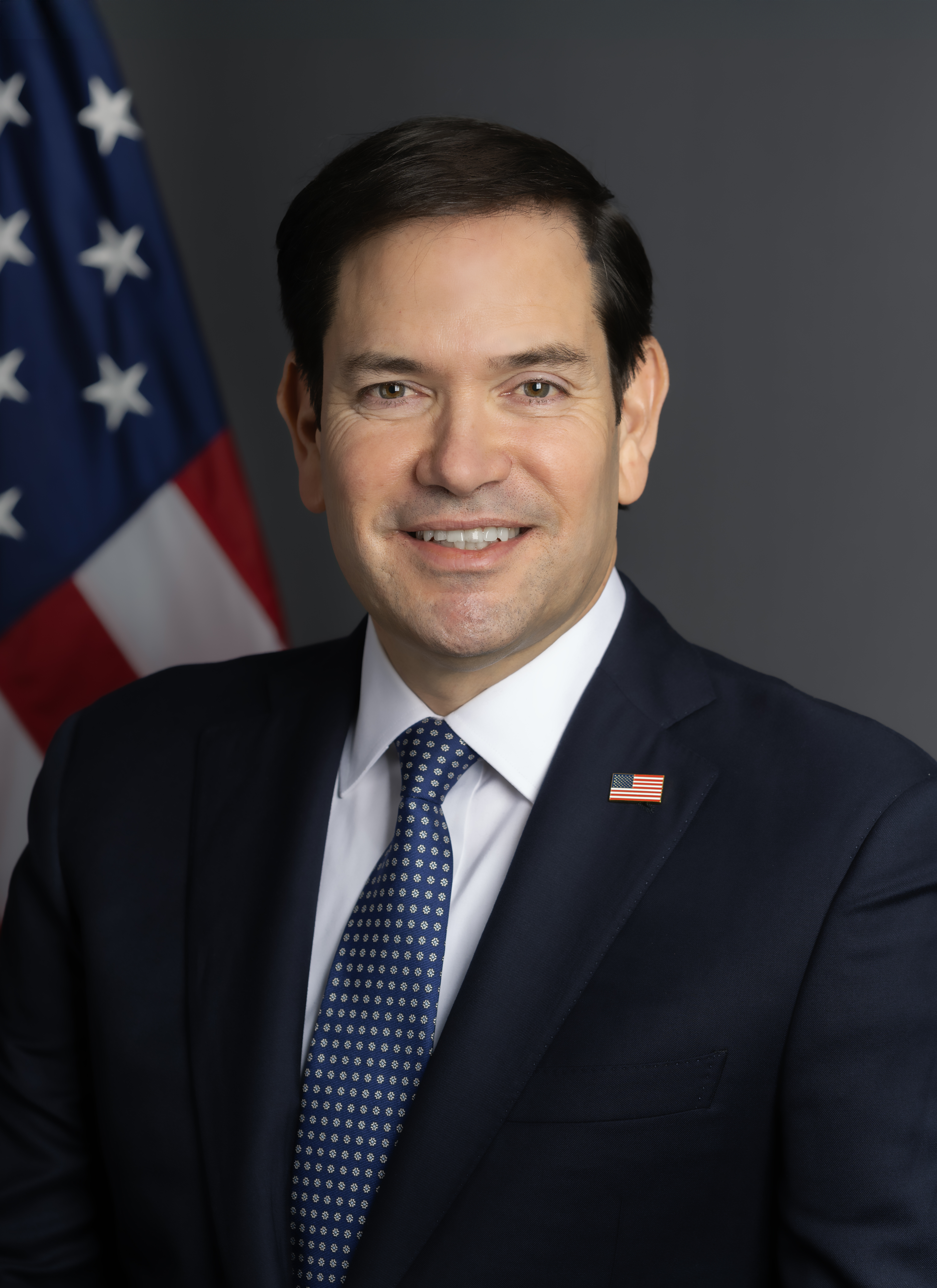
72nd United States Secretary of State Marco Rubio

The Foreign Affairs Policy Board is an advisory board that provides independent advice and opinion to the secretary of state, the deputy secretary of state, and the director of policy planning on matters concerning U.S. foreign policy. The board reviews and assesses global threats and opportunities, trends that implicate core national security interests, tools and capacities of the civilian foreign affairs agencies, and priorities and strategic frameworks for U.S. foreign policy. The board meets in a plenary session several times a year at the U.S. Department of State in the Harry S. Truman Building.

== Career ==
The Foreign Affairs Policy Board was launched in December 2011 under then Secretary Hillary Clinton and modeled after the Defense Policy Board of the U.S. Department of Defense. The board's first meeting was held on December 19, 2011.

== Membership ==
The board is chartered to include 25 members who serve two-year terms. They have a wide range of expertise and come from various backgrounds, including government, academia, politics, development, business, and think tanks.

=== Current members (as of October 2025) ===
- Nicholas Burns
- William J. Burns
- Johnnie Carson
- Stephen A. Cheney
- Nelson W. Cunningham
- Karen Donfried
- Anne M. Finucane
- Stephen J. Hadley
- Jane Harman
- Carla A. Hills
- Jon Huntsman, Jr.
- Robert Kagan
- Daniel C. Kurtzer
- Michael Mullen
- Vali Nasr
- John D. Negroponte
- Joseph S. Nye
- Thomas R. Pickering
- Anne-Marie Slaughter
- Louis B. Susman
- Strobe Talbott
- Thomas J. Vallely
- David Wade

=== Past members ===
The following are past members of the Foreign Affairs Policy Board as of 2019:

- Liaquat Ahamed, author and winner of the Pulitzer Prize for History
- Douglas Beck, vice president, Americas and Northeast Asia for Apple, Inc.
- R. Nicholas Burns, former under secretary of state for political affairs under President George W. Bush
- Johnnie Carson, former Assistant Secretary of State for African Affairs under President Barack Obama
- Stephen A. Cheney, retired brigadier general and CEO of the American Security Project
- Jared Cohen, founder and CEO of Jigsaw at Alphabet Inc. and former member of the Policy Planning Staff under Secretaries of State Condoleezza Rice and Hillary Clinton
- Nelson Cunningham, president and co-founder of McLarty Associates
- Mariano-Florentino Cuéllar, former California Supreme Court justice and president of the Carnegie Endowment for International Peace
- Paula Dobriansky, former under secretary of state for global affairs and President's Envoy to Northern Ireland under President George W. Bush
- Karen Donfried, president of the German Marshall Fund of the United States
- Jim Donovan (banker), managing director at Goldman Sachs
- David Dreier, former member of the U.S. House of Representatives and chairman of the House Rules Committee
- Anne M. Finucane, global chief of strategy and marketing at Bank of America
- Ann Fudge, former chairman and CEO of Young & Rubicam Brands
- Helene Gayle, former president and CEO of CARE
- Stephen J. Hadley, former National Security Advisor under President George W. Bush
- Cecil D. Haney, 4-star admiral (retired), United States Navy and former STRATCOM commander
- Jane Harman, president of the Woodrow Wilson International Center for Scholars
- Carla A. Hills, co-chair of the Council on Foreign Relations and former U.S. Trade Representative under President George H. W. Bush
- Alberto Ibargüen, president and CEO of the John S. and James L. Knight Foundation
- Robert Kagan, senior fellow in foreign policy at the Brookings Institution
- William Kennard, former U.S. ambassador to the European Union
- Robert Kimmitt, former U.S. ambassador to Germany, former deputy secretary of the treasury and under secretary of state for political affairs under President George H. W. Bush
- Jim Kolbe, former member of the U.S. House of Representatives
- Stephen Krasner, former director of policy planning under President George W. Bush
- Daniel C. Kurtzer, professor of Middle East studies at Princeton University and former U.S. ambassador to Israel and Egypt
- Mack McLarty, former White House chief of staff under President Bill Clinton
- Michael Mullen, retired United States Navy admiral and former chairman of the Joint Chiefs of Staff under presidents George W. Bush and Barack Obama
- Vali Nasr, dean of the Paul H. Nitze School of Advanced International Studies and senior fellow in foreign policy at the Brookings Institution
- John D. Negroponte, former deputy secretary of state and the first director of national intelligence
- Jacqueline Novogratz, founder and CEO of Acumen
- Joseph S. Nye, political scientist and professor at Harvard University
- Thomas R. Pickering, former under secretary of state for political affairs and former U.S. ambassador to the United Nations
- John Podesta, former White House chief of staff under President Bill Clinton and counselor to President Barack Obama
- William Roedy, former chairman and CEO of MTV Networks International
- Susan Schwab, former United States Trade Representative under President George W. Bush
- Anne-Marie Slaughter, president and CEO of New America and former director of policy planning under Secretary Hillary Clinton
- Clifford Sobel, former U.S. ambassador to the Netherlands and U.S. ambassador to Brazil under President George W. Bush
- James Steinberg, former United States deputy secretary of state
- Louis B. Susman, former U.S. ambassador to the United Kingdom under President Barack Obama
- Strobe Talbott, president of the Brookings Institution and former deputy secretary of state under President Bill Clinton
- Laura Tyson, former director of the National Economic Council and the chair of the Council of Economic Advisers under President Bill Clinton
- Thomas J. Vallely, senior advisor for Mainland Southeast Asia at the Ash Center for Democratic Governance and Innovation
- Richard Verma, former U.S. ambassador to India
- Charles David Welch, former U.S. ambassador to Egypt and assistant secretary of state for Near Eastern affairs under President George W. Bush
- Christine Todd Whitman, former administrator of the Environmental Protection Agency under President George W. Bush and the 50th governor of New Jersey
