= Sarvesh Shashi =

Indian Yogi & Entrepreneur

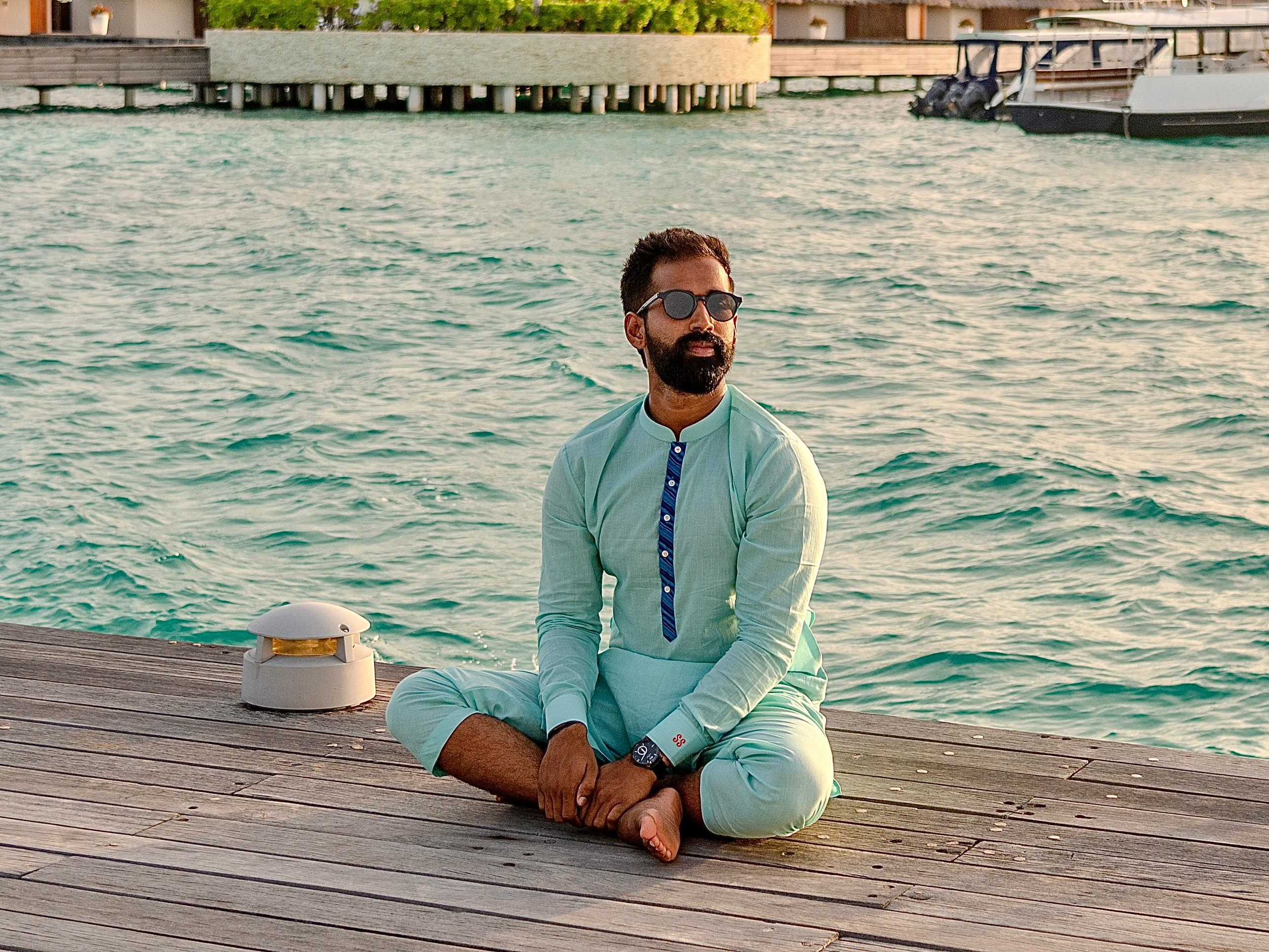
- Sarvesh in 2024
- Born: Sarvesh Shashi; 15 April 1992 (age 34); Thrissur, Kerala
- Occupations: Entrepreneur, yogi
- Years active: 2013–present
- Known for: Yogi
- Website: sarveshshashi.com

Sarvesh Shashi (born, 15 April 1992), known as "Modern Yogi", is an Indian yoga practitioner and author. He is the founder of "SARVA", a Yoga studio chain and Health platform in India.

== Early life ==
Sarvesh was born in hrissur, Kerala to his father, Shashi Kumar is the chairman of the Chennai-based conglomerate, Sabari Group. He was introduced to yoga by his parents at age six, Sarvesh later attended Loyola College in Chennai before leaving to join the family business. He was in the Tamil Nadu junior cricket team. Sarvesh later served as a net bowler for Kochi Tuskers Kerala in 2011 and for Rajasthan Royals in 2012 & 2013 during the Indian Premier League (IPL).

== Career ==
In 2013, at the age of 23, he founded Zorba, a yoga studio, in a vacant warehouse owned by his father. Three years later, Talwalkars, a fitness chain, acquired a 50% stake in Zorba for $2 million, leading to a partnership that introduced yoga classes into their gyms nationwide. In 2018, Zorba was rebranded as "SARVA", with over 80 studios over India and International. That same year, he co-founded "Diva Yoga" with Malaika Arora, a consumer health platform and a yoga program with dedicated space exclusively for women. In 2019, Diva Yoga launched in Chennai. It is currently located in Mumbai and Chennai.

In 2019, He received funding from investors including Jennifer Lopez, Zumba Fitness, Alexx Rodriguez, Malaika Arora, Bill Roedy for his yoga studio "SARVA". The same year, He was featured in Fortune 40 Under 40 in India and in GQ India as Most Influential Young Indians in 2019.

In 2020, Shashi was featured in Forbes 30 Under 30 Asia for Healthcare & Science. He was also featured in Entrepreneur 30 Under 30.

In 2024, Shashi wrote and published the book How To Fall in Love with Yoga: Move. Breathe. Connect. with a foreword by Malaika Arora. The book explores various yoga poses and flows, and emphasizes the integration of mindfulness and yoga principles into everyday life.

In 2024, he founded "ABCStudios", a talent management company across entertainment, music, and sports with a focus on the South Indian market. They also produce content for ads and films.

== Awards and recognition ==
Year	Organization	Title	Ref
2020	Forbes	30 Under 30 Asia for Healthcare & Science	
2019	Fortune	40 Under 40	
2019	GQ India	Most Influential Young Indians	
	Bloomberg	Youngest CEO in the Health and Wellness Sector	
2020	Entrepreneur India	30 Under 30	
2021	Businessworld	30 Under 30	
