= Global Media =

Global Media may refer to:

- Global Media Group (formerly Controlinveste), a Portuguese media holding company founded by Portuguese sports mogul and FC Porto S.A.D.'s shareholder Joaquim Oliveira
- Global Media & Entertainment, a British media company founded by Ashley Tabor-King

== See also ==
- Global Media AIDS Initiative, an umbrella organization that unites and motivates media companies around the world to use their influence, resources, and creative talent to address AIDS
- Global Media Arts (known as GMA Network), a media company based in Diliman, Quezon County, Philippines
- Global Media and Communication, a triannual peer-reviewed academic journal covering the field of communication studies
- The Global Media Monitoring Project, an international study of gender in the news media
