= Richard Sambrook =

British journalist

- Born: 1956 (age 69–70); Canterbury, Kent
- Occupations: Emeritus Professor in the School of Journalism, Media and Culture at Cardiff University, and Chair, The Bureau of Investigative Journalism
- Known for: Ex-Director of BBC News and BBC World Service

Richard Sambrook is a British journalist, academic and a former BBC executive. He is emeritus professor in the School of Journalism, Media and Culture at Cardiff University. For 30 years, until February 2010, he was a BBC journalist and later, a news executive.

== Early life and BBC career ==
Sambrook was educated at Maidstone Technical High School, the University of Reading (BA in English) and Birkbeck College, University of London (MSc in politics). His career began in local newspapers in South Wales.

His 30 years at the BBC were almost entirely in the news. He was successively a programme editor, news editor and head of newsgathering when the corporation won many awards for its international news coverage. He merged radio and television newsgathering teams and domestic and World Service newsgathering during this time, resulting in the world's largest broadcast news operation. He was acting director of sport in 2000, and became director of news in 2001.

Sambrook defended in June/July 2003 what became the highly controversial Today programme report that the Blair government had in its September Dossier knowingly exaggerated claims relating to Iraq's supposed possession of weapons of mass destruction. On 20 July, he confirmed that Dr. David Kelly had been the source of the news item. He later gave evidence to the Hutton Inquiry into Kelly's apparent suicide.

He spent ten years on the management board of the BBC becoming successively director of BBC Sport, director of BBC News and finally, from September 2004, director of the World Service and Global News. He oversaw major restructuring of the World Service, and its opening of Arabic and Persian television, as well as commercial interactive services. He is a frequent contributor to radio and TV coverage of media issues and writes regularly for The Conversation (website).

== Other and subsequent roles ==
From 2010 until 2012, he was global vice chairman and chief content officer of the Edelman public relations agency. From January 2010 until 2017, he was a visiting research fellow at the Reuters Institute for the Study of Journalism at the University of Oxford and from 2012 until 2021 a professor of journalism at Cardiff University. He devised and launched one of the first degree courses in computational journalism in partnership with the computer science department at Cardiff. He has published several books and research papers on journalism including on international news, the future of TV News and the role of impartiality in digital news. In 2020 the BBC commissioned him to review staff use of social media and in 2025 he was asked to join a board level review of the BBC’s editorial standards and compliance following the resignation of the Director General and then Head of News over allegations of bias.

His non-executive roles have largely supported free speech and independent journalism. He is currently co-chair of The Bureau of Investigative Journalism.

From 2012 until 2018 he led the International News Safety Institute, for which he chaired an inquiry into the deaths of journalists around the world. From 2006 to 2009, he was vice president of the European Broadcasting Union and represented public broadcasters on the advisory group to the UN's Internet Governance Forum. He was a trustee of the free-speech NGO Article 19 for six years and was a member of the leadership committee of the Global Media AIDS Initiative, established by UN Secretary General Kofi Annan in 2004. He was on the advisory board of the British Council and was formerly Chairman of the BBC's international charity, the World Service Trust (now BBC Media Action). He was a trustee of the WWF-UK from 2010 to 2016. He is a Fellow of the Royal Television Society and of the Royal Society of Arts.

== Personal life ==
Sambrook is married with two children.

== Publications ==
- Sambrook, Richard (2018). Global Teamwork: The Rise of Collaboration in Investigative Journalism. Oxford: Oxford University. ISBN 978-1-907384-35-6.
- Cushion, Stephen; Sambrook, Richard (2016). The Future of 24 Hour News. New York: Peter Lang. ISBN 978-1-4539-1816-6.
- Cottle, Simon; Sambrook, Richard; Mosdell, Nick (2016). Reporting Dangerously: journalist killings, intimidation and security. London: Palgrave Macmillan. ISBN 978-1-137-40669-9.
- Sambrook, Richard (2010). Are Foreign Correspondents Redundant? The Changing Face of International News. Oxford: Oxford University. ISBN 978-1-907384-00-4.
