= AJX (disambiguation) =

AJX is the ICAO code for Air Japan.

AJX may also refer to:

- AJX Bridge over South Fork and Powder River, Johnson County, Wyoming, US; an NRHP-listed truss bridge for US 87
- Alexium International (stock ticker AJX), Australian materials company
- AgJunction Inc. (stock ticker AJX); see Companies listed on the Toronto Stock Exchange (A)
- AFC Ajax (abbreviated AJX), a football club in Amsterdam, Netherlands

== See also ==
- AJ10
- Ajax (disambiguation)
