= Stephen A. Cheney =

- Military career
- Allegiance: United States of America
- Branch: United States Marine Corps
- Service years: 1971–2001
- Rank: Brigadier General
- Commands: Marine Corps Recruit Depot Parris Island
- Awards: Distinguished Service Medal; Defense Superior Service Medal; Legion of Merit (2); Defense Meritorious Service Medal; Meritorious Service Medal; Navy and Marine Corps Commendation Medal (3); Army Commendation Medal

Stephen A. Cheney is a retired United States Marine Corps Brigadier General who served for more than 30 years. He is a graduate of the United States Naval Academy, and held command positions at the Marine Corps Recruit Depots in San Diego and Parris Island, where he was Commanding General. He also served as Inspector General of the Marine Corps from 1997 to 1999, during which time he was also Deputy Inspector General for the Department of the Navy. He retired from active duty in 2001. Cheney is on the American Security Project's board of directors, where he previously was CEO.

== Early life and education ==
Cheney was part of the first graduating class of T.C. Williams High School in Alexandria, Virginia. He was the school's first athletic All-American, winning the distinction for breast stroke events at both the East Coast High School Championships in Princeton, New Jersey, and the Southeastern U.S. High School Championships in Chapel Hill, North Carolina, in 1967. Declining scholarships from Stanford, Cornell, and Bucknell, he chose to accept a Presidential appointment to the U.S. Naval Academy in Annapolis, Md. Swimming on the varsity team all four years, he was recognized as Freshman Swimmer of the Year in 1968, and competed at the 1969 NCAA Championships in Indianapolis, Indiana. After graduating with a B.S. degree in Marine Engineering in 1971, he was commissioned a Second Lieutenant in the U.S. Marine Corps. He completed training at Fort Sill Artillery Basic (1972) and Advanced (1979) Courses. He received his M.S. in Systems Management from the University of Southern California (1978), and is also a graduate of the Marine Corps Command and Staff College (1985) and the National War College (1990).

== Military service ==
Cheney became a Field Artillery Officer in 1971. He served with the First Marine Division, the III Marine Expeditionary Force, and the 1st Marine Aircraft Wing in command and staff positions. At the Marine Corps Recruit Depot San Diego he had command positions of series and company from 1975 to 1978. Subsequent tours were: Company Grade and Majors' Monitor, Headquarters Marine Corps, Washington, D.C. (1979–1983); Force Artillery Officer and G-1A, III Marine Amphibious Force, Okinawa (1984–1985); Executive Officer, 3d Battalion, 11th Marine Regiment (1985–1987); and Commanding Officer, Support Battalion, MCRD, San Diego (1987–1989).

After graduating from the National War College, Cheney was the Ground Plans Officer for the Department of Defense Coordinator for Drug Enforcement Policy and Support. From 1991 to 1993, he served as Deputy Executive Secretary under Secretaries of Defense Dick Cheney and Les Aspin. As a Colonel, he won a military fellowship at the Council on Foreign Relations, of which he remains a member. In 1998 he published an article in the Council on Foreign Relations journal Foreign Affairs. He held staff assignments at the Marine Corps's Manpower Department and Operations Department in Washington, DC, where he was a liaison to the Commission on Roles and Missions from 1994 to 1995. In 1995 he returned to Marine Corps Recruit Depot San Diego, where he commanded the Recruit Training Regiment. After being promoted to Brigadier General, he took office as Inspector General of the Marine Corps in 1997. He became Commanding General of Marine Corps Recruit Depot Parris Island in 1999. At Parris Island, he oversaw improvements in the basic training regimen that led to a reduction in injuries and an increase in graduation rate, which reduced pressure on overworked Marine recruiters and helped the Corps to be the only service to meet recruitment goals. He retired from active duty on August 1, 2001.

== Post service life ==
From 2003 until 2006, Cheney was the Chief Operating Officer for Business Executives for National Security, in Washington, D.C. In 2006, he joined the board of directors of the American Security Project. He was President of the Marine Military Academy in Harlingen, Texas from 2006 until 2011. He was on the board of directors for the Valley International Airport in Harlingen, Texas. He is an honorary fellow at the Foreign Policy Association.

Cheney was awarded the Central Intelligence Agency Agency Seal Medal in 2004 for significant contributions to the Agency's intelligence efforts.

Cheney became the chief executive officer of the American Security Project in Washington, DC in August 2011 and later was named president. He was also president of the American Security Action Fund. He retired from ASP in 2021 and was named President Emeritus.

In December 2013, Cheney was appointed to the Secretary of State's International Security Advisory Board. Secretary of State John Kerry appointed Cheney to the Foreign Affairs Policy Board in October 2014. He resigned from both in 2017.

In 2015, The Weather Channel named him as a member of the Climate 25 in recognition of his leadership in understanding climate change as a threat to national security.

In April 2015, Cheney accepted a position as a Non-Executive Director of Alexium International, which is based in Greenville, South Carolina. He retired from Alexium in October 2023, and became an advisory board member for Workstorm LLC in Chicago at that time.

Cheney remains active in U.S. Masters Swimming and was 3rd in age group at the mile in the 2022 National Championships.
