= Kristen Silverberg =

American diplomat

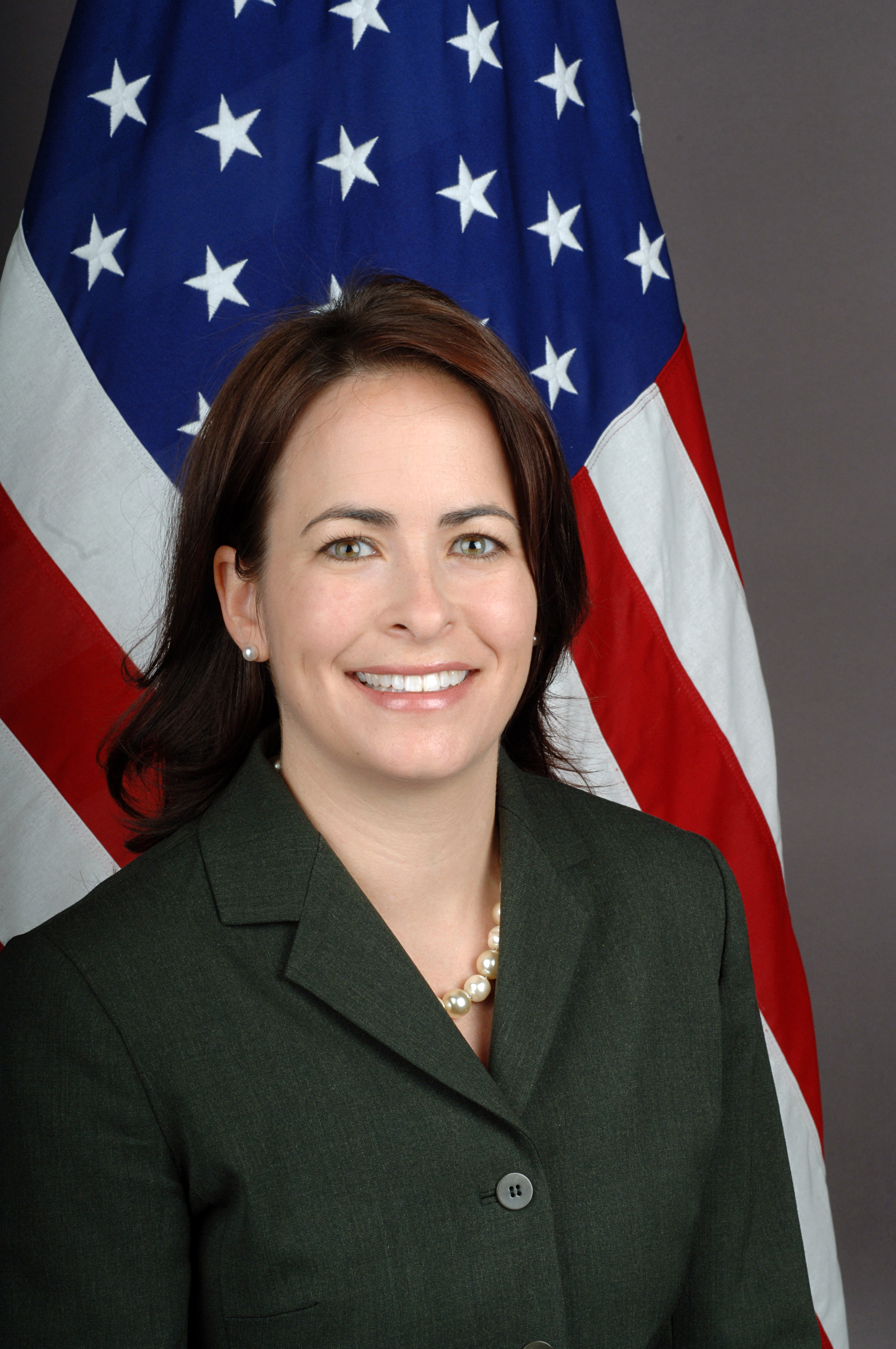
- Official Portrait, 2005

United States Ambassador to the European Union
- In office July 22, 2008 – January 18, 2009
- President: George W. Bush
- Preceded by: C. Boyden Gray
- Succeeded by: William Kennard

23rd Assistant Secretary of State for International Organization Affairs
- In office August 16, 2005 – June 27, 2008
- President: George W. Bush
- Preceded by: Kim Holmes
- Succeeded by: Brian H. Hook

Personal details
- Born: 1970 (age 55–56) Alpine, Texas, U.S.
- Education: Harvard University (BA); University of Texas at Austin (JD)

Kristen Silverberg (born 1970) was the United States ambassador to the European Union from July 2008 until January 2009. She was nominated by President George W. Bush on April 24, 2008, and confirmed by the United States Senate on June 27, 2008. On July 22, 2008, she presented her credentials. She was succeeded by William Kennard who was nominated by President Barack Obama on August 6, 2009, and confirmed by the United States Senate on November 20, 2009.

== Career ==
Silverberg was previously Assistant Secretary of State for International Organization Affairs for the United States government. In that role, she was in charge of the Bureau of International Organization Affairs, a part of the State Department.

Prior to her appointment to the State Department, Silverberg served in the following positions in the White House:

- Special Assistant to the President in the Office of the Chief of Staff
- Deputy Assistant to the President for Domestic Policy
- Deputy Assistant to the President and Advisor to the Chief of Staff

Silverberg also served as Senior Adviser to Paul Bremer when he was Administrator of the Coalition Provisional Authority in Iraq—reportedly "because she was interested in the work, and not at the behest of the White House." She has been described as a "rising star" in the White House, and as "one of the White House's most trusted behind-the-scenes aides."

Prior to coming to work for the White House, Silverberg served as a law clerk, first to Appellate Court Judge David B. Sentelle, and later to Supreme Court Justice Clarence Thomas.

She sat on the advisory board for Washington, DC nonprofit America Abroad Media until 2018.

== Personal life ==
Silverberg was born in 1970 in Alpine, Texas to Rhoda and Eric Silverberg. Silverberg is a graduate of Harvard University and The University of Texas School of Law (1996). She wrote an article (PDF) in 2002 encouraging fellow alumni to seek legal careers in government.

On May 24, 2008, she married Paul V. Lettow at the Lady Bird Johnson Wildflower Center in Austin, Texas; Lettow is the son of Charles F. Lettow, who since July 2003 has been a judge of the U.S. Court of Federal Claims.

== See also ==
- List of law clerks for the tenth seat of the Supreme Court of the United States

Diplomatic posts
Preceded by C. Boyden Gray	United States Ambassador to the European Union; 2008–2009	Succeeded by William Kennard
Government offices
Preceded by Kim R. Holmes	Assistant Secretary of State for International Organization Affairs; 2005–2008	Succeeded by Brian H. Hook
