= Mack McLarty =

American politician

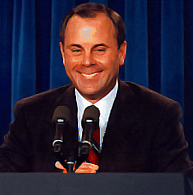

Counselor to the President
- In office July 17, 1994 – June 30, 1998
- President: Bill Clinton
- Preceded by: David Gergen
- Succeeded by: Paul Begala

17th White House Chief of Staff
- In office January 20, 1993 – July 17, 1994
- President: Bill Clinton
- Preceded by: James Baker
- Succeeded by: Leon Panetta

Chair of the Democratic Party of Arkansas
- In office 1974–1976
- Succeeded by: Herby Branscum Jr.

Member of the Arkansas House of Representatives from the 34th district
- In office 1971–1973
- Preceded by: Talbot Feild Jr.
- Succeeded by: John Hoffman

Personal details
- Born: Thomas Franklin McLarty III; June 14, 1946 (age 80) Hope, Arkansas, U.S.
- Party: Democratic
- Education: University of Arkansas (BBA)

Thomas Franklin "Mack" McLarty, III (born June 14, 1946) is an American business and political leader who served as President Bill Clinton's first White House chief of staff from 1993 to June 1994, and subsequently as counselor to the president and special envoy for the Americas, before leaving government service in June 1998.

Previously, he was chairman and CEO of Arkla, Inc. (1983–1992), a natural gas company. During that time, he was appointed by President George H.W. Bush to the National Petroleum Council and the National Council on Environmental Quality, and served on the St. Louis Federal Reserve Board.

He is currently the chairman of McLarty Associates, an international strategic advisory firm headquartered in Washington, DC, and chairman of the McLarty Companies, based in Little Rock, Arkansas.

== Early life ==
McLarty was born in Hope, Arkansas, the son of Helen (née Hesterly) and Thomas F. McLarty, Jr. His father owned and operated an automotive dealership founded by his grandfather in 1921. His mother was "the first woman named to the Arkansas Industrial Development Commission".

An all-star high school athlete and football quarterback, McLarty also served as president of the Hope High School student council. In 1963, he attended Arkansas Boys State, where he was elected governor—the same year his childhood friend Bill Clinton was elected Senator.

McLarty attended the University of Arkansas, where he was elected Student Body President. He graduated summa cum laude in 1968, with a degree in business administration. While at the University of Arkansas, he met classmate and fellow business student Donna Kaye Cochran. They were married in 1968 and returned to Hope, where Mack joined his father in the family business.

== Business career ==
At the age of 23, McLarty ran successfully for the Arkansas House of Representatives, serving one term (1971–73) under Governor Dale Bumpers. He then concentrated his efforts on growing the McLarty family's truck leasing business, first called M&M Leasing, and later McLarty Leasing.

McLarty played leading roles in politics, business and the community. Amongst other roles, he was president of Hempstead County Industrial Foundation, a member of the Democratic National Committee (1974–76) and the chairman of the State Democratic Party. He acted as treasurer in the successful campaigns of Governor David Pryor and President Bill Clinton. McLarty also helped create the IMPAC program, which worked to mobilize private sector support for putting personal computers in Arkansas classrooms.

McLarty was named the youngest board member of the Fortune 500 natural gas company Arkla, Inc., becoming its chief executive officer in 1983.

== White House years ==
Following Bill Clinton's 1992 election victory, McLarty helped lead the transition team, and then entered public service as a member of the Clinton administration, serving as the president's first White House Chief of Staff from 1993 to June 1994. McLarty is a lifelong friend of Clinton's, having attended the same kindergarten class in Hope, Arkansas.

In the first year of the Clinton presidency, McLarty and his team helped to put in place President Clinton's deficit reduction plan; set up the first National Economic Council; passed the Family and Medical Leave law; passed NAFTA and facilitated the passage and signing of the Brady Bill.

McLarty went on to serve as counselor to the president, serving more than five years in the President's Cabinet and on the National Economic Council. In this role, he served as White House Coordinator for the Centennial Games in Atlanta. He also organized the 1994 Summit of the Americas in Miami, which ultimately led to his December 1996 appointment as Special Envoy for the Americas. In recognition of his work, McLarty was awarded the Secretary of State's Distinguished Service Medal and the highest civilian honors of seven Latin American countries.

McLarty left the Clinton administration in June 1998.

== McLarty Associates ==
After leaving government, he founded an international strategic advisory firm, in partnership with fellow White House alumnus Nelson Cunningham, and later Henry Kissinger.

McLarty Associates, based in Washington D.C., is a global team of former ambassadors and senior foreign policy experts, journalists, and business leaders, with expertise in all the world's major markets. After eight years with McLarty Associates, Kissinger left as a principal from McLarty Associates on February 21, 2008, but remained with the firm on the board of counsellors.

== McLarty companies ==
The McLarty Companies comprises 11 automotive dealerships located in five states that generate in excess of $600 million. McLarty returned as the chairman of the McLarty Companies after leaving the White House in 1998.

In 2007, the company formed a partnership with Robert L. Johnson, founder of Black Entertainment Television. Jim Press, former president of Toyota North America, serves as president of RML Automotive. As of October 2017, RML consists of 47 automotive franchises across the South Central, Southeast, and Midwest regions of the United States. It was ranked 25th on the 2017 Automotive News annual list of "Top 125 Dealerships in the U.S."

== Current affiliations ==
- Americas Society/Council of the Americas – Member of the board
- Center for Strategic and International Studies – Advisor
- Inter-American Dialogue – Co-vice chair, board of directors
- Union Pacific – Member, board of directors
- University of Arkansas – Member, board of advisors
- United States Chamber of Commerce – Senior International Fellow
- Energy Futures Initiative – Member, advisory board
- Partnership for Public Service Center for Presidential Transition – Member, advisory board
- Council on Foreign Relations – Member (since 2001)

== See also ==
- Kissinger Associates

Political offices
| Preceded by James Baker | White House Chief of Staff; 1993–1994 | Succeeded by Leon Panetta |
