= Ann M. Fudge =

American businesswoman

Ann Fudge
- Born: Ann Marie Brown; April 23, 1951 (age 75); Washington, D.C., U.S.
- Education: Simmons College, Massachusetts (BA); Harvard University (MBA)
- Political party: Democratic
- Spouse: Rich Fudge

Ann Marie Fudge (born Ann Marie Brown on April 23, 1951) is an American businesswoman who is on a number of corporate boards, including those of General Electric, Novartis, Unilever and Infosys, as well as on several non-profit boards. She is former chair and CEO of Young & Rubicam Brands, a global network of marketing communications companies. In 2010, Fudge was on President Barack Obama's National Commission on Fiscal Responsibility and Reform.

== Early life and education ==
Fudge was born and raised in Washington, D.C., and attended the city's Catholic schools through 12th grade. She cited the riots she lived through after the assassination of the Rev. Dr. Martin Luther King Jr. as a 'hurtful' but formative experience. 'They made me incredibly determined,' she said. 'I wanted to do something that black people hadn't done before. When I hit roadblocks, that was what kept me going.' ... She grew up middle class in Washington, the first of two children born to a mother who was a manager at the National Security Agency and a father who was an administrator at the Postal Service. They stressed education ... and [Fudge also] credits the nuns for pushing her to do her best."

Fudge is a graduate of Simmons College and Harvard Business School, earning respectively BA (honors) in retail management, 1973; and MBA, 1977. In 1998, HBS Prof. Stephen A. Greyser recalled Fudge as "a solid citizen, a solid student."

Discussing her educational choices with Business Week in 2004, she said, "When I was at Simmons College, I had this great professor – Margaret Hennig. She was the one who encouraged me to think about business and apply to Harvard Business School. She and Ann Jardim wrote the first book on women in business, called The Managerial Woman, and founded the Simmons Graduate School of Business. I applied to Harvard Business School my senior year."

== Career ==
One job Fudge had while still in high school was with the Teen Board at Hecht's department store. The job included advising on teen-age fashions and a trip to fashion magazines in New York. After college, Fudge worked in the human resources department of the General Electric Company before pursuing her MBA.

After Harvard, Fudge spent nine years at General Mills. "Her biggest accomplishment there, she said, was her part as a marketing assistant on the team that developed Honey Nut Cheerios. Today, it's one of the nation's biggest cereal brands." Fudge then ultimately was president of the beverages, desserts and post division, a $5 billion unit of Kraft Foods. At Kraft, she was on the management committee and managed businesses including Maxwell House coffee, Gevalia kaffe, Kool-Aid, Crystal Light, Post Cereals, Jell-O desserts, and Altoids.

In 1998, Fudge was named by Fortune magazine as 30th on the 50 Most Influential Women in American Business list (Carly Fiorina No. 1 Oprah Winfrey #2), while she was executive vice president at Kraft. At the time, coffee and cereals for which Fudge was responsible accounted for $2.7 billion (16%) of Kraft's $16.8 billion in sales. She also at the time sat on the boards of AlliedSignal, Liz Claiborne, (both as of 1993) and Catalyst, Inc.

In 2001, after a year as president of the beverages et al. division at Kraft, "Fudge decided to retire. She related to Business Week that her choice to leave Kraft was based on a number of reasons. She had had a goal of retiring before age 50; she had dealt with the recent illness and death of her parents, some close friends and relatives. 'To be honest, I still haven't figured it out. ... It was definitely not dissatisfaction. It was stepping back and saying, "What are you really here for? What do you really want to accomplish?"' She spent two years reconnecting with friends and family and delving into community work. Her charitable work included work with a number of organizations, including the Executive Leadership Council, a non-profit group of high-level African-American leaders in business, the Boys & Girls Clubs of America, Partnership for a Drug-Free America, and the United Way, among others. From her time away, Fudge became inspired by the power individuals have to make a difference in the world."

Following the sabbatical, Fudge was chair and chief executive officer of Young & Rubicam Brands from 2003 to 2007. In 2004, Business Week summed up some of the challenges facing her, saying Y&R "has suffered through poor management and a messy merger in recent years. The various units tend to work in isolation. The ad agency has lost some big clients. And employees are disgruntled ... [including] reports of animosity between Fudge and creative head Michael Patti."

Fudge was Inside the Boardroom guest, 2008, Carlson School of Management at the University of Minnesota.

In February 2011, Fudge was featured by the Commonwealth Institute in Miami, Florida, and in April 2011, Fudge spoke at the Economic Club of Minnesota.

In 2011, Fudge was on the boards of directors of General Electric, Novartis, and Unilever. She was chair of the U.S. Programs Advisory Board of The Gates Foundation; and she was a trustee of the Rockefeller Foundation, Brookings Institution, the Council on Foreign Relations and Morehouse College. She has been a Morehouse trustee since April 2006. She also was on the board of Buzzient, Inc, and was vice chair of the Harvard Board of Overseers.

In June 2011, it was announced that Fudge would join the board of Indian technology and outsourcing company Infosys on October 1, 2011, as an Additional Director. Fudge was at the time the sole woman on the board, and was recruited by retiring founder NR Narayana Murthy and nominations committee chair Jeffrey S. Lehman. Murthy had also been on the Unilever board and knew Fudge from there.

In September 2011, Fudge was one of six Hall of Fame honorees named in advance of the National Association of Corporate Directors November gala in New York City.

=== Political involvement and public service ===
In 2008, Fudge was a member of the Obama presidential campaign’s finance committee.

In early 2010, Fudge was named by President Obama to the 18-member National Commission on Fiscal Responsibility and Reform, a bipartisan panel chaired by former Senator Alan K. Simpson, (R-WY), and former White House Chief of Staff Erskine Bowles (D). The balance of the panel was three more members appointed by the President, six members of the U.S. House of Representatives, and six members of the U.S. Senate. The commission first met on April 27, 2010 and had a December report deadline. Though specific actions based on the report were limited, commission members who were also members of Congress reappeared in the so-called Gang of Six in spring and summer, 2011, in the debt-ceiling-increase debate.

In September 2010, Fudge was listed as one of several possible candidates to replace Larry Summers as director of the National Economic Council. Some reports signalled that the White House could be looking for a female executive with business experience to fill the post.

In September 2011, Fudge joined in the Committee for a Responsible Federal Budget (CRFB) "Go Big" forum. CRFB, along with the New America Foundation, the Concord Coalition, and the Bipartisan Policy Center "discuss[ed] the path ahead for the Joint Select Committee on Deficit Reduction (Super Committee) and the reasons it should exceed its mandate".

Fudge also is on the State Department's Foreign Affairs Policy Board.

== Personal life ==
As a sophomore at Simmons, Ann married Rich Fudge. Before she graduated, they had a baby, Rich, Jr. She had to balance personal and academic/professional demands from that early stage on. "Her fondest memory from General Mills ... involved her younger son, Kevin, then 9. Ms. Fudge had just been made a marketing director, the first black at that level. 'I came home all excited, and was telling my family, and he said: "What's the big deal, mom? So now instead of one brand, you have four. You can do that." He was right. My sons have helped keep things in perspective.'"

Fudge is also noted for having pursued her career despite the glass ceiling which has been seen to thwart promotion to the top ranks, facing women and minorities in the corporate workforce particularly. And, in regards Fudge's relatively early moves out of jobs, the 2004 Business Week article also included a sidebar on four "other women [who] left high-powered positions in the corporate world to find a place where they could work on their own terms."

Fudge is currently based in Chestnut Hill, Massachusetts. She and her husband have five grandchildren. She is Catholic.

== Awards and honors ==
- Candace Award, National Coalition of 100 Black Women, 1991.
- American Academy of Arts and Sciences Fellow, 2019.
