= Anne Finucane =

American banker (born 1952)

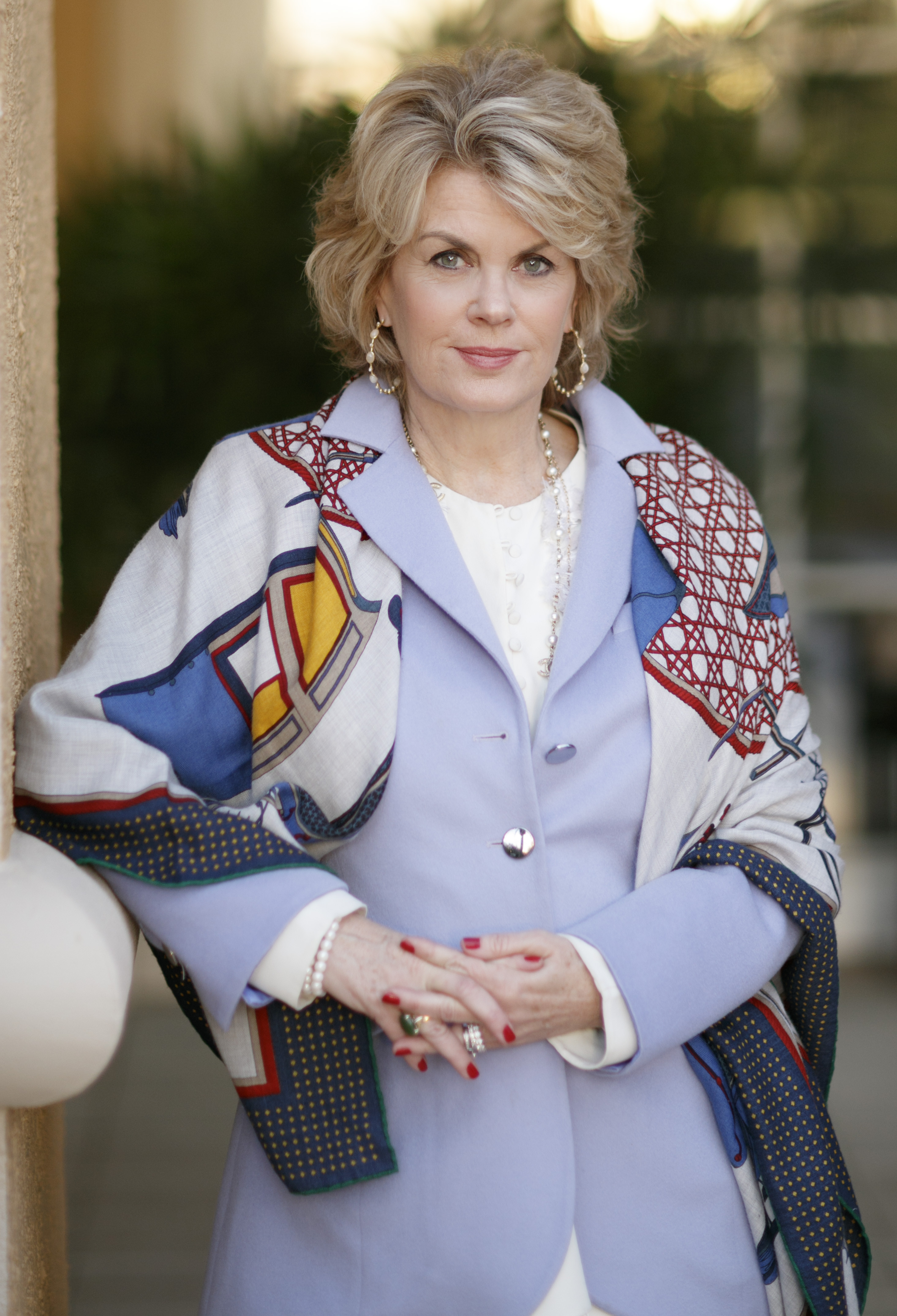
- Finucane in 2018

Personal details
- Born: July 18, 1952 (age 74) Boston, Massachusetts, U.S.
- Spouse: Mike Barnicle
- Children: 4
- Education: University of New Hampshire, Durham (BA)

Anne Finucane (born July 18, 1952) is an American banker who was the first female vice chair of Bank of America and chair of Bank of America Europe until retiring from the bank in 2021, and from her BofA Europe chair role at the end of 2022, after which she became a senior advisor to TPG Rise Climate and chair of Rubicon Carbon. While at Bank of America, she established and led its $1 trillion Environmental Business Initiative, as well as its sustainable finance, global public policy, and environmental, social and corporate governance committee.

Finucane started working in the banking industry in 1995, when she joined Fleet Financial, which later merged with the short-lived BankBoston to become part of Bank of America. She is on the board of several organizations and lives in Lincoln, Massachusetts.

== Early life and education ==
Finucane was born to an Irish-American family, and raised as the fourth of six children in Newton, Massachusetts. The lineages of both her parents trace back to County Cork. Her father, William, "was general counsel to the Boston Patriots and local banks. Her mother, Mary, was a homemaker and distant relative of Tip O'Neill. Finucane was friends with one of Robert Q. Crane's daughters, and Crane introduced Finucane to the then Mayor of Boston, Kevin White. Following completion of her studies at the University of New Hampshire, Finucane worked in the mayor's arts office.

== Career ==
Finucane entered the banking industry when she joined Fleet Financial in 1995, as head of corporate affairs and marketing. She worked to improve the bank's reputation following a subprime lending crisis, and helped in company acquisitions. Fleet Financial later merged with BankBoston, then Bank of America. Finucane became FleetBoston Financial's executive vice president for corporate marketing and communications. She was Bank of America's global chief strategy and marketing officer after the 2008 financial crisis when the bank lost 55% of its value, "symboliz[ing] all that was wrong" with US banks.

She became the company's vice chair in 2015. Finucane co-chaired the company's sustainable markets committee, chairs the environmental, social and corporate governance committee, leads customer analytics, global marketing, and public policy strategies, and chairs the Bank of American Charitable Foundation.

In mid-2017, Finucane was reportedly considered for Uber's vacant chief executive officer position, following the resignation of Travis Kalanick. In September 2017, she led Bank of America's European bank board, retiring in 2021.

=== Recognition ===
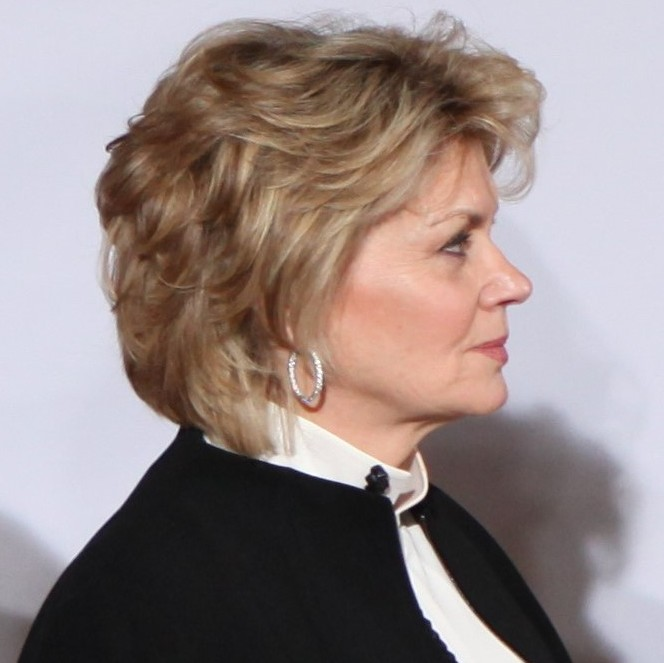
Anne Finucane in 2017

Finucane was named to Forbes' "most powerful women" lists in 2018, 2019 and 2020 and has ranked highly on lists of influential American women, including American Banker's "most powerful women" lists in 2009, 2011–2012, and 2014–2017, and Fortune's "most powerful women" lists between 2016 and 2020. Finucane was included in PRWeek's 2013 "Power List", was ranked sixth on Boston's list of "The 100 Women Who Run This Town" in 2010, and ranked number 20 in Forbes' 2014 list of "50 Most Influential CMOs" in the world. She was named to Barron's 100 Most Influential Women in U.S. Finance list in 2021. In 2019, Finucane was inducted into the American Advertising Federation's Advertising Hall of Fame. Other honors include induction into the Academy of Distinguished Bostonians by the Greater Boston Chamber of Commerce, and a Matrix Award from the Association for Women in Communications' New York affiliate, both in 2013. Additionally, she was honored by the Roman Catholic Archdiocese of Boston's Planning Office for Urban Affairs for her "commitment and work in the name of social justice" in 2017.

In 2021, Finucane was selected for the inaugural Forbes 50 Over 50, made up of entrepreneurs, leaders, scientists, and creators who are over the age of 50.

=== Other work ===
U.S. President Joe Biden appointed Finucane to the President's Intelligence Advisory Board in 2022. As of 2016, she was advising U.S. Secretary of State John Kerry as part of the Department of State's Foreign Affairs Policy Board. Finucane is a member of the Council on Foreign Relations and the Global Leadership Council for the Rockefeller Foundation's Global Energy Alliance for People and Planet, and previously served on the World Bank Group's Women Entrepreneurs Finance Initiative.

Finucane serves on the boards of Williams-Sonoma, Inc., CVS Health (since January 2011), Partners HealthCare, Brigham and Women's Hospital (as vice chair of trustees), One Campaign, Special Olympics (as vice chair and lead director), and The Ireland Funds. Previously, she has served on the boards of Carnegie Hall, the National September 11 Memorial & Museum, the International Center for Journalists, the John F. Kennedy Presidential Library, the Boston Public Library Foundation, the Museum of Fine Arts, Boston, and the John F. Kennedy Library Foundation, and she was president of the Massachusetts Women's Forum.

== Personal life ==
Finucane is married to the journalist Mike Barnicle, who has three children from another marriage; the couple have four adult children of their own, and live in Lincoln, Massachusetts. In 2012, Boston magazine included Finucane and Barnicle in a list of the city's "power couples".
