= Kim Holmes =

American government official (born 1952)

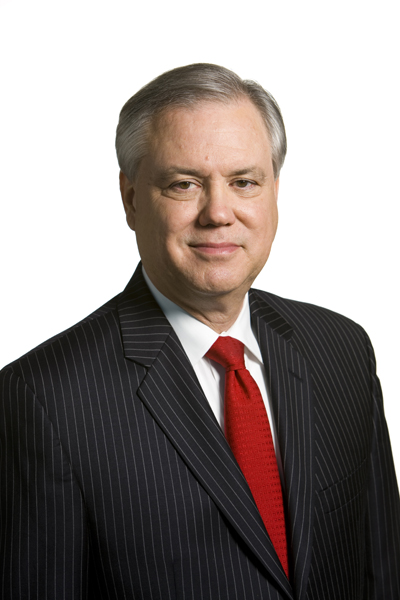
- Holmes in 2009

22nd United States Assistant Secretary of State for International Organization Affairs
- In office November 21, 2002 – May 1, 2005
- President: George W. Bush
- Preceded by: David Welch
- Succeeded by: Kristen Silverberg

Personal details
- Born: 1952 (age 73–74)
- Party: Republican
- Education: University of Central Florida (BA); Georgetown University (MA, PhD)

Kim R. Holmes (born 1952) is an author and former American diplomat and Assistant Secretary of State. From 2002 to 2005 he served as the United States Assistant Secretary of State for International Organization Affairs; he was also Executive Vice-president of the Heritage Foundation, having served twice as the foundation's Vice President of Foreign and Defense Policy Studies and Director of its Kathryn and Shelby Cullom Davis Institute for International Studies between 1992 and 2012.

== Career ==
Holmes was a senior fellow at the Institute for Foreign Policy Analysis, a research institute associated with the Fletcher School of Law and Diplomacy, and was a research fellow at the Institute for European History in Mainz, Germany. Holmes first joined the Heritage Foundation in 1985. While at Heritage, he was promoted to senior policy analyst for national security affairs specializing in arms control, NATO, and east–west strategic relations. He was subsequently promoted to director — and in 1992, vice president — of foreign and defense policy studies. He served in that position until 2001, and again from 2005 to 2012.

In 1995, Holmes and the Heritage Foundation authored a report advocating for an increase in funds towards ensuring the nation's defense against ballistic missiles, stating that "the threat of ballistic missile attack is clear, present, and growing."

Holmes served as founding editor of the Heritage Foundation/Wall Street Journal's annual Index of Economic Freedom, serving as co-editor from 1995 through 2002 and from 2006 through 2014. In September 2000, he testified before Congress on national missile defense. In 2002, Holmes served as Assistant Secretary of State for International Organization Affairs under Secretary of State Colin Powell, a position he held until 2005. Later in 2005, he testified before Congress about human rights issues in Cuba, and U.N. peacekeeping abuses in the Democratic Republic of the Congo.

Holmes later served on presidential candidate Mitt Romney's Foreign Policy and National Security Advisory Team in 2012. Also in 2012, Holmes became a Distinguished Fellow at The Heritage Foundation.

Holmes has been a member of the board of directors and executive committee for the Center for International Private Enterprise, associated with the U.S. Chamber of Commerce, since 2016, and a board member since 1997.

On August 1, 2019, Holmes was confirmed by the Senate to be a member of the National Council on the Humanities.

== Works ==
- Holmes, Kim R; Kosminsky, Jay P; Aron, Leon Rabinovich (1990). Reshaping Europe: strategies for a post-cold war Europe. Heritage Foundation. ISBN 089195225X. OCLC 22958788.
- Holmes, Kim R; Spring, Baker (1990). SDI at the turning point readying strategic defenses for the 1990s and beyond. Heritage Foundation. OCLC 495545984.
- Holmes, Kim R (1991). The NSDAP and the crisis of agrarian conservatism in lower Bavaria: national socialism and the peasants' road to modernity. Garland Pub. ISBN 0815304145. OCLC 23462636.
- Ferrara, Peter; Heritage Foundation (Washington, D.C.) (1994). Issues: the candidate's briefing book. OCLC 44266938.
- Holmes, Kim R; Heritage Foundation (Washington, D.C.) (1994). A safe and prosperous America: a U.S. foreign and defense policy blueprint. Heritage Foundation. ISBN 0891952306. OCLC 31015926.
- Heritage Foundation (Washington, D.C.) (1995). Defending America: a near- and long-term plan to deploy missile defenses : report of the Missile Defense Study Team. Heritage Foundation. ISBN 0891952349. OCLC 32916976.
- Holmes, Kim R; Moore, Thomas Gale; Heritage Foundation (Washington, D.C.) (1996). Restoring American leadership: a U.S. foreign and defense policy blueprint. Heritage Foundation. OCLC 606036617.
- Holmes, Kim R; Przystup, James J (1997). Between diplomacy and deterrence: strategies for U.S. relations with China. Heritage Foundation. ISBN 089195242X.
- Butler, Stuart M; Holmes, Kim R (1997). Mandate for leadership IV: turning ideas into actions. The Heritage Foundation. ISBN 0891950648.
- The Heritage Foundation (2001). Index of Economic Freedom. Wall Street Journal. OCLC 816170371.
- Butler, Stuart M; Holmes, Kim R; Heritage Foundation (Washington, D.C.) (2001). Priorities for the President. Heritage Foundation. ISBN 0891950966. OCLC 45954663.
- Heritage Foundation (Washington, D.C.) (2006). Reclaiming the language of freedom at the United Nations: a guide for U.S. policymakers. The Heritage Foundation. OCLC 214285344.
- Holmes, Kim R (2008). Liberty's best hope: American leadership for the 21st century. The Heritage Foundation. ISBN 9780891952787.
- Schaefer, Brett D; Bolton, John R (2009). ConUNdrum the limits of the United Nations and the search for alternatives. Rowman & Littlefield Pub.; Published in cooperation with the Heritage Foundation. ISBN 9781442200067. OCLC 690327206.
- Holmes, Kim R (2013). Rebound: getting America back to great. Rowman et Littlefield. ISBN 9781442223806. OCLC 915460079.
- Holmes, Kim (2015). "Ronald Reagan's Approach to the United Nations". In Kengor, Paul; Chidester, Jeffrey L (eds.). Reagan's legacy in a world transformed. Harvard University Press. ISBN 9780674967694. OCLC 890814486.
- Holmes, Kim R (2017). The closing of the liberal mind: how groupthink and intolerance define the left. New York City, NY: Encounter Books. ISBN 978-1594039553. OCLC 973807452.

Government offices
Preceded by David Welch	Assistant Secretary of State for International Organization Affairs; November 21, 2002 – May 1, 2005	Succeeded by Kristen Silverberg
