= Anthony L. Gardner =

American politician

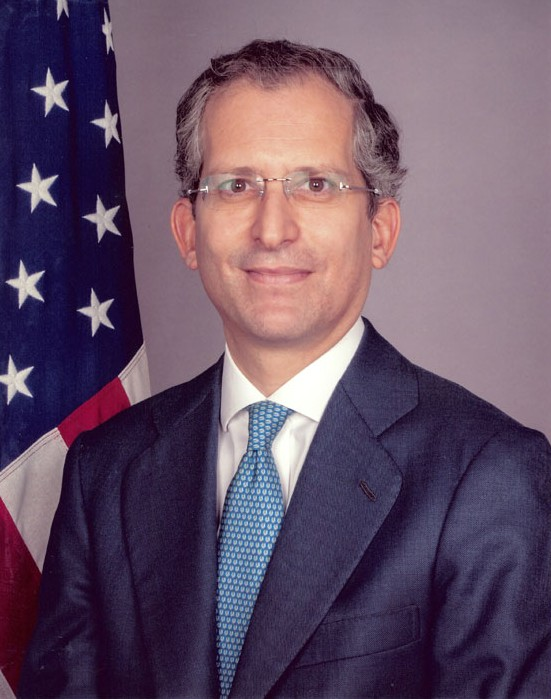

United States Ambassador to the European Union
- In office March 18, 2014 – January 20, 2017
- President: Barack Obama
- Preceded by: William Kennard
- Succeeded by: Gordon Sondland

Personal details
- Born: Anthony Luzzatto Gardner; May 16, 1963 (age 63)
- Party: Democratic
- Relatives: Richard N. Gardner (Father) Nicolas Gardner (Son) Alejandra Gardner (Daughter)
- Education: Harvard University (BA); Balliol College, Oxford (MPhil); Columbia University (JD); London Business School (MSc)

Anthony Luzzatto Gardner (born May 16, 1963) is an American politician who served as U.S. Ambassador to the European Union from February 2014 to January 2017.

== Education ==
A graduate of Phillips Exeter Academy in 1981, Gardner holds a BA in Government from Harvard University, an MPhil in International Relations from Oxford University, a JD from Columbia Law School, and a Masters in Finance from London Business School. He is fluent in French and Italian, and is conversant in Spanish.

== Career ==
Gardner is currently Managing Partner of Brookfield's private equity group, based in London. Before becoming U.S. ambassador to the EU, Gardner was managing director for six years at a private equity firm based in London. Before that he worked for both Bank of America and GE Capital in London, as well as for several international law firms in London, Brussels, Paris and New York. He also worked with the European Commission (Directorate General for Competition Policy), the Commission des Operations de Bourse in Paris and the Treuhandanstalt (German Privatization Ministry) in Berlin. He has lived in London with his family since July 2000.

=== Diplomatic career ===
Gardner served as Director for European Affairs on the National Security Council in 1994-95. In 2013, he was appointed by President Obama to head the US Mission to the European Union. In his testimony before the Senate on October 31, 2013, he noted that one of his most important objectives would be to "help conclude an ambitious Transatlantic Trade and Investment Partnership, or T-TIP, that will position our economies for success in the 21st century." He was confirmed by the Senate on February 12, 2014.

He is also a member of the Council on Foreign Relations, a member of the advisory boards of the Centre for European Reform, the European Policy Centre the American EC Association and Seed Global Health. He is a Senior non-resident fellow of the German Marshall Fund. He has served as trustee of the Guggenheim UK Charitable Trust, and a board member for the Peggy Guggenheim Collection in Venice.

He served as a member of the Board of Directors of Brookfield Business Partners between June 2017 and June 2020, and as a member of the Board of Directors of Scottish Power between August 2017 and April 2018. He was appointed member of the Board of Directors of Iberdrola in April 2018.

In 2020, he authored the book Stars with Stripes on the relations between the United States and European Union. The book was included in the list of best foreign policy books of 2020 published by Foreign Affairs magazine.

Diplomatic posts
Preceded by William Kennard	United States Ambassador to the European Union; 2014–2017	Succeeded by Gordon Sondland
