= Gordon Sondland =

American businessman and former diplomat (born 1957)

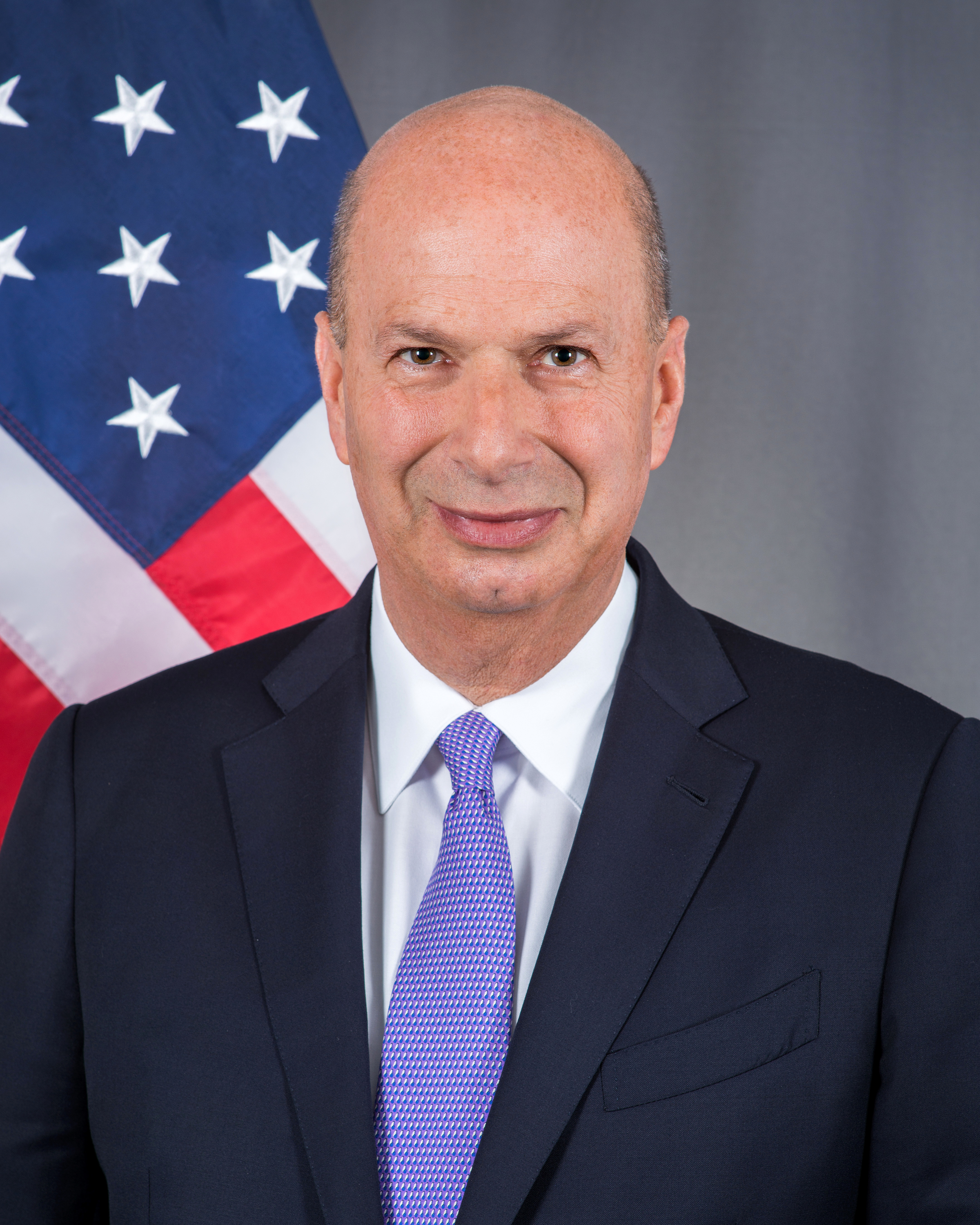
- 2018 portrait of Sondland

20th United States Ambassador to the European Union
- In office July 9, 2018 – February 7, 2020
- President: Donald Trump
- Preceded by: Anthony L. Gardner
- Succeeded by: Mark Gitenstein; Ronald Gidwitz (acting)

Personal details
- Born: Gordon David Sondland; July 16, 1957 (age 69) Seattle, Washington, U.S.
- Party: Republican
- Spouse: Katherine Durant (divorced in 2021)
- Education: University of Washington

Gordon David Sondland (born July 16, 1957) is an American businessman and former diplomat who served as the United States ambassador to the European Union from 2018 to 2020, and was a central figure in the 2019 Trump–Ukraine scandal which lead to the first impeachment of Donald Trump. In November 2019, he testified as a witness at the impeachment inquiry against Donald Trump. After refusing to resign, Sondland was fired by Trump on February 7, 2020, two days after the conclusion of Trump's impeachment trial. A lifetime member of the Council on Foreign Relations, he is the founder and chairman of Provenance Hotels.

== Early life ==
Sondland was born to a Jewish family in Seattle, Washington, the son of Frieda (Piepsch) and Gunther Sondland. His mother fled Germany before the Second World War to Uruguay, where after the war she reunited with his father, who had served in the French Foreign Legion. In 1953, the Sondlands relocated to Seattle where they opened a dry-cleaning business. Sondland has a sister 18 years his senior. He attended the University of Washington but dropped out and became a commercial real estate salesman.

== Career ==
In 1985, Sondland raised $7.8 million from friends and his wealthy brother-in-law and purchased the Roosevelt Hotel, a bankrupt Seattle hotel.

Sondland's company, Provenance Hotels, owns and manages hotels throughout the United States, including the Hotel Max and Hotel Theodore in Seattle, Washington; Hotel Murano in Tacoma, Washington; Hotel deLuxe, Hotel Lucia, Sentinel Hotel, Dossier, and Heathman Hotel in Portland, Oregon; The Hotel Preston in Nashville, Tennessee; and Old No. 77 Hotel and Chandlery in New Orleans, Louisiana. The hotels are now owned and operated by Pyramid Global Hospitality.

In 1998, Sondland purchased and redeveloped four hotels in Seattle, Portland, and Denver including Seattle's Alexis Hotel in partnership with Bill Kimpton. Sondland also is a principal in Seattle's Paramount Hotel. Through Provenance Hotels, Sondland is developing hotel projects throughout the U.S., including in Seattle, Hermosa Beach, and Los Angeles. Provenance Hotels specializes in adaptations of old buildings such as with the Hotel Murano in Tacoma, Washington, which used to be a conference Sheraton, but now includes glass art by 46 artists including Seattle's Dale Chihuly. Provenance is also known for designing or remodeling each hotel around themes that contain elements that relate to a location's history, art, culture, and local businesses.

In 2013, Sondland and Provenance completed a renovation of Portland's historic Governor Hotel, renaming it Sentinel. In December 2015, Sondland and Provenance announced the establishment of the company's first real estate investment fund, Provenance Hotel Partners Fund I. The $525 million fund was created specifically for hotel real estate investment and, at the time of its announcement, was the fourth largest fund ever launched in the state of Oregon.

Following his appointment as U.S. Ambassador to the European Union by President Trump, Sondland's name was removed from the Provenance Hotels' website, as required by U.S. ethics rules, and replaced with that of his wife, who was then listed as the chairman.

== Political involvement ==
Sondland was a member of the transition team for Oregon Democratic Governor Ted Kulongoski's administration and was appointed by Kulongoski to serve on the board of the Governor's Office of Film & Television. He was appointed the commission's chair in 2002 and served in that capacity until 2015. During his tenure on the film board, Sondland was instrumental in bringing the production of such television series as Leverage, The Librarians, and Grimm to Oregon and presided over the state securing the production of feature-length films such as Wild starring Reese Witherspoon, Thumbsucker starring Tilda Swinton, and The Ring Two starring Naomi Watts. At the 2015 Oregon Film Annual Governor's Awards, Sondland received the "Achievement in Film Service Award" for his role in growing Oregon's film industry.

Sondland also served as Oregon liaison to the White House. As an advisor to Kulongoski, Sondland suggested appointing Ted Wheeler as state treasurer, which Kulongoski did in 2010. In 2007, President George W. Bush appointed Sondland as a member of the Commission on White House Fellows. Sondland collaborated with President Bush and Jay Leno on an annual charitable auction of an autographed vehicle, with proceeds benefitting the Fisher House Foundation and the George W. Bush Foundation's Military Service Initiative. He was a bundler for Mitt Romney's 2012 Presidential campaign, and in 2012, Sondland was selected to serve as a member of Mitt Romney's presidential transition team.

During the 2016 United States presidential election, Sondland initially supported Donald Trump, but cancelled a fundraiser after Trump's attacks on Khizr and Ghazala Khan. At the time, a spokesperson for Sondland said that Trump's "positions do not align with [Sondland's] personal beliefs and values". In April 2017, it was revealed that Sondland's $1 million donation to the Donald Trump Presidential Inaugural Committee was made public through the campaign contribution disclosure process. His contribution was made through four LLCs: BV-2 LLC, Dunson Cornerstone LLC, Buena Vista Investments LLC, and Dunson Investments LLC.

In 2024, Sondland announced in an appearance on MSNBC that he viewed the Biden–Harris administration as more of a threat to democracy than the January 6 events, and was endorsing Trump's candidacy in the 2024 election.

== United States ambassador to the European Union ==
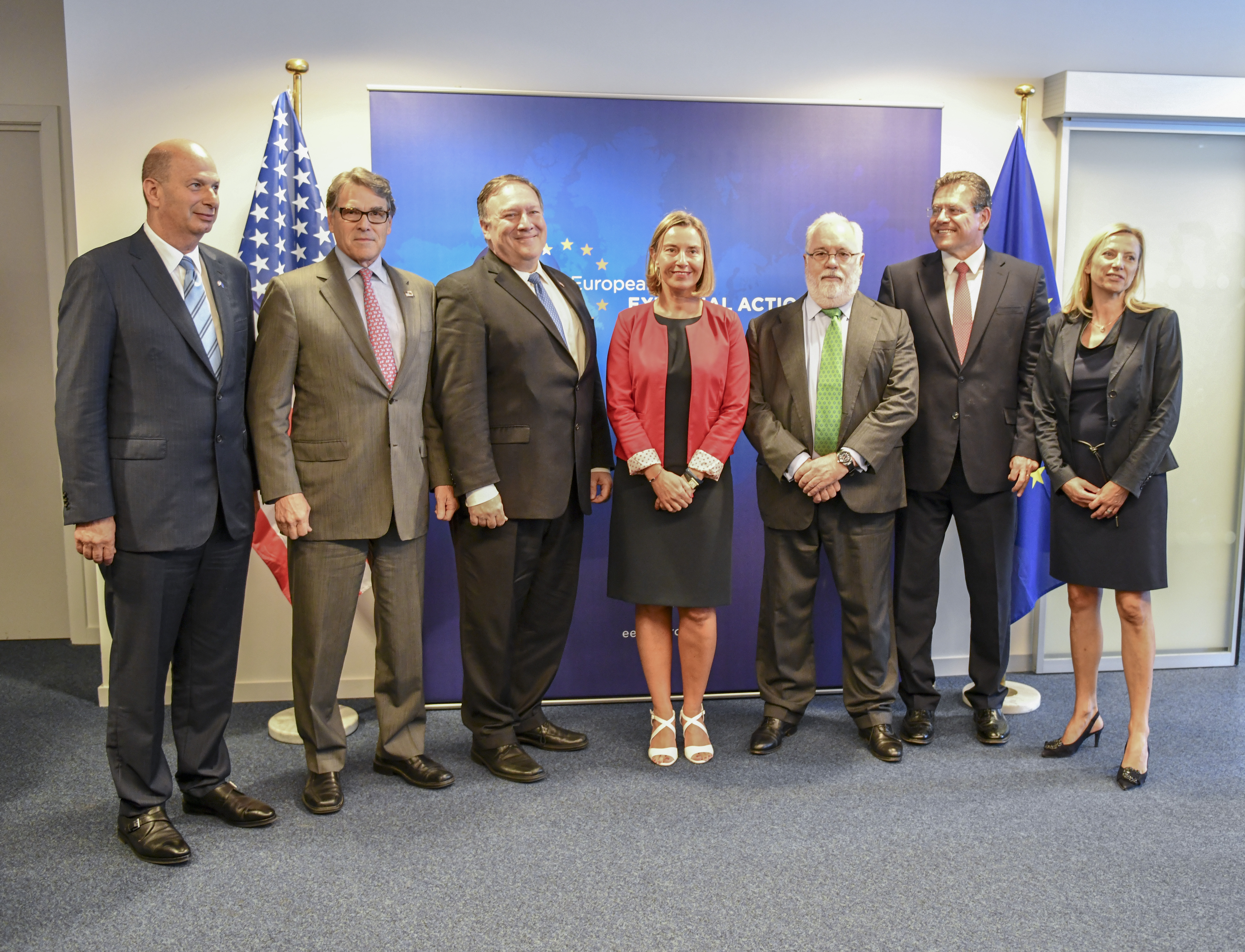
Sondland (far left) at the United States–EU Energy Council meeting in Brussels on July 12, 2018

In March 2018, President Trump selected Sondland to be the next United States ambassador to the European Union, a position which had been vacant since January 2016. Sondland's nomination received bipartisan support and he was unanimously confirmed by the Senate on June 28, 2018.

As ambassador, Sondland said that strengthening US-EU trade relations was a top priority. He supported using a strong US-EU economic partnership to counter what he called "economic aggression and unfair trade practices" from China. In pursuit of this end, Sondland promoted the idea of giving European governments access to the Committee on Foreign Investment in the United States (CFIUS) to allow them to better screen investors.

Sondland worked on data protection rules regarding U.S. compliance with the EU–US Privacy Shield. He also pledged to work with the EU to address global security threats. He was the Trump Administration's lead in talks with EU member countries on the U.S.'s decertification and withdrawal from the Iran Nuclear Deal. Sondland repeatedly criticized EU member countries' creation of a "special purpose vehicle" (SPV) to bypass reimposed U.S. sanctions on Iran, calling the SPV a "paper tiger".

Sondland was a vocal opponent of the construction of Russia's Nord Stream 2 pipeline, which would transport gas across the Baltic Sea to the EU. He argued that the pipeline would leave the EU dependent upon Russia for its energy needs and increase Russia's leverage on key U.S. allies in NATO. Sondland argued that "Putin uses energy as a political weapon. The EU should not rely on a bare-chested version of the Harry Potter villain Lord Voldemort as a supplier, even if his gas is a bit cheaper." Concerning Germany, he said: "It's very frustrating, because Germany is only thinking in terms of its own parochial needs and ignoring those of the U.S. – one of its closest friends and allies – and of the other 27 Member States." He emphasized that the EU and U.S. shared common legal and political values that could sort out any issues.

The Washington Post wrote that Sondland gained a reputation for "being indiscreet" and that officials "chastised [him] for using his personal phone for state business". He habitually traveled to Romania, Israel and other countries without coordinating his meetings with other officials. It was noted that he seemed to spend an inordinate amount of time in Washington. A former White House official commented: "He always seemed to be in D.C. People would say, 'Does he spend any time in Brussels?'" The Post wrote: "Sondland's approach to the job was seen more as a source of irritation than trouble until May [2019], when he moved to stake his claim to the U.S.-Ukraine relationship."

== Trump–Ukraine scandal ==
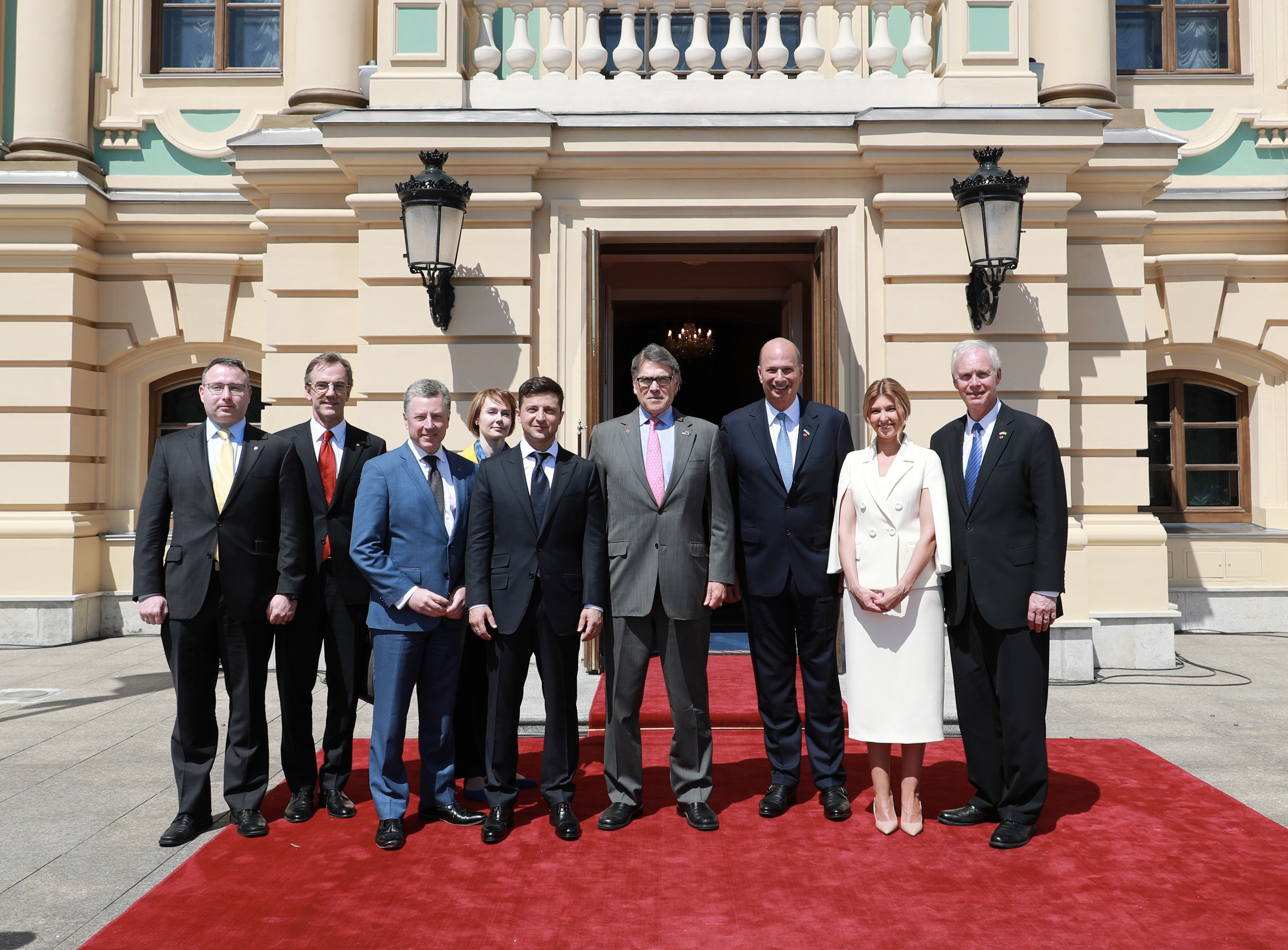
Volodymyr Zelenskyy and the U.S. delegation at the May 20, 2019 presidential inauguration of Zelenskyy

On September 26, 2019, the United States House Permanent Select Committee on Intelligence released the unclassified text of the whistleblower complaint regarding the interactions between United States President Donald Trump and Ukraine President Volodymyr Zelenskyy. In this document, Ambassador Sondland, along with U.S. Special Representative for Ukraine Negotiations Ambassador Kurt Volker were described as having "provided advice to the Ukrainian leadership about how to 'navigate' the demands that the President had made of Mr. Zelensky". In an email exchange on July 19 they discussed the arrangements for the upcoming call between Trump and Zelenskyy. Sondland wrote that he had briefed Zelenskyy and Volkner responded that the most important thing that Zelenskyy needed to tell Trump was that "he will help investigation and address any specific personnel issues if there are any."

In the complaint released by the Committee Sondland's involvement in President Donald Trump's activity was also outlined in text conversations with the interim chargé d'affaires for Ukraine Bill Taylor. In an email exchange on July 21 Taylor wrote:

Gordon, one thing Kurt and I talked about yesterday was Sasha Danyliuk's point that President Zelenskyy is sensitive about Ukraine being taken seriously, not merely as an instrument in Washington domestic, reelection politics." Sondland replied, "Absolutely, but we need to get the conversation started and the relationship built, irrespective of the pretext."

In a September 1 email Taylor wrote, "Are we now saying that security assistance and WH meeting are conditioned on investigations?" to which Sondland replied, "Call me." On September 9 Taylor wrote: "As I said on the phone, I think it's crazy to withhold security assistance for help with a political campaign," and after a five-hour pause Sondland replied:

"Bill, I believe you are incorrect about President Trump's intentions. The President has been crystal clear no quid pro quo's of any kind. The President is trying to evaluate whether Ukraine is truly going to adopt the transparency and reforms that President Zelenskyy promised during his campaign I suggest we stop the back and forth by text If you still have concerns I recommend you give Lisa Kenna or S a call to discuss them directly. Thanks."

In his testimony before the committee, Sondland said that after the email exchange in which Taylor had expressed concerns about withholding the security assistance he called Trump asking for clarity on exactly what he wanted. He said he clearly remembered the call and characterized it saying, “it was a very short, abrupt conversation. He was not in a good mood. And he just said, ‘I want nothing. I want nothing. I want no quid pro quo. Tell [Ukrainian president Volodymyr] Zelenskyy to do the right thing.'” The Washington Post noted that adjusting for time differences, the call would have taken place between 12:31 a.m. Eastern time and 5:19 a.m. and the White House reported no record of a September 9 call between Trump and Sondland.

Although The Washington Post asserted that Sondland "had no apparent standing to seize [the Ukraine] portfolio", Sondland testified before the House Intelligence Committee that "[f]rom [his] very first days as ambassador, Ukraine [was] a part of [his] broader work pursuing U.S. national interests" since "Ukraine's political and economic development are critical to the long-lasting stability of Europe." Sondland received briefing materials and briefings from the State Department prior to taking the posts, which included EU relations with the U.S. and Ukraine as an important part of his portfolio.

=== Closed-door testimony relating to Sondland ===
On October 8, the Trump administration attempted to block Sondland from testifying in the impeachment inquiry. Sondland testified October 17, 2019.

Three weeks later, on November 5, and following the testimony of other senior national security officials who told lawmakers that security assistance was also used to try to compel the Ukrainians to open investigations that might be of benefit to the Trump 2020 campaign, Sondland said that the testimony of the others had "refreshed" his memory, and he provided updated testimony stating that he did, in fact, view delivery of the aid package as contingent upon the Ukrainian government making a public statement reopening the investigation into Burisma as desired by the President. According to the testimony, he relayed this position to Ukrainian government officials.

In early November, Fiona Hill testified that Sondland, as a newcomer unaccustomed to diplomatic protocols, exhibited behavior that was "comical" but "deeply concerning", and his lack of adherence to security protocols made him a "counterintelligence risk". Hill testified that in July, Sondland attended a meeting with Ukrainian officials and told them that an Oval Office meeting with Trump would occur if investigations began. She testified: "Ambassador Sondland blurted out: 'Well, we have an agreement with the Chief of Staff (Mick Mulvaney) for a meeting if these investigations in the energy sector start.'" and that John Bolton ended the meeting abruptly and later told her: "I am not part of whatever drug deal Sondland and Mulvaney are cooking up." In her public testimony, Hill later apologized for implying that Sondland's diplomatic activities were part of an irregular channel, saying: "I wasn’t really being fair to Ambassador Sondland because he was carrying out what he thought he had been instructed to carry out and we were doing something that we thought was just as, or perhaps even more important, but it wasn’t in the same channel."

On November 13, William Taylor, the acting head of the U.S. Embassy in Ukraine, testified that a staff member, who was later identified as David Holmes, told him that he overheard a phone conversation about Ukraine "investigations" between Sondland and the president at a restaurant in Kyiv. The call was made the day following Trump's phone call to Ukrainian president Volodymyr Zelenskyy in which he asked Zelenskyy to find information that could help with his reelection campaign. Taylor said there were two other people having lunch in the restaurant, and they heard the conversation as well. Appearing in a closed-door inquiry on November 15, in a written opening statement Holmes said he heard Trump ask: "So, he's gonna do the investigation?" and Sondland replied that "he's gonna do it", adding that Zelenskyy will do "anything you ask him to". Holmes also testified that Sondland later told him that Trump "did not give a shit about Ukraine" and "only cared about the big stuff ... the big stuff that benefits the president like the Biden investigation that Mr. Giuliani was pushing". Sondland was also heard telling Trump that Zelenskyy "loves your ass". U.S. security experts were alarmed by the fact that Sondland called a U.S. president on an unsecured line in a public place, particularly in Ukraine, where calls are assumed to be monitored by Russia.

On November 16, the House impeachment investigators released the closed-door testimony of former National Security Council official Tim Morrison. Morrison voiced concerns saying that during the time that he had worked with Sondland he was not following the normal diplomatic process as used by other personnel but rather was on "a second track", chiefly led by Sondland, "where Rudy Giuliani's name would come up". Morrison also testified that he and Ambassador Taylor "had no reason to believe that the release of security-sector assistance might be conditioned on a public statement reopening the Burisma investigation until [his] September 1, 2019 conversation with Ambassador Sondland". Morrison said that on September 7, Sondland told him of a phone call he'd had from Trump in which the president said "that there was no quid pro quo, but President Zelenskyy must announce the opening of the investigations and he should want to do it". During his public testimony before the U.S. House of Representatives on November 19, 2019, Morrison stated that Sondland confirmed to him that there was indeed a quid pro quo for U.S. aid to Ukraine and Sondland told him this following a telephone conversation Sondland had with Ukraine official Andriy Yermak on September 1, 2019.

=== Public testimony ===
External videos
- Testimony of Sondland to the House Intelligence Committee, November 20, 2019, C-SPAN

In his public testimony on November 20, Sondland said it was at the "express direction of the president" that he, Kurt Volker, and Rick Perry, commonly referred to as "the three amigos", worked with Giuliani on Ukraine matters even though they were uncomfortable with Giuliani's role. He said that the leadership of the State Department and the National Security Council, including Mike Pompeo and John Bolton, were fully informed of their activities and Giuliani's, adding: "Everyone was in the loop." He said that Trump, through Giuliani, was clearly demanding a public commitment by Zelenskyy to investigate Burisma (a Ukrainian gas company where Vice President Joe Biden's son Hunter Biden had sat on the board) and the 2016 election as a prerequisite to receive a White House invitation or phone call. "Was there a quid pro quo? The answer is yes," he said in his opening remarks. The quid pro quo in question was relating to the public commitment by Zelenskyy to investigate Burisma and the 2016 election as a prerequisite to receive a White House invitation or phone call. He said it was "his personal guess" that the aid to Ukraine was also being withheld to achieve that goal, but that he never heard Trump say so. Although he confirmed that he had conversed by phone with Trump on July 26 as previously reported by Taylor and Holmes, who both testified that during that call Trump had asked if Ukraine would investigate the Bidens, Sondland said that he "had no reason to doubt" that the subject had included investigations but he "had no recollection" of discussing the Bidens. Kurt Volker and Rick Perry also denied that the connection between Burisma investigation and the Bidens was mentioned. Sondland testified to Devin Nunes that he remains "a proud member of the three amigos" and said that he would have objected to the Burisma investigation if he had connected it to the Bidens. In her testimony on the following day Fiona Hill was asked: "Is it credible to you that Mr. Sondland was completely in the dark about this [connection] all summer?" She replied: "It is not credible to me that he was oblivious."

=== Trump impeachment trial ===
During the Impeachment trial of Donald Trump which began on January 16, 2020, and ended on February 5, The Washington Post wrote that Sondland's House testimony played a "central role" in the trial, reporting that House testimony was used both for and against a case for Trump's alleged attempt to use a quid pro quo to persuade Zelenskyy to deliver dirt on Biden in exchange for congressional funding for Ukraine. Lead impeachment manager Adam Schiff opened with a Sondland statement in which he said: "Was there a quid pro quo? As I testified previously with regard to the requested White House call and the White House meeting, the answer is yes." But Trump's attorneys used Sondland's earlier statement wherein he said that Trump told him that he wanted "no quid pro quo" and what they saw as Sondland's "tendency to portray his uninformed opinions and presumptions as fact". Actor Will Ferrell portrayed Sondland alongside Alec Baldwin's Donald Trump on Saturday Night Live's cold open.

=== Removal from office ===
On February 7, 2020, two days after Trump's acquittal, Sondland was recalled from his post, effective immediately. Several news outlets reported that a group of Republican senators, including Susan Collins, Thom Tillis, Ron Johnson, and Martha McSally, believed that the president was wrong to recall Sondland. According to Politico, Senator Johnson called Sondland a “patriot” and said he would have preferred if Sondland was allowed to leave on his own terms. Another House witness, Lieutenant Colonel Alexander Vindman, was fired on the same day. In a statement, Sondland said he was "grateful to President Trump for having given me the opportunity to serve" and to Mike Pompeo for his support. He called the time he had served "the highlight of my career."

In May 2021, Sondland sued Pompeo and the government for $1.8 million, asserting the State Department reneged on its promise to pay his legal fees. In February 2025, following a trial, the U.Sf government capitulated to Sondland and agreed to pay his settlement demand, which covered nearly all of his claim.

== Philanthropy ==
Sondland founded the Gordon Sondland and Katherine J. Durant Foundation in 1999, which was established to "help families and boost communities"; it has given money to various non-profit organisations including $1,000,000 to the Portland Art Museum to endow permanent access for children under the age of eighteen. The Foundation helped establish a Distinguished Chair in Spine for pediatric orthopedic spine research at the Texas Scottish Rite Hospital for Children in 2012. In 2014, the Foundation gave a $1,000,000 endowment to Oregon Health & Science University to establish the Sondland-Durant Distinguished Research Conference, a cancer research summit to begin in 2016. In 2017, the Center for Innovation and Entrepreneurship at Duke University was created with the support of the Foundation.

The 2012 HillelFest Fundraising event at the University of Washington honored Sondland's sister and brother-in-law Lucy and Herb Pruzan for their five decades of leadership and dedication to Hillel. As part of this celebration, Sondland and his wife, Katy Durant, gave an endowment gift which created the Pruzan Fellow in honor of Herb and Lucy. Each spring at Hillel's Annual Meeting, a Pruzan Fellow is designated from among the emerging undergraduate leaders at Hillel UW. The intent is for the Pruzan Fellow to become a key leader, role model and driving force behind the undergraduate student programming at Hillel UW.

Pursuant to U.S. Office of Government Ethics regulations prohibiting executive branch employees from retaining certain financial interests, Sondland resigned from the Gordon D. Sondland and Katherine J. Durant Foundation immediately following his confirmation. In November 2019, the Portland Business Journal noted that following Sondland's appointment as Ambassador in 2018, the foundation modified its website by removing a biography tab for Sondland and adding two new ones for the couple's children.

In March 2023, Sondland participated as presenting underwriter for the traveling Auschwitz Exhibition at the Ronald Reagan Presidential Library and Foundation. At its opening reception on March 23, 2023, Sondland spoke about his support of the exhibit, and his parents, Frieda (Piepsch) and Gunther Sondland, who survived the Holocaust.

== Writing ==
In 2022, Sondland published a book with Bombardier Books, an imprint of Simon & Schuster, entitled The Envoy: Mastering the Art of Diplomacy with Trump and the World. The New York Times called it "one of the most intriguing memoirs of the Trump era."

== Personal life ==
On September 3, 1994, Sondland married Katherine Durant, the founder and managing partner of Atlas/RTG, a holding company with a portfolio of shopping centers throughout Oregon. Until 2016, Durant was the Chairperson of the Oregon Investment Council, the body that oversees the over $85 billion Public Employees Retirement System Fund. They have two children, Max and Lucy.

In November 2019, Nicole Vogel and two other women accused Sondland of sexual misconduct. The accusations described instances of forcible kissing and retaliation in the form of withdrawn investments. Sondland denied the allegations in a statement, saying they were "concocted" and "coordinated for political purposes", and his spokesperson argued in a response on Sondland's website that Vogel's ownership of Portland Monthly, one of the outlets that broke the story, constituted an "outlandish conflict of interest". In a letter to ProPublica, one of Sondland's lawyers, James McDermott, suggested that the allegations and the impeachment inquiry were connected. He accused Portland Monthly and ProPublica of trying to "affect Ambassador Sondland's credibility as a fact witness in the pending impeachment inquiry" and also suggested the news organizations were guilty of "veiled witness tampering".

Sondland and Durant divorced in 2021; the General Judgment of Dissolution was entered in Multnomah County, case number 21DR16982 and signed by Judge Francis G. Troy, II on November 15, 2021. The terms of their agreement were not entered in the court record, citing the public nature of each party's business and political involvements. Their estate in southwest Portland, formerly owned by Durant and quitclaimed deeded on October 15, 2021 to an LLC controlled by Sondland, sold for $4.33 million in July 2022.

Diplomatic posts
| Preceded by Anthony L. Gardner | United States Ambassador to the European Union; 2018–2020 | Succeeded by Mark Libby; Acting |
