= There was no quid pro quo =

Phrase used by Donald Trump

"There was no quid pro quo" was a phrase frequently employed by President Donald Trump and his supporters in reference to the 2019 Trump–Ukraine scandal during the first impeachment of Donald Trump, denying that a quid pro quo extortion attempt had taken place.

== History ==
After Bill Taylor wrote to then-ambassador Gordon Sondland,"...I think it’s crazy to withhold security assistance for help with a political campaign" on September 8, 2019, Sondland asked Trump "What do you want from Ukraine?", to which Trump responded by saying "Nothing. There is no quid pro quo."

Trump first publicly used the term on September 22, 2019, speaking to reporters about his phone call with Volodymyr Zelenskyy. On September 25, at a press conference in New York, Trump again denied extortion of Ukraine by saying "I didn’t do it. There was no quid pro quo."

On October 17, 2019, Mick Mulvaney, then-White House Chief of Staff, said in a press meeting: "Let me be clear, there was absolutely no quid pro quo between Ukrainian military aid and any investigation into the 2016 election."

== Press interpretation ==
Some newspapers, including NBC and CNN, have characterized Trump's use of the phrase as a means of sidetracking the charges actually levied against him: abuse of power. A quid pro quo was established early in the first impeachment trial of Donald Trump.
