= David Welch (diplomat) =

American diplomat

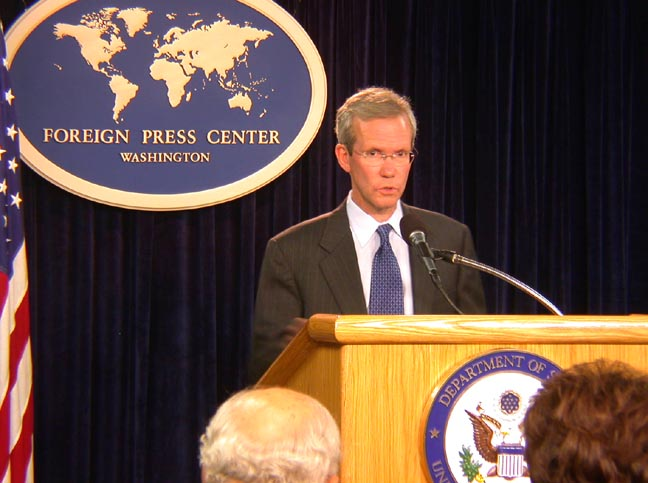
- Welch at the Washington Foreign Press Center in 2005

21st Assistant Secretary of State for Near Eastern Affairs
- In office March 18, 2005 – December 18, 2008
- President: George W. Bush
- Preceded by: William J. Burns
- Succeeded by: Jeffrey D. Feltman

21st Assistant Secretary of State for International Organization Affairs
- In office October 23, 1998 – November 19, 2002
- President: Bill Clinton; George W. Bush
- Preceded by: Princeton N. Lyman
- Succeeded by: Kim Holmes

Personal details
- Born: Charles David Welch; 1953 (age 72–73) Munich, West Germany
- Education: London School of Economics, Georgetown University, Tufts University
- Profession: Diplomat

Charles David Welch (born 1953) is an American diplomat who served as Assistant Secretary of State for Near Eastern Affairs in the United States Department of State from 2005 through 2008. On August 14, 2008, in Tripoli, Welch signed the U.S.-Libya Comprehensive Claims Settlement Agreement paving the way for the restoration of full diplomatic and commercial relations between the two countries after a 25-year break. Welch is currently the president of the Europe, Africa & Middle East division of Bechtel.

== Background ==
Welch was born in Munich in 1953 to U.S. foreign service parents, and lived with them in Germany, Brazil, Morocco, Ecuador and Mexico. He studied at the London School of Economics (1973-4), and is a Phi Beta Kappa graduate of the Edmund A. Walsh School of Foreign Service of Georgetown University (1975). Welch holds a graduate degree from the Fletcher School of Law and Diplomacy of Tufts University. He speaks Spanish and Arabic.

== Career diplomat ==
From 1977 to 1979, Welch served in the Office of the Under Secretary for Security Assistance, Science and Technology. He was appointed political officer at the U.S. embassy in Islamabad (1979–81) and returned to the State Department where he was desk officer for Syria (1981) and Lebanon (1982-3).

Welch was assigned to the U.S. embassy in Damascus as head of the political section (1984-6), and then to Amman (1986-8). From 1989 to 1991, he was a member of the National Security Council staff at the White House and became executive assistant to the Under Secretary for Political Affairs at the State Department (1991-2). He served as chargé d'affaires at the U.S. embassy in Riyadh (1992-4), continuing there as deputy chief of mission in 1995.

Between 1996 and 1998, Welch served in the State Department's Bureau of Near Eastern Affairs, playing an important role in achieving U.S. foreign policy objectives in Iran, Iraq and Libya. In October 1998, he became Assistant Secretary of State for International Organization Affairs implementing U.S. policy towards the United Nations and other international organizations.

In August 2001, Welch was appointed U.S. Ambassador to Egypt (2001-5).

On March 18, 2005, Welch was sworn in as Assistant Secretary of State for Near Eastern Affairs.

On December 18, 2008, Welch resigned from his position as the top U.S. diplomat in the Middle East to pursue work in the private sector. Sec. of State Condoleezza Rice bid Welch farewell in a speech that reviewed his service to the United States. Welch was the first US Assistant Secretary of State to resign in transition to the Obama administration. Welch is currently the president of the Europe, Africa & Middle East division of Bechtel.

In April 2026, Welch was appointed Chair of the Board of Governors of the Middle East Institute.

== Controversy ==
In an article titled "Time to Get the Facts Right," Welch criticized the Egyptian media, accusing it of "recklessness in checking the facts of serious matters." In return, the Egyptian Minister of Foreign Affairs, Ahmad Maher, said that the Egyptian press is worthy of respect and the attack on the Egyptian press did not correspond with the principles of democracy and freedom of opinion promoted by America. He added that the Egyptian press was expressing opinions independent of the government's policy. Welch later accused Egyptian journalists of lacking precision and professionalism, and of often fabricating and sensationalizing news. He specifically criticized Salama Ahmed Salama for speaking against human rights violations by Donald Rumsfeld.

Welch also appeared on Egyptian television and confirmed that America would cut off its aid to Egypt because of the stand of the Egyptian judiciary toward the case of Saad Eddin Ibrahim, an Egyptian scholar and political activist. He has also criticized a Friday sermon by the Grand Imam of al-Azhar, Muhammad Sayyid Tantawy, that described the Jews as the "descendants of monkeys and pigs." Welch argued that it created a climate that is hostile to Jews and justifies terrorism. Welch had also sent a letter to the Minister of Culture requesting the safeguard of Jewish monuments after rumors spread that mosques would be built over those monuments.

Egyptian intellectuals criticized him, accusing him of acting "the American High Commissioner in Egypt," a reference to the authority that the British High Commissioner had once held during British occupation, as they considered his statements a severe interference in domestic issues.

== Work in Libya ==
=== U.S.-Libya agreement in 2008 ===
Following months of bilateral negotiations, the passage through Congress of the enabling legislation at the end of July 2008 and the signature of the Libyan Claims Resolution Act by President George W. Bush, the U.S.-Libya Comprehensive Claims Settlement Agreement was signed in Tripoli by Welch on August 14, 2008.

Welch described it as a very important agreement that turns a new page in the U.S.-Libya relationship, and said

Under this agreement each country's citizens can receive fair compensation for past incidents. When fulfilled, the agreement will permit Libya and the US to develop their relations.

He estimated that the amount of compensation in question was $1.5 billion for the families of American victims of terrorism incidents of the 1980s that were blamed on Libya, and $300m for the Libyan families of victims of the U.S. bombing of Tripoli and Benghazi in April 1986.

In October 2008 Libya proceeded to pay $1.5 billion into a fund which will be used to compensate relatives of the

1. Lockerbie bombing victims with the remaining 20% of the sum agreed in 2003;
2. American victims of the 1986 Berlin discotheque bombing;
3. American victims of the 1989 UTA Flight 772 bombing; and,
4. Libyan victims of the 1986 U.S. bombing of Tripoli and Benghazi.

As a result, President George W. Bush signed an executive order restoring the Libyan government's immunity from terror-related lawsuits and dismissing all of the pending compensation cases in the US, the White House said.

=== Support of Gaddafi in 2011 ===
According to Al Jazeera, papers found in the headquarters of the former intelligence agency of Libya indicate that during the 2011 Libyan civil war Welch met officials of Muammar Gaddafi's regime on August 2, 2011, at the Four Seasons Hotel in Cairo a few blocks from the US embassy. Welch reputedly advised the Gaddafi regime on how to win the "propaganda war" by passing information on potential connections between anti-Gaddafi forces and terrorist organisations such as Al Qaeda to the American government via the intelligence agencies of other countries such as Israel, Egypt, Jordan, and Morocco. According to it he also recommended that the regime refers to the Syrian situation to expose what he viewed as a double standard in American foreign policy relating to the Arab Spring. He also criticised Qatar's role in the intervention, calling it a cynical effort to distract from the unrest in nearby Bahrain.

== Moroccan conflict over Western Sahara ==
Welch also played a significant role in Morocco–United States relations particularly in regards to the ongoing conflict over Western Sahara. Speaking at a Congressional hearing for the House of Representatives in 2007, Welch articulated that the Department of State sided with Morocco on the issue of Western Sahara. He explained that the conflict is a, "…destabilizing element [which] thwarts regional ties, which are necessary for economic expansion, and it has had an effect on government-to-government cooperation within the Maghreb." He then affirmed the State Department's role stating, "We have welcomed Mr. Chairman, Morocco's recent initiative to resolve the dispute…. We consider the Moroccan proposal to provide real autonomy for the Western Sahara to be serious and credible." Conversely, in regards to the Polisario's proposal Welch stated, "The Polisario proposal…does not seem, in our judgment, to contain new ideas…"

== See also ==
- Morocco – United States relations

Diplomatic posts
Preceded by Daniel C. Kurtzer	United States Ambassador to Egypt; 2001–2005	Succeeded by Francis J. Ricciardone Jr.
Government offices
Preceded by Princeton N. Lyman	Assistant Secretary of State for International Organization Affairs; October 23, 1998 – November 19, 2002	Succeeded by Kim Holmes
Preceded by William J. Burns	Assistant Secretary of State for Near Eastern Affairs; March 18, 2005 – December 18, 2008	Succeeded by Jeffrey D. Feltman
