= Global Media AIDS Initiative =

The Global Media AIDS Initiative (GMAI) is an umbrella organization that unites and motivates media companies around the world to use their influence, resources, and creative talent to address AIDS. The GMAI creates a framework for sharing television and radio programming among media companies in order to increase public health messaging. The organization also educates journalists, editors and producers on how to cover the issue. HIV is preventable, and GMAI members aim to improve public awareness and knowledge to help stem the spread of HIV/AIDS.

Within the GMAI, there are five national and regional coalitions of media companies. As of July 2009, the media initiatives in Africa, Asia, Russia, Latin America and the Caribbean included over 300 member broadcasters total. The GMAI was conceived and organized by the Kaiser Family Foundation and UNAIDS with financial support from the Bill and Melinda Gates Foundation, the Ford Foundation and the Elton John AIDS Foundation.

== Mission ==
The mission of the GMAI is to leverage the power of media to help prevent the spread of HIV and reduce the stigma facing those already living with the disease.

== History ==
United Nations Secretary-General Kofi Annan convened a meeting in New York in January 2004 to launch the GMAI. At the meeting, the Secretary-General asked the executives of 20 media corporations from 13 countries to pledge their companies’ commitment and resources to raising the level of public awareness and understanding about AIDS.

By the Spring of 2005, UN Secretary-General Kofi Annan decide to hand over the leadership of the GMAI to media leaders, as envisaged by its founders. The transfer of leadership was made official during a second GMAI Summit at the annual MIP TV festival in Cannes, France. Bill Roedy, Vice Chair of MTV Networks and President of MTV Networks International, took over as chairman. Bill Roedy formed the Leadership Committee of media executives to oversee the GMAI. Over the next 18 months, he challenged media companies on five fronts, including a commitment to airtime of HIV prevention messages, production of content offered right-free and cost-free, appropriate messaging tailored for local audiences, a workplace policy and an active partnership.

In December 2006, Bill Roedy handed over the chair of the GMAI Leadership Committee to Dali Mpofu, former CEO of the South African Broadcasting Corporation (SABC). Today, implementing partners from each of the GMAI's five regional partnerships coordinate and oversee the GMAI.

== Regional broadcast initiatives ==
Since its first inauguration, regional coalitions have been forming within the GMAI. The regional coalitions produce and share culturally relevant public service announcements, news, and entertainment programming on HIV/AIDS. Campaigns include not only radio and television pieces, but a range of platforms like consumer product labeling, billboard advertising, and mobile phone messaging. Many coalitions also provide training for media representatives in their region. Below are the official links to these campaigns.

- Global Media Aids Initiative
- Africa Broadcast Media Partnership Against HIV/AIDS
- Asia-Pacific Media AIDS Initiative
- Caribbean Broadcast Media Partnership on HIV/AIDS
- Latin American Media AIDS Initiative
- Russian Media Partnership on HIV/AIDS

== Supporting partners ==
- The Henry J. Kaiser Family Foundation
- UNAIDS
- Ford Foundation
- The Bill and Melinda Gates Foundation
- The Elton John AIDS Foundation

== Relevant research ==
The British Medical Journal published an article on determining the most cost and health effective way of treating HIV patients and preventing further spread of HIV (Hogan, D.R., et al., 2005). The article concluded that the most cost-effective way of reducing HIV transmission could be using mass media campaigns - reaching the greatest number of people using the lowest budget (Hogan, D.R., et al., 2005). Using the power of the media, the GMAI can be a significant contributor to preventing the spread of HIV/AIDS.
