= Bill Roedy =

American writer

- Born: William H. Roedy; June 13, 1948 (age 78); Boston, Massachusetts, U.S.
- Education: United States Military Academy (BS); Harvard (MBA)
- Occupations: Business executive, author, global health ambassador, and politician
- Website: billroedy.com

William H. Roedy (born June 13, 1948) is an American business executive, military veteran, global health ambassador, politician, and author. He also ran for Mayor of Miami Beach in the 2023 election.

Roedy joined MTV in 1989 as the CEO and managing director of MTV Europe. In 1994, he became the president of MTV Networks International. By 2007, he was elevated to the position of chairman-CEO of the division and Vice Chairman of MTV Networks. Between 2007 and 2011, Roedy served as the president and chief executive officer (CEO) of MTV International.

Roedy is the founder and chairman of MTV's Staying Alive Foundation.

== Early life and education ==
Bill Roedy was born on June 13, 1948, in Boston, Massachusetts to a family of Irish descent. At the age of three, his parents separated, and he was subsequently raised by his single mother in Miami. He chose a military career, attended West Point and graduated with a Bachelor of Science degree in 1970. In 1977, he left his military career to attend Harvard Business School and graduated with an MBA degree.

== Military career ==
Roedy served in the military from 1970 to 1977, holding the roles of Air Defense Artillery officer and Airborne Ranger. His service record is distinguished by his volunteer duty in the Vietnam War, along with his command of three North Atlantic Treaty Organization (NATO) nuclear missile bases in Italy. By the conclusion of his service, Roedy had risen to the rank of Captain. His contributions and bravery during his tenure in the armed forces were recognized with several awards, including the Bronze Star and Air Medal in Vietnam War, Vietnamese Cross of Gallantry with Silver Star, and the Meritorious Service Medal.

== Media career ==
In 1979, Roedy switched his career path and joined HBO as a manager of national accounts. During the subsequent years, he remained a member of the team that spearheaded the expansion of the network, working with the leading cable companies in the US. From 1983 to 1989, he served as vice president of HBO.

In 1989, Roedy joined MTV Europe as the chief executive officer and managing director.

In 2000, following the merger of Viacom with CBS, Roedy, then serving as president of MTV and VH1 International, assumed the role of president at MTV Networks International, overseeing all non-U.S. operations, including the Nickelodeon channel, later adding the Paramount channels.

In 2011, Roedy retired and left MTV Networks as the chairman and CEO of MTV Networks International and vice chairman of MTV Networks. During his tenure, MTV Networks expanded its presence to 162 countries, reaching nearly two billion people with a network of 172 channels that included MTV, Nickelodeon, VH1, VIVA, TMF, Game One, Comedy Central, and Paramount Comedy.

In 2011, Roedy authored a book titled What Makes Business Rock. The memoir recounted his career progression from military service to the establishment and expansion of MTV, a prominent youth entertainment business, in 165 countries. The book won CNBC's Best Book of Summer 2011.

== Global health leadership ==
In 1998, Roedy assumed the role of the inaugural ambassador for UNAIDS, an initiative established by the United Nations that concentrates on the global combat against HIV/AIDS. In the same year, he founded the MTV Staying Alive Foundation and served as its chair. The foundation has funded 272 small initiatives in 60 countries.

Between 1999 and 2002, Roedy chaired the Global Business Coalition on HIV/AIDS, which he co-founded.

In 2002, Roedy received the Award for Business Excellence from U.S. President Bill Clinton, representing the Global Business Coalition and the International AIDS Trust, in recognition of his exceptional contributions.

In November 2004, Roedy was presented with the International Emmy Founders Award at the 32nd International Emmy Awards. He was honored for his transformative impact on television music and his significant contributions to global AIDS advocacy.

In 2005, Kofi Annan, the Secretary-General of the United Nations, appointed Roedy as the founding chair of the Leadership Committee for the Global Media AIDS Initiative, where he negotiated airtime commitments to fight AIDS.

Upon his retirement from MTV Networks in 2011, Roedy was appointed by former President of Ireland Mary Robinson as ambassador, then soon after rose to ambassador and vice chair for the Global Alliance for Vaccination and Immunization (GAVI), a public-private organization with an extensive record of administering hundreds of millions of vaccinations across the globe. He later rose to vice chair and chair of governance. Roedy also served as the Chair of the Foundation for AIDS Research (amfAR) and served as a founding member and chair of the Global Business Coalition (GBC) on HIV/AIDS from 1999 to 2002.

== Political career ==
In June 2023, Roedy announced his candidacy for the position of Mayor of Miami Beach, Florida, as a candidate of the Independent Party of Florida.

== Board and organization membership ==
Roedy has chaired the Global Business Coalition on HIV/AIDS and the Foundation for AIDS Research (amfAR), founded and chaired the Leadership Committee for the Global Media AIDS Initiative, served as founding member and chair of the Global Business Coalition (GBC), and vice chaired for the Global Alliance for Vaccination and Immunization (GAVI).

Roedy also works with the Global Health Corps and the Seed Global Health to improve healthcare in Africa. In addition, he has supported Goldie Hawn with her MindUp initiative, targeting children in primary schools.

Roedy has held business advisor and board roles at Lionsgate, Zumba Fitness, Moshi Monsters, Fitsmi, and private equity firm TowerBrook Capital Partners.

Roedy has served on the boards of Westminster College and The American School in London (ASL). He has also held advisory board positions with Baruch College and the Berlin School of Creative Leadership delivering the commencement addresses in 1994 and 2010. Since 2015, Roedy has been a member of the Council on Foreign Relations and served as an advisor to the State Department's Foreign Affairs Policy Board from 2018 to 2020.

== Personal life ==
Roedy is married to Alexandra Roedy, and together they have four children. They reside in Miami Beach.

== Awards and recognition ==
Roedy has been recognized with several awards throughout his career. In 2002, he received the Award for Business Excellence from U.S. President Bill Clinton. He was named the Nesuhi Ertegun Person of the Year in 2003 and received the International Emmy Founder's Award in 2004. In 2005, he received YouthAIDS Family Health International and Kaiser Family Foundation Award for his efforts to raise awareness for HIV/AIDS.

In 2006, Roedy received New York AIDS Film Festival Award. A year later, he was given the AmFAR Award of Courage In 2008, Roedy received the Joel A. Berger Award and the Doctors of the World Leadership Award. He was named UNCA Global Citizen of the Year in 2009 and received the ICRW Innovation Award in 2010.

In 2011, Roedy was Inducted into Cable Pioneers. In the same year, he was also awarded the Cinema for Peace Award for his work with the Staying Alive Campaign and received an honorary degree from Westminster College, where he delivered the John Findley Green Foundation Lecture. That same year, he also received an honorary doctorate degree from St. Thomas Aquinas University. A year later, he was recognized with the Chello Humanitarian Award. Later, he was inducted into the Cable Hall of Fame in 2015.

Roedy was named a Churchill Fellow in 2017 for his contributions to the National Churchill Museum at Westminster College. In 2019, he received the Playing for Change Legend Award alongside Pharrell Williams for his impact on the music industry.

In 2020, Roedy received the West Point Distinguished Graduate Award. In October 2023, Roedy and his wife Alexandra were honored by the Gift of Life Marrow Registry at their annual Gala for their contributions to the organization. In June 2024, the American Churchill Museum honored Roedy with the Winston Churchill Leadership Medal Award in London.

In 2026, the United States Military Academy dedicated the second-floor rotunda of the Jefferson Hall Library and Learning Center as the Roedy Rotunda, honoring William H. Roedy's military service, media career, and contributions to global health. The rotunda was named in honor of Roedy and in memory of his father, Colonel William H. Roedy Sr. '40, a veteran of World War II, Korea, and Vietnam who received the Legion of Merit and Bronze Star. According to the West Point Association of Graduates, the rotunda was established as a permanent forum for intellectual exchange and leadership development for cadets.

At the naming ceremony, West Point Superintendent Lt. Gen. Steven W. Gilland said, "Bill sees service as a moral duty, and he is a rare person who has made a difference in the world." He also described the Roedy family's support of West Point as "a statement of belief in West Point’s mission."

== Bibliography ==
- Roedy, Bill (2011). What Makes Business Rock: Building the World's Largest Global Networks

== Filmography ==
- 2013: Battle of amfAR
