= Nelson Cunningham =

American lawyer and political advisor

Personal details
- Political party: Democratic
- Education: Yale University (BA); Stanford University (JD)

Nelson Cunningham is an American attorney and a Democratic political advisor who served in the presidential administrations of Bill Clinton and Barack Obama.

== Early life and education ==
He spent much of his childhood in Latin America, where he became fluent in Spanish. He attended Yale University (class of 1980) and Stanford Law School, where he edited the Stanford Law Review.

== Career ==
After graduating from law school, Cunningham worked for Hale and Dorr, a private law firm in Boston. In 1988, he was hired by Rudolph Giuliani to serve as federal prosecutor in United States District Court for the Southern District of New York. In 1994 and 1995, he served as General Counsel of the Senate Judiciary Committee under then-chairman Joe Biden. He served on the White House staff under President Bill Clinton as Special Advisor to the President for Western Hemisphere affairs and advised John Kerry 2004 presidential campaign on foreign policy and trade issues. He was also a member of the Obama–Biden transition team after their electoral victory in 2008.

In 1998, he co-founded Kissinger McLarty Associates (KMA), where he served as managing partner, a role he continues at McLarty Associates, one of the two successors to KMA. McLarty is a Washington, D.C.–based strategic advisory firm that advises companies on government and strategic issues around the world.

As of 2009, he serves on several boards, including the Institute of the Americas, the Business Council for International Understanding, the American Security Project, and the US-India Business Council. He also chairs the New Democratic Network's Latin America Policy Initiative and is a member of the Yale President's Council on International Activities and the United States Department of State's Advisory Committee on International Economic Policy.

After Joe Biden won the 2020 election, Cunningham was mentioned as a possible appointee for a position within the Office of the United States Trade Representative (USTR). In 2024, President Biden nominated Cunningham for a deputy position at the USTR, however key senators refused to take up his nomination and Cunningham was shifted to a role as an advisor at the Department of State.

Before the 2024 election, Cunningham was mentioned as a front-runner for the position of United States Trade Representative if Democratic nominee Kamala Harris were to win the election.
