= Kissinger Associates =

U.S.-based geopolitical consulting firm

Kissinger Associates, Inc.
- Formation: 1982; 44 years ago
- Founder: Henry Kissinger
- Headquarters: New York City
- Services: Geopolitical advisory services
- Formerly called: Kissinger McLarty Associates

Kissinger Associates, Inc. is a New York City–based international geopolitical consulting firm, founded and run by Henry Kissinger from 1982 until his death in 2023. The firm assists its clients in identifying strategic partners and investment opportunities and advising them on government relations.

== History ==
The firm was founded in 1982 by Henry Kissinger. In 1999 Mack McLarty joined Kissinger to expand the firm and its New York headquarters to open Kissinger McLarty Associates, with the firm's Washington office on 18th Street and Pennsylvania Avenue in Washington, D.C. McLarty was White House Chief of Staff under Bill Clinton. Kissinger McLarty is a corporate member of the Council of the Americas, the New York-based business organization established by David Rockefeller in 1965. In January 2008, the two firms separated after just under a decade, and McLarty Associates, headed by Mack McLarty, became an independent firm based in Washington.

Kissinger Associates was located for nearly 40 years at 350 Park Avenue at 51st Street, in a building formerly also occupied by Peter Peterson's Blackstone Group. It was established in July 1982 after loans had been secured from Goldman Sachs and a consortium of three other banks. These loans were repaid in two years; by 1987 annual revenues had reached $5 million.

Kissinger Associates does not disclose its clients under U.S. lobbying laws. The firm once threatened to sue Congress to resist a subpoena for its client list. It has in the past advised American Express, Anheuser-Busch, Coca-Cola, Daewoo, Midland Bank, H. J. Heinz, ITT Corporation, LM Ericsson, Fiat, and Volvo. The firm belongs to the U.S.–Russia Business Council, a trade group that includes ExxonMobil, JPMorgan Chase, and Pfizer.

== Organization ==
=== Associated organizations ===
Kissinger Associates has had strategic alliances with several firms, including:

- APCO Worldwide, (October 12, 2004)
- The Blackstone Group, an investment and advisory firm
- Hakluyt & Company, a strategic intelligence and advisory firm
- Covington & Burling, international law firm (2003)

=== Prominent staff ===
- L. Paul Bremer, former managing director and former Iraq Director of Reconstruction
- Nelson Cunningham, political advisor and managing partner at Kissinger McLarty
- Lawrence Eagleburger, former U.S. Secretary of State
- Richard W. Fisher, President, Federal Reserve Bank of Dallas
- Timothy F. Geithner, former U.S. Secretary of Treasury
- Jami Miscik, former president and vice chairman, former CIA Deputy Director for Intelligence
- Joshua Cooper Ramo, former Managing Director, former senior editor of Time Magazine
- Bill Richardson, former senior managing director, former U.S diplomat, past Governor of New Mexico, past Energy Secretary, past UN Ambassador
- J. Stapleton Roy, vice-chairman and former senior U.S. diplomat
- Brent Scowcroft, former vice-chairman and former U.S. National Security Advisor
- John O. Brennan, former Director of the Central Intelligence Agency, world affairs consultant

=== Directors ===
- Lord Carrington, former NATO Secretary-General (from 1982)
- Pehr G. Gyllenhammar, Volvo Chairman (from 1982)
- William D. Rogers, former Undersecretary of State for Economic Affairs (from 1982)
- Eric Roll, S. G. Warburg & Co Chairman (from 1984)
- William E. Simon, former U.S. Treasury Secretary (from 1984)
- Saburo Okita, former Japanese Foreign Minister
- Étienne Davignon, former European Commissioner
- Gary Falle, Falle Strategies

== Clients ==
Kissinger Associates does not disclose its list of corporate clients, and reportedly bars clients from acknowledging the relationship. However, over time details from proxy statements and the tendency of senior businessmen to talk about their relationship with Kissinger have leaked out and a number of major corporate clients have been identified.

The secrecy of their corporate client list has caused problems where Kissinger or a member of his staff were called to public service. In 1989, George H. W. Bush nominated Lawrence Eagleburger as his Deputy Secretary of State. Congress required that Eagleburger disclose the names of 16 clients, some of which were his through his Kissinger Associates affiliation. Later, Kissinger himself was appointed chairman of the National Commission on Terrorist Attacks Upon the United States by George W. Bush. Congressional Democrats insisted that Kissinger disclose the names of clients. Kissinger and President Bush claimed that such disclosures were not necessary, but Kissinger ultimately stepped down, citing conflicts of interest.

A selected list of the more notable companies (from over two dozen in total) since 1982; his directorships where applicable; and some countries where known advice/contacts were used:

- American Express - Director (Hungary, Japan)
- American International Group - Director, International Advisory Committee (Argentina, China, South Korea)
- Atlantic Richfield
- Chase Manhattan Bank - Chairman, International Advisory Committee
- Coca-Cola (Malaysia)
- Fiat
- Freeport-McMoRan - Director (Burma, Indonesia, Panama)
- Heinz (Ivory Coast, Turkey, Zimbabwe)
- Hollinger Inc - Director
- Lehman Brothers Kissinger McLarty Assoc. is listed as a creditor in the Bankruptcy Filings.
- Merck
- Rio Tinto
- Volvo

== Bibliography ==
- Niall Ferguson, Kissinger: 1923-1968, New York: Penguin Press, 2015.
- Walter Isaacson, Kissinger: A Biography, New York: Simon & Schuster, 1992, updated 2005.
