= Global Business Coalition =

The Global Business Coalition (GBC) is an organization founded in 2001 by George Soros and Ted Turner, headed by Richard Holbrooke until 2009. It is involved in fundraising for HIV/AIDS research. Bill Gates also provided funding, and Trevor Neilson served as executive director.

The GBC is involved with large-scale public-private partnerships.
