= William Kennard =

American diplomat

Bill Kennard
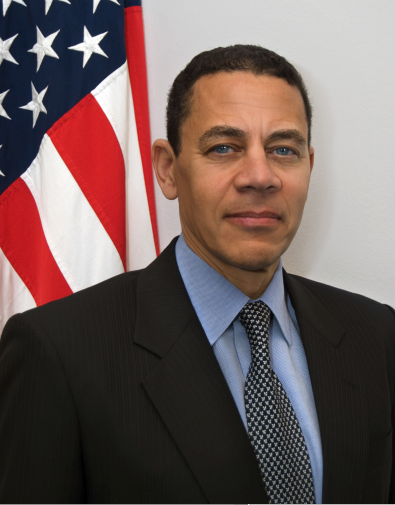

United States Ambassador to the European Union
- In office November 23, 2009 – July 29, 2013
- President: Barack Obama
- Preceded by: Kristen Silverberg
- Succeeded by: Anthony Gardner

Chairman of the Federal Communications Commission
- In office November 3, 1997 – January 19, 2001
- President: Bill Clinton
- Preceded by: Reed Hundt
- Succeeded by: Michael Powell

Personal details
- Born: William Earl Kennard; January 19, 1957 (age 69) Los Angeles, California, U.S.
- Party: Democratic
- Education: Stanford University (BA); Yale University (JD)

William Earl Kennard (born January 19, 1957) is an American attorney and former government official. Kennard served as chairman of the Federal Communications Commission (FCC) from 1997 to 2001 under President Bill Clinton, and was the first African American to lead the agency. In 2009, Kennard was appointed by President Barack Obama to serve as Ambassador to the European Union, serving until 2013.

During his time in the private sector, Kennard was managing director of The Carlyle Group, a global private equity firm. He has also served on the board of directors of several public and private corporations.

== Early life and career ==
Kennard was born January 19, 1957, in Los Angeles, California. His father, Robert A. Kennard, was a renowned architect who owned the oldest African-American architecture firm in Los Angeles. The youngest of three children, Kennard grew up in the Hollywood Hills, and attended Hollywood High School, where he was student body president.

Kennard received his bachelor's degree from Stanford University and his Juris Doctor degree from Yale Law School. Prior to joining the FCC, Kennard worked at the law firm of Verner, Liipfert, Bernhard, McPherson and Hand (now DLA Piper), where he was a partner and member of the firm's board of directors.

== Federal Communications Commission (FCC) ==
Before his appointment as FCC Chairman, Kennard served as the FCC's general counsel from 1993 until 1997. Kennard served as chairman of the U.S. Federal Communications Commission from November 1997 to January 2001. He presided over the agency at an historic time. During his tenure, he shaped policies that created an explosion of new wireless phones, brought the Internet to a majority of American households, and resulted in billions of dollars of investment in new broadband technologies. At the same time, he implemented bold new policies to bridge the digital divide in the United States and around the world.

Kennard is well known for his advocacy for people at risk of being stranded on the wrong side of the digital divide. He implemented the FCC's e-rate program, which brought the Internet to almost every school and library in the United States. Under Kennard's leadership, the FCC dramatically expanded access to communications technologies for people with disabilities. The FCC also adopted policies to increase telephone service to rural areas, especially to Native Americans living on tribal lands.

Kennard also enacted policies to create more ownership and employment opportunities for women and minorities.

=== FCC chairmanship ===
As FCC chairman, Kennard promoted the benefits of technology worldwide. He pioneered an innovative FCC Development Initiative to assist countries in the developing world to participate more fully in the global growth of digital technology. Through this initiative, Kennard signed the first partnership agreements on behalf of the FCC with ten countries on four continents to share U.S. regulatory experience with emerging regulatory authorities.

U.S. News & World Report dubbed Kennard a "consumer champion for the digital age." He has received many honors and awards for his accomplishments, including honorary degrees from Howard University, Gallaudet University and Long Island University and awards from the Congressional Black Caucus Foundation, the Easter Seals Foundation, and the Hispanic Chamber of Commerce. In 2021, he received the American Horizon Award from The Media Institute and the Award of Merit from Yale Law School, which is the law school's highest honor.

== The Carlyle Group ==
Prior to becoming ambassador, Kennard was managing director of The Carlyle Group, a global private equity firm with over $100 billion under management. Kennard joined The Carlyle Group in May 2001, where he led investments in the telecommunications and media sectors.

== U.S. Ambassador to the European Union ==
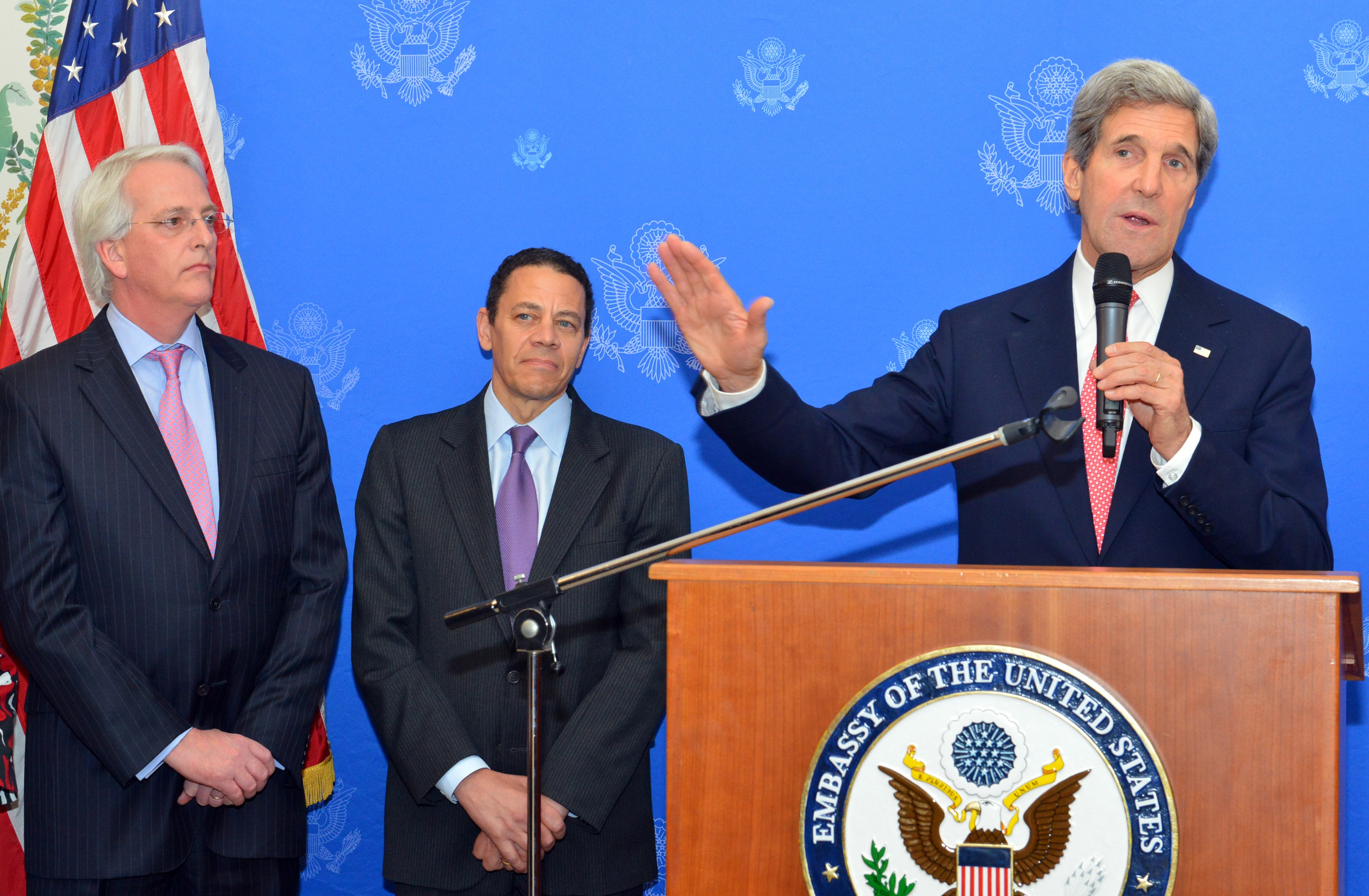
Kennard in 2013 (center) alongside U.S. Ambassador to NATO Ivo Daalder (left) and Secretary of State John Kerry (right)

Kennard was the first U.S. Ambassador to the European Union to work with the institutions created by the EU's Lisbon Treaty, including the High Representative of the Union for Foreign Affairs and Security Policy, the President of the European Council, and the European External Action Service. He also strengthened ties and encouraged dialogue with the increasingly powerful European Parliament.

In May 2012, the American Chamber of Commerce to the European Union awarded Ambassador Kennard its highest honor, the Transatlantic Business Award, for his contribution to improving transatlantic relations, removing barriers to trade, and promoting issues and policies that support U.S. businesses operating in Europe.

During his time in Brussels, Ambassador Kennard made reinvigorating the U.S.-EU economic relationship and eliminating regulatory barriers his top priorities. He was a key force behind the February 2013 decision to launch negotiations on an ambitious Transatlantic Trade and Investment Partnership, which aims to expand trade and investment across the Atlantic and contribute to the development of rules that will strengthen the multilateral trading system. He also worked to revitalize the Transatlantic Economic Council (TEC) so that it could better fulfill its mission of promoting economic growth through increased trade and job creation.

Ambassador Kennard helped cement close U.S.-EU coordination on a range of common foreign policy priorities, including policies related to the Balkans, Libya and the transitions in the Middle East, and the adoption of historic non-proliferation sanctions against Iran and North Korea. He worked to ensure that the EU "pivoted" with the U.S. when it came to dealing with Asia and integrating emerging powers into the global system. He was a tireless advocate of the need for the EU and U.S. to work out compatible data privacy regimes in a manner that protects the personal data of citizens while facilitating the flow of commerce and allowing for effective law enforcement cooperation.

He was also the first U.S. Ambassador to the EU to actively engage with European audiences through social media. One notable event took place in February 2013, when Ambassador Kennard and EU Ambassador to the U.S. João Vale de Almeida co-hosted a "Transatlantic Twittersation," a virtual conversation whose hashtag #AskAmbs reached 1,400,000 impressions worldwide.

== Boards and memberships ==
Kennard serves on the boards of several private and nonprofit organizations. He serves on the board of directors at AT&T Inc. (elected chairman of the board in November 2020), Ford Motor Company, MetLife and is a founding investor in and advisor to Staple Street Capital, a private equity firm. He currently serves as a member of the board of trustees of Yale University.

He is a co-founder of Astra Capital Management, a private equity firm. Previously, he served on the boards of directors of The New York Times Company, Duke Energy Corporation, Sprint Nextel Corporation (national US wireless carrier), Handspring, Inc. (manufacturer of the Treo and other wireless devices), eAccess Ltd. (national Japanese wireless carrier), as well as on the boards of several companies owned by The Carlyle Group.

In 2021, William Kennard joined the National Board of Advisors at High Point University in High Point, North Carolina. Kennard is the university's Global Leader in Residence.

== Personal life ==
Kennard was noted as a close friend Robert L. Johnson, chairman of Black Entertainment Television (BET), and the late civil rights lawyer Vernon Jordan. Kennard is married to Deborah D. Kennedy, a former Managing Counsel for ExxonMobil, with whom he has a son.

== See also ==
- List of United States ambassadors

Government offices
Preceded by Reed Hundt	Chairman of the Federal Communications Commission; 1997–2001	Succeeded by Michael Powell
Diplomatic posts
Preceded by Kristen Silverberg	United States Ambassador to the European Union; 2009–2013	Succeeded by Anthony Gardner
