= American Security Project =

American think tank

American Security Project (ASP)
- Formation: 2006
- Headquarters: 1201 Pennsylvania Avenue NW #520, Washington, DC 20004
- Chief Operating Officer: Matthew Wallin
- Website: https://www.americansecurityproject.org

The American Security Project (ASP) is a Washington D.C.–based think tank focusing on issues concerning U.S. national security, including maritime security, climate security, energy security, US–Russia relations, US–China relations, and public diplomacy, among others. It was founded in 2006 by John Kerry and Chuck Hagel.

== Leadership ==
Jim Ludes served as ASP's Executive Director from July 2006 to August 2011. Stephen A Cheney was appointed as ASP's CEO in August 2011.

== Activities ==
ASP publishes research reports/briefs and guest posts, hosts events such as seminar discussions with subject matter experts, and produces a podcast titled "Flashpoint."

== Publications ==
=== Reports ===
- Perspective – Innovating Out of the Climate Crisis: Reflections and Recommendations for the Clean Energy Transition

=== Briefs ===
- Briefing Note – Florida’s Wildfire Management
- Briefing Note – Innovating Out of the Climate Crisis: Hard to Abate Sectors
- Briefing Note – The Military Recruiting Crisis: Obesity’s Impact on the Shortfall

== Funding ==
ASP has received grants from the Carnegie Corporation of New York.
