= Alexium International =

Alexium International Group Limited
- Trade name: Alexium Inc
- Company type: Public
- Traded as: ASX: AJX
- Industry: Advanced Materials
- Headquarters: Melbourne, Australia
- Production output: Greer, South Carolina, USA
- Brands: Alexiflam™ Flame Retardants Alexicool™ Phase Change Material
- Number of employees: 25+

Alexium International Group Limited is an advanced materials company headquartered in Melbourne, Victoria with operations in Greer, South Carolina.

Alexium has a presence in the United States and Australia, and is listed on the Australian Securities Exchange (ASX:AJX).

== History ==
Alexium was established to develop technology supported by a strategic relationship with the U.S. Department of Defense. Alexium's Reactive Surface Treatment (RST) platform technology was originally developed in the research labs by the U.S. Air Force in response to threats from chemical and biological warfare agents.

After listing on the ASX in 2010, Alexium began building a team of business professionals, engineers, scientists and technical consultants in three global locations. In addition to the corporate head office in Melbourne, Alexium maintains a 25,000 square-foot operations headquarters, which includes executive offices, production laboratories, and R&D laboratories in Greer, South Carolina.

Since then, Alexium's technology has evolved and advanced in a number of markets with a focus on thermal management technologies and flame retardants.

== Environmental record ==
Traditional FR products contain bromides and halogens, which are currently being investigated in the US for environmental concerns. The global demand for non-halogenated FR products is growing, and many companies—including Alexium—are working to meet the demand for FR products that do not use bromides or halogens. Alexium is also working to meet or exceed the new c6 fluorocarbon requirements.
