= Danielle Carr Ramdath =

Mathematician and academic administrator

- Born: March 16, 1966 (age 60); Washington, D.C
- Education: Beloit College (B.Sc.); Duke University (Ph.D.)
- Scientific career
- Workplaces: Williams College

Danielle Carr Ramdath (born March 16, 1966) is an American mathematician, academic and university administrator. She was the first black person to earn a Ph.D. in mathematics from Duke University. Ramdath is the Senior Associate Dean of Academic Engagement and Winter Study at Williams College. She was previously Dean of the Senior Class and Associate Dean of the Faculty at Smith College.

== Early life and education ==
Danielle Carr was born on March 16, 1966, in Washington, D.C. She was the daughter of physicians, Noel Carr and Trudy Branson Carr. She attended Oakcrest School, graduating in 1983. She then attended Beloit College in Wisconsin where she obtained a bachelor of science in mathematics in 1987.

Carr obtained a masters of arts in 1990 and a Ph.D. in mathematics from Duke University in 1992, where she became the first African-American in school history to receive a doctorate in mathematics. After completing her Ph.D., Ramdath was awarded a National Science Foundation postdoctoral fellowship, which she undertook at the Courant Institute of Mathematical Sciences at New York University.

== Career ==
Ramdath joined the faculty of Bryn Mawr College in 1993, where she served as an assistant professor until 1998. She worked at the Andrew W. Mellon Foundation as a program officer in higher education from 1999 to 2007. At the foundation, Ramdath was responsible for projects for Appalachian colleges and HBCUs. In 2006, she co-authored the foundation's report into Duke University's handling of rape allegations against lacrosse players.

She later served as Dean of the Senior Class and Associate Dean of the Faculty at Smith College. While at Smith, Ramdath was also a trustee of the Cooley Dickinson Hospital Board of Trustees.

In 2020, she became the Senior Associate Dean of Academic Engagement and Winter Study at Williams College.

== Personal life ==
Ramdath is married to husband Michael Ramdath. The couple have one daughter.

== Awards and honors ==
- National Science Foundation Postdoctoral Fellowship
- First African American to earn a Ph.D. in mathematics from Duke University
