= Maya Marcel-Keyes =

American activist (born 1985)

- Born: Maya Jeane Marcel-Keyes; May 23, 1985 (age 41); New Jersey, U.S.
- Known for: Social and political activism

Maya Jeane Marcel-Keyes (born May 23, 1985) is an American social and political activist and daughter of Republican politician Alan Keyes. Despite her staunch conservative upbringing, Marcel-Keyes has been involved with the anarchist and gay rights movements.

== Early life ==
Maya Marcel-Keyes was raised in Darnestown, Maryland. She attended Oakcrest School in McLean, Virginia, a Catholic girls high school. Marcel-Keyes worked with a tribal rights group in southern India in her gap year before matriculating at Brown University in 2005.

== Politics ==
During the 2000 U.S. presidential election season, Marcel-Keyes was instrumental in convincing her father, despite objections from his security detail, to throw himself into a mosh pit organized by activist and film-maker Michael Moore during an Iowa caucus rally. Fellow Republican candidate Gary Bauer charged that the event was a cheap political stunt. In response, Alan Keyes said that the mosh pit exemplified "the kind of trust in people that is the heart and soul of the Keyes campaign."

Marcel-Keyes also worked on her father's failed 2004 Senate bid as the Republican candidate against Democrat Barack Obama. Her sexual orientation was not widely known at the time. During an interview, her father called Mary Cheney, daughter of Vice President Dick Cheney, a "selfish hedonist" for being a lesbian and then adding, without a prompt, what he would hypothetically say to his own daughter if she was a lesbian. Marcel-Keyes recalled that this was unpleasant and strange. Her parents knew that she was a lesbian since they confronted her about her sexuality in high school.

== Family controversy ==
On January 20, 2005, Marcel-Keyes—who identified as an anarchist—participated in a march protesting the second inauguration of President George W. Bush. Following that march, Alan Keyes relieved his daughter of her duties as a consultant, requested that she move out of an apartment funded by his political organizations in Chicago, and stated that he would not fund her college education.

Following the disintegration of her relationship with her parents, Marcel-Keyes publicly announced she was a lesbian. Her parents had been aware of her sexual orientation since they found a copy of the Washington Blade (a gay publication) in her room and confronted her with it during the latter portion of her high school years; they considered her sexuality "wrong and sinful", but lived with her amicably as long as she did not communicate her politics or sexuality openly. Marcel-Keyes asserted that her father had disassociated himself from her because she is a "liberal queer". She acknowledged that she could understand her father's decision because it did not "'make much sense for him to be [financially] supporting someone who is working against what he believes in.'" When asked if she was homeless, she said "'Technically speaking, I don't have anywhere to go. I have lots of friends and I could probably go crash with them. I'm going back to Chicago and I'm not really sure what I'm going to do when I get there.'" Marcel-Keyes also criticized the media's reporting of her family situation. She discussed this series of events in an interview with The Advocate. The death of a close friend who was kicked out of his parents' house motivated Marcel-Keyes to speak out publicly about the situation.
