= Brian Hook =

American lawyer and government official (born 1968)

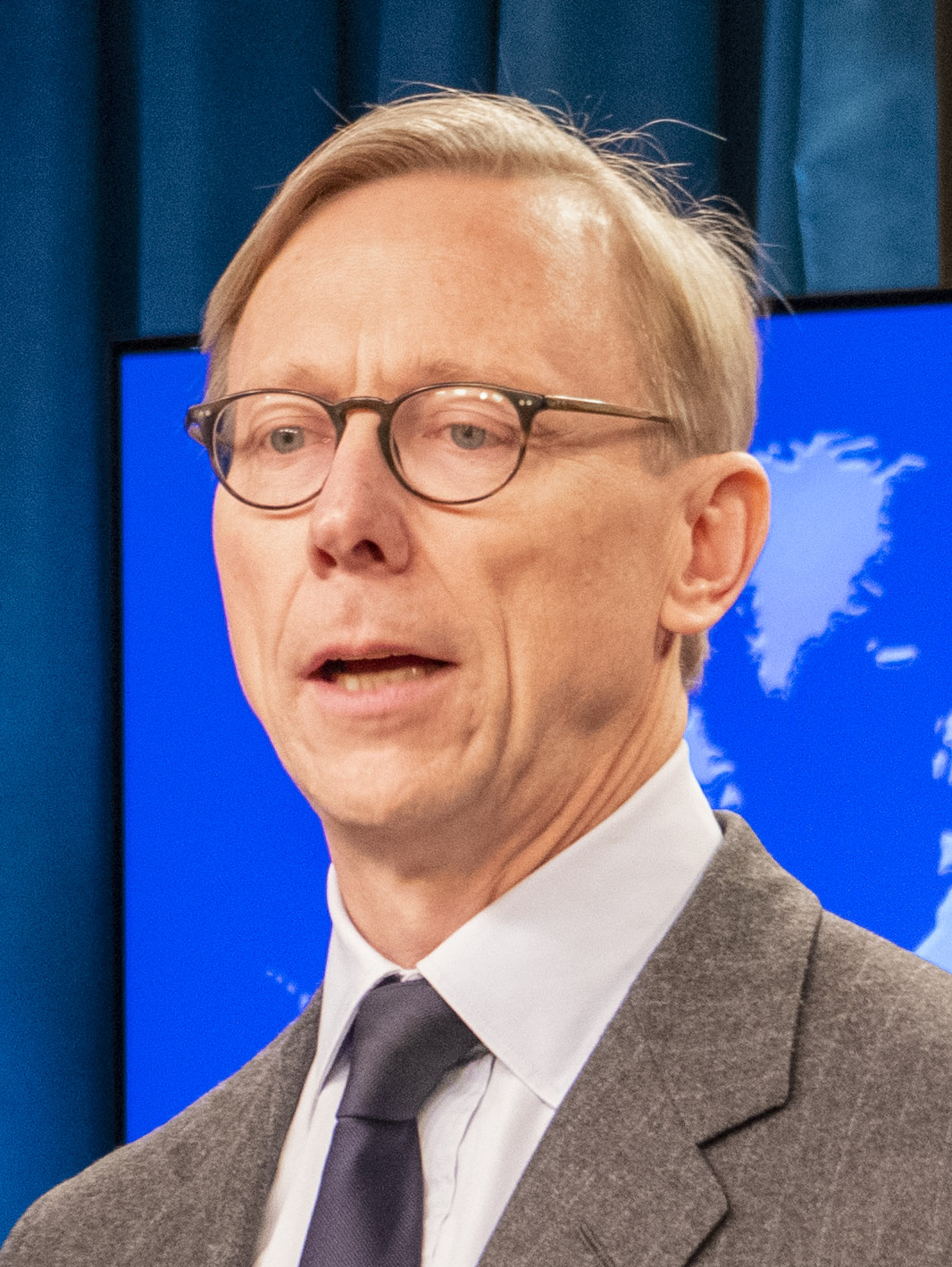
- Hook in 2020

United States Special Representative for Iran
- In office September 1, 2018 – August 6, 2020
- President: Donald Trump
- Preceded by: Stephen Mull (Coordinator for Iran Nuclear Implementation)
- Succeeded by: Elliott Abrams

Director of Policy Planning
- In office February 17, 2017 – September 1, 2018
- President: Donald Trump
- Preceded by: Jonathan Finer
- Succeeded by: Kiron Skinner

Assistant Secretary of State for International Organization Affairs
- In office October 7, 2008 – January 20, 2009
- President: George W. Bush
- Preceded by: Kristen Silverberg
- Succeeded by: Esther Brimmer

Personal details
- Born: 1968 (age 57–58)
- Party: Republican
- Education: University of St. Thomas (BA); Boston College (MA); University of Iowa (JD)

Brian H. Hook (born 1968) is an American diplomat, lawyer and government official. In 2021, he joined Cerberus Capital Management as vice chairman for global investments. He is an adjunct professor at Duke University's Sanford School of Public Policy.

He served as U.S. Special Representative for Iran and Senior Policy Advisor to Secretary of State Mike Pompeo from September 2018 to August 2020. He was the Director of Policy Planning under Secretary of State Rex Tillerson.

== Education ==
Hook received a bachelor's degree in marketing from the University of St. Thomas in 1990, a master's degree in philosophy from Boston College, and a Juris Doctor degree from the University of Iowa College of Law.

== Career ==
From 1999 to 2003, Hook practiced corporate law at Hogan & Hartson in Washington.

During the George W. Bush administration, Hook served as Assistant Secretary of State for International Organization Affairs; Senior Advisor to the U.S. Ambassador to the United Nations; Special Assistant to the President for Policy in the White House Chief of Staff's office; and as Counsel, Office of Legal Policy, at the U.S. Justice Department.

After the Bush administration, Hook founded Latitude, LLC, an international consulting firm based in Washington, DC. He serves on the advisory board of Beacon Global Strategies.

Hook worked on the 2012 Romney campaign staff as senior advisor on foreign policy. He chaired the foreign policy and national security task forces of the Romney Readiness Project. He was the foreign policy director of Governor Tim Pawlenty's presidential campaign from 2010 to 2011.

In 2013, he co-founded the John Hay Initiative, an anti-isolationist group intended to inform political leaders about foreign policy.

In early 2017, Hook was appointed director of the Office of Policy Planning in the State Department by Secretary of State Rex Tillerson and the Secretary's chief foreign policy adviser.

In response to a comment by Tillerson about human rights, Hook sent Tillerson a memo stating that "Allies should be treated differently—and better—than adversaries. Otherwise, we end up with more adversaries, and fewer allies".

Hook briefed Tillerson on and promoted the Free and Open Indo-Pacific Strategy, an approach by Japan and the U.S. to expand their Asia strategies to include India and the Persian Gulf, within the Trump administration.

In 2018 Pompeo set up the Iran Action Group to coordinate and run U.S. policy toward Iran with Hook as its head.

Hook spent months traveling between the US and Europe in an effort to negotiate an enhanced Iran nuclear agreement with European leaders. Hook also negotiated the release of two Iranian hostages, Xiyue Wang and Michael White.

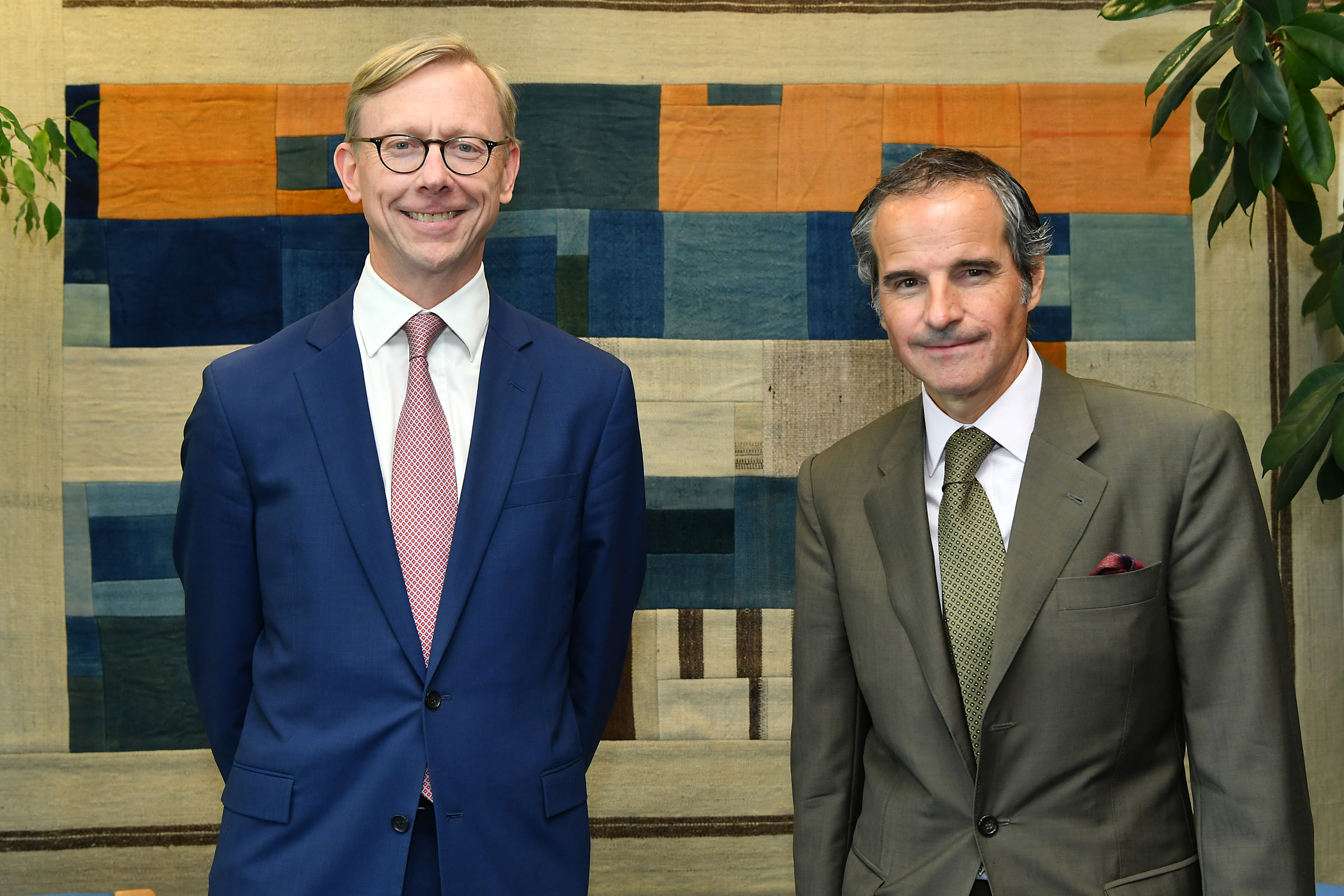
Hook meets with IAEA Director General Rafael Mariano Grossi during his official visit at the Agency headquarters in Vienna, Austria on July 1, 2020.

Hook traveled to North Korea in May 2018 with Secretary of State Mike Pompeo for a meeting with Kim Jong Un and to free three American hostages.

In September 2019, Hook was named as a candidate to replace John Bolton as the National Security Advisor.

In November 2019, Hook was the subject of controversy when an internal State Department report claimed he mishandled an employment issue with department official Sahar Nowrouzzadeh. Nowrouzzadeh had been the subject of a 2017 article in the Conservative Review which falsely claimed she was born in Iran and made disparaging remarks against her. The article was reportedly passed around the State Department, including to President Trump. Nowrouzzadeh reported the issue to Hook, but the internal report stated he did not take proper action. The author of the internal report was later fired.

Hook was a member of Trump's "Peace to Prosperity" plan to resolve the Israeli-Palestinian conflict. Hook accompanied the US Middle East envoy to focus on the economic and political components of the plan. This transpired into the Abraham Accords that were signed in 2020.

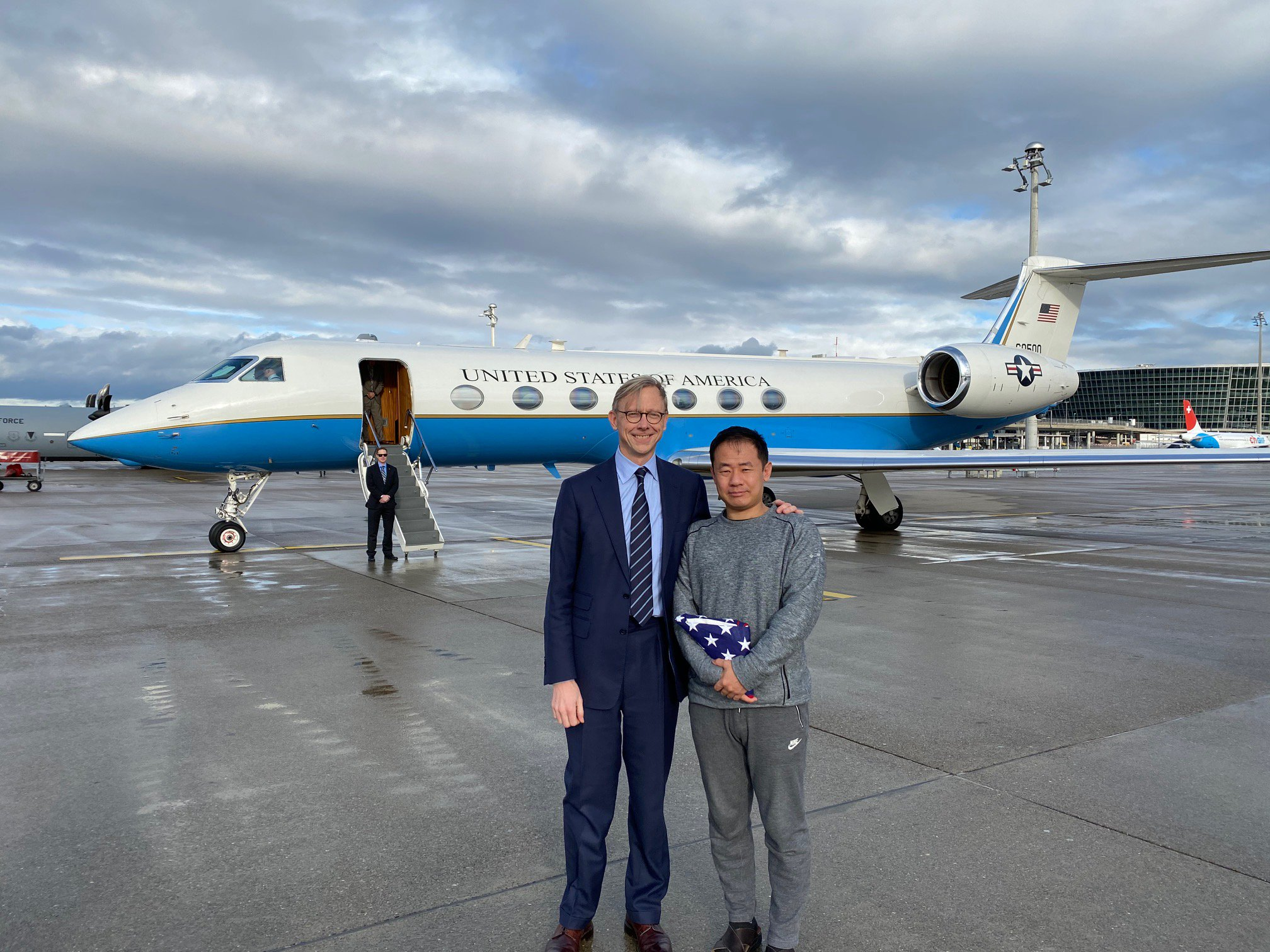
U.S. Special Representative Brian Hook stands next to freed U.S. prisoner Xiyue Wang, who had been held in Iran for 3 years.

On August 6, 2020, Hook announced his resignation from the United States Department of State. Hook was succeeded in the position of Special Representative by Elliott Abrams. He continued to work with Jared Kushner and the White House on the Middle East peace agreements known as the Abraham Accords.

After leaving the Trump administration, Hook joined Cerberus Capital Management as vice chairman of the alternative investment firm's international arm. Hook has also worked for Iowa Governor Terry Branstad and U.S. Congressman Jim Leach.

Hook was appointed by President Trump to the board of trustees of the Woodrow Wilson International Center at the Smithsonian Institution. During the second presidential transition of Donald Trump, Mr. Hook was tapped to lead the State Department transition team and was reported to be under consideration for the role of Secretary of State.

Hook serves on the board of trustees for Saint John's Seminary in Boston and the board of directors for the National Civic Art Society in Washington, DC. On January 20, 2025, Donald Trump announced on Truth Social that Hook was fired from the Woodrow Wilson International Center for Scholars. On January 22, 2025, Donald Trump revoked the security protection for Hook.

=== Abraham Accords/Middle East Peace Process ===
Hook planned the Ministerial to Promote Peace and Security in the Middle East, a conference held in Warsaw, Poland, in February 2019. The summit was attended by foreign ministers and diplomats from 60 countries.

Hook coordinated secret talks between Israel and the United Arab Emirates to coordinate military and intelligence sharing against Iranian threats.

== See also ==
- Elliott Abrams
- Jim Jeffrey
- Brett McGurk
- David Satterfield
- Iran–United States relations during the first Trump administration

Government offices
Preceded by Kristen Silverberg	Assistant Secretary of State for International Organization Affairs; October 3, 2008 – January 20, 2009	Succeeded by Esther Brimmer
