= American Academy of Diplomacy =

- Founded: July 25, 1983; 43 years ago
- Tax ID no.: 52-1341314
- Legal status: 501(c)(3) nonprofit organization
- Headquarters: Washington, D.C., U.S.
- President: Ronald E. Neumann

The American Academy of Diplomacy is a private, nonprofit, non-partisan, elected organization whose active membership is limited to men and women who have held positions of high responsibility in crafting and implementing American foreign policy. They have served the United States as chiefs of mission in major embassies abroad, and/or equivalent high-level foreign policy positions in Washington.

In its early years, the Academy provided the United States Senate Committee on Foreign Relations with commentary on the qualifications of those nominated by the President as ambassadors, but today it only does so in exceptional circumstances, such as if the Board of Directors feels strongly about a nominee's lack of qualifications to be ambassador.

The academy is financially supported by its members, and by grants from foundations and corporate contributors.

== Leadership ==
=== Current officers ===
- Chairman: Thomas A. Shannon
- Vice-Chairman: Alonzo Fulgham
- President: Ronald E. Neumann
- Treasurer: Nicholas A. Veliotes
- Secretary: Molly Williamson
- Managing Director: Maria Reissaus

=== Board of Directors ===
Members: Frank Almaguer, Liliana Ayalde, Joyce Barr, Avis Bohlen, Michele Bond, Thomas D. Boyatt, Johnnie Carson, Charles Cobb, Kathleen Doherty, Harry Geisel, Stuart Holliday, Robert Hunter, Janice Jacobs, Laura Kennedy, Patrick Kennedy, Deborah McCarthy, George Moose, Tibor P. Nagy, John Negroponte, Wanda Nesbitt, Anne Patterson, Charles A. Ray, Marcie Ries, Charles Rivkin, Pamela Spratlen, Gregory Starr, Francis X. Taylor, Harry K. Thomas, Jr., Mike Van Dusen, Jenonne Walker, Alexander Watson, Tony Wayne

=== Former officers ===
- Former Chairmen: Sol M. Linowitz, Frank C. Carlucci, Rozanne Ridgway, Lawrence S. Eagleburger, Max M. Kampelman, Samuel Lewis, Joseph J. Sisco, Arthur Hartman, Thomas R. Pickering
- Former Presidents: Bruce Laingen, Brandon Grove, David H. Popper, David D. Newsom

== Awards ==
- The Walter and Leonore Annenberg Award for Excellence in Diplomacy

The Academy hosts an annual awards luncheon at the Department of State to recognize an individual or group who has made exemplary contributions to the field of American diplomacy.

- The Arthur Ross Award for Distinguished Reporting and Analysis of Foreign Affairs

Since 2004, the Academy has presented the Arthur Ross Award to journalists who have produced the most compelling and insightful pieces concerning American diplomatic efforts.

- The Douglas Dillon Award for Distinguished Writing on American Diplomacy

Since 1995, the Academy has awarded an annual prize for a book of distinction on the practice of American diplomacy. This award honors those who broaden public understanding of the need for excellence in American diplomacy.

== Programs ==
Past
- FSOT Career Track Virtual Series
- Michigan Ambassadors Forum
- Texas Tech Ambassadors Forum
- Nebraska Ambassadors Forum
- Arthur Ross Discussions of American Diplomacy
- Joseph J. Sisco Memorial Forum
- Ambassador Speaker Series
Present
- America's Diplomats screening and discussion
- Hushang Ansary Forums: Global Strategies for a Global America
- Diplomacy and Democracy
- Diplomatic Professional Education and Training Project
- Integrating Instruments of Power and Influence

== Publications ==
- Bringing America's Multilateral Diplomacy into the 21st Century (2022)
- Changing the Risk Paradigm for U.S. Diplomats (2021)
- Strengthening the Department of State (2019)
- Support for American Jobs: Requirements for Next-Generation Commercial Diplomacy Programs (2016)
- American Diplomacy at Risk (2015)
- Diplomacy in a Time of Scarcity (2012)
- First Line of Defense: Ambassadors, Embassies, and American Interests Abroad
- Coalitions: Building and Maintenance
- Commercial Diplomacy and the National Interest
- Preventing Genocide

== Past Scholarships ==
The Philip Merrill Fellowship was last awarded in 2013. The Academy, in collaboration with Johns Hopkins University's Paul H. Nitze School of Advanced International Studies (SAIS), awarded the Fellowship for a winning essay on the practice of American diplomacy. The fellowship provided one half of SAIS tuition for two years of study.

The Leonard Marks Foundation Award for Creative Writing on American Foreign Policy was last awarded in 2009. Participants in this contest submitted essays on specific challenges to American diplomacy, and proposed policy recommendations to address them. The Academy selected three winners at differing award levels.
