= George H. Williams (educator) =

George Howard Williams (February 12, 1918 – May 18, 2003) was a president of American University (1968–1976). Williams received a BA from Hofstra University (formerly Hofstra College) and a law degree from New York University, where he became an instructor of law in 1948 and eventually executive vice president. He was a lieutenant colonel in World War II in North Africa and Europe. He won a Silver Star for bravery and other decorations and was held prisoner by the Germans for eight months before escaping. He became president of American University in 1968.

== Notes ==
Academic offices
Preceded by Hurst Robins Anderson	President, American University; 1968–1976	Succeeded by Joseph J. Sisco
