= Samuel De Palma =

American government official

8th Assistant Secretary of State for International Organization Affairs
- In office February 11, 1969 – June 20, 1973
- Preceded by: Joseph John Sisco
- Succeeded by: David H. Popper

Personal details
- Born: June 22, 1918; Rochester, New York, U.S.
- Died: March 21, 2002
- Education: University of Rochester

Samuel De Palma (June 22, 1918 – March 21, 2002) was an official in the United States Department of State.

== Biography ==
De Palma was born in Rochester, New York. He was educated at the University of Rochester, graduating in 1940. After college, he took a job with the United States Department of War in Washington, D.C. as a civilian economic analyst and intelligence specialist.

After World War II, in 1945, De Palma joined the United States Foreign Service. In 1949, he was a member of the United States Department of State's Bureau of International Organization Affairs working at the United Nations until 1952. In 1956, he became deputy director of the United Nations Office of Political and Security Affairs. He then spent a year at the National War College. He moved to Paris in 1961, becoming first secretary and political office at NATO. From 1961 to 1963, he worked at the U.S. embassy in the Netherlands. He joined the Arms Control and Disarmament Agency in 1963, becoming its assistant director in 1966.

In 1966, President of the United States Lyndon B. Johnson nominated De Palma as Assistant Secretary of State for International Organization Affairs, and, after Senate Confirmation, De Palma held this office from February 11, 1969 until June 20, 1973.

De Palma left government service in 1973, becoming international analysis unit director of ITT Corporation. He retired in 1983.

In retirement, De Palma was president of the American and international committees of the Community of Democracies. He lived in Bethesda, Maryland until his death from pneumonia on March 21, 2002.

Government offices
Preceded by Joseph J. Sisco	Assistant Secretary of State for International Organization Affairs; February 11, 1969 – June 20, 1973	Succeeded by David H. Popper
