= William B. Buffum =

American diplomat

10th Assistant Secretary of State for International Organization Affairs
- In office February 4, 1974 – December 18, 1975
- Preceded by: David H. Popper
- Succeeded by: Samuel W. Lewis

Personal details
- Born: September 10, 1921; Binghamton, New York, U.S.
- Died: April 13, 2012; Hawaii, U.S.

William Burnside Buffum (September 10, 1921 – April 13, 2012) was an official in the United States Department of State.

== Biography ==
Buffum was born in Binghamton, New York on September 10, 1921. He served in the United States Army during World War II. He later joined the United States Foreign Service. Buffum served on the staffs of Ambassadors Arthur Goldberg and Charles W. Yost at the United States Mission to the United Nations. In 1970, President of the United States Richard Nixon nominated Buffum as United States Ambassador to Lebanon and Buffum held this post until 1974. Nixon then nominated Buffum as Assistant Secretary of State for International Organization Affairs; Buffum held this office from February 4, 1974, until December 18, 1975. In the later 1970s, Buffum was Under-Secretary-General of the United Nations for Political and General Assembly Affairs.

Buffum died on April 13, 2012, at his house on the island of Hawaii.

Diplomatic posts
Preceded by Dwight J. Porter	United States Ambassador to Lebanon; 1970 – 1974	Succeeded by G. McMurtrie Godley
Government offices
Preceded by David H. Popper	Assistant Secretary of State for International Organization Affairs; February 4, 1974 – December 18, 1975	Succeeded by Samuel W. Lewis
