= Elliott Abrams =

American politician and lawyer (born 1948)

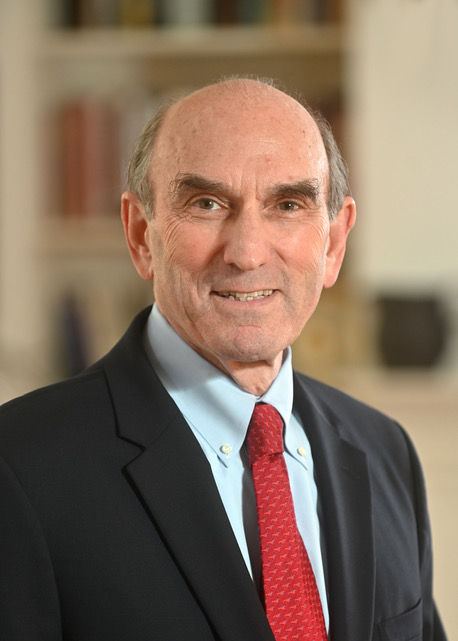
- Abrams in 2019

United States Special Representative for Iran
- In office September 1, 2020 – January 20, 2021
- President: Donald Trump
- Preceded by: Brian Hook
- Succeeded by: Robert Malley

United States Special Representative for Venezuela
- In office January 25, 2019 – January 20, 2021
- President: Donald Trump
- Preceded by: Position established
- Succeeded by: Vacant

24th United States Deputy National Security Advisor
- In office February 2, 2005 – January 20, 2009; Serving with James Franklin Jeffery and Jack Dyer Crouch II
- President: George W. Bush
- Preceded by: Stephen Hadley
- Succeeded by: Tom Donilon

23rd Assistant Secretary of State for Inter-American Affairs
- In office July 17, 1985 – January 20, 1989
- President: Ronald Reagan
- Preceded by: Langhorne Motley
- Succeeded by: Bernard Aronson

3rd Assistant Secretary of State for Human Rights and Humanitarian Affairs
- In office December 12, 1981 – July 17, 1985
- President: Ronald Reagan
- Preceded by: Patt Derian
- Succeeded by: Richard Schifter

14th Assistant Secretary of State for International Organization Affairs
- In office May 13, 1981 – December 1, 1981
- President: Ronald Reagan
- Preceded by: Richard McCall
- Succeeded by: Gregory Newell

Personal details
- Born: January 24, 1948 (age 78) New York City, U.S.
- Party: Democratic (before 1980); Republican (1980–present)
- Spouse: Rachel Decter (m. 1980; died 2013)
- Relations: Floyd Abrams (cousin); Ronnie Abrams (cousin); Dan Abrams (cousin)
- Children: 3
- Education: Harvard University (BA, JD); London School of Economics (MSc)

Elliott Abrams (born January 24, 1948) is an American politician and lawyer who has served in foreign policy positions for presidents Ronald Reagan, George W. Bush, and Donald Trump. Abrams is considered to be a neoconservative. He is a senior fellow for Middle Eastern studies at the Council on Foreign Relations. He served as the U.S. Special Representative for Venezuela from 2019 to 2021 and as the U.S. Special Representative for Iran from 2020 to 2021.

His involvement in the Iran-Contra scandal during the Reagan administration led to his conviction in 1991 on two misdemeanor counts of unlawfully withholding information from Congress. He was later pardoned by president George H. W. Bush.

During George W. Bush's first term, he served as Special Assistant to the President and Senior Director on the National Security Council for Near East and North African Affairs. At the start of Bush's second term, Abrams was promoted to be his Deputy National Security Advisor for Global Democracy Strategy, in charge of promoting Bush's strategy of "advancing democracy abroad." In the Bush administration, Abrams was a supporter of the Iraq War. Abrams led the 1998 Project for the New American Century (PNAC) letter demanding the removal of Saddam Hussein as a primary policy goal.

During Donald Trump's first term, on January 25, 2019, he was appointed by Mike Pompeo as Special Representative for Venezuela. On September 1, 2020, he was further appointed to concurrently serve as the U.S. Special Representative for Iran.

On July 3, 2023, he was appointed by President Joe Biden to the non-partisan U.S. Advisory Commission on Public Diplomacy.

== Background ==
Elliott Abrams was born into a Jewish family in New York in 1948. His father was an immigration lawyer. Abrams attended the Little Red School House in New York City, a private high school whose students at the time included the children of many of the city's notable left-wing activists and artists. Abrams' parents were Democrats. His first cousin is attorney Floyd Abrams.

Abrams received his Bachelor of Arts from Harvard College in 1969, a Master of Science in international relations from the London School of Economics in 1970, and his Juris Doctor from Harvard Law School in 1973. He practiced law in New York in the summers for his father, and then at Breed, Abbott & Morgan from 1973 to 1975 and with Verner, Liipfert, Bernhard, McPherson and Hand from 1979 to 1981.

Abrams worked as an assistant counsel on the Senate Permanent Subcommittee on Investigations in 1975, then worked as a staffer on Senator Henry "Scoop" Jackson's brief campaign for the 1976 Democratic Party presidential nomination. From 1977 through 1979, he served as special counsel and ultimately as chief of staff for the then-new senator Daniel Moynihan.

Dissatisfaction with President Carter's foreign policy led Abrams to campaign for Ronald Reagan in the 1980 presidential election.

== Career ==
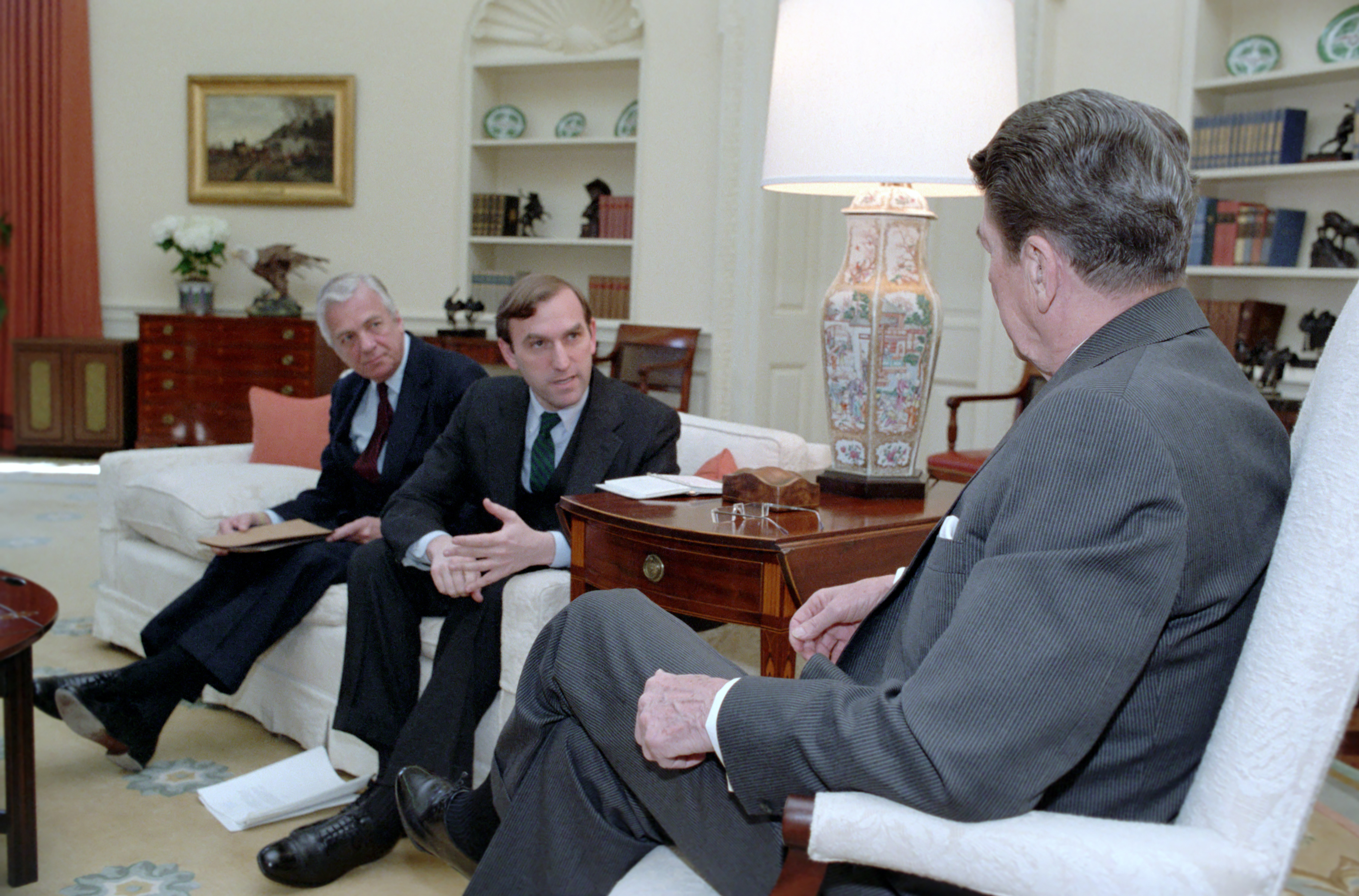
Abrams and John Whitehead meet with President Ronald Reagan in 1986

=== Assistant Secretary of State, 1980s ===
Abrams first came to national prominence when he served as Reagan's Assistant Secretary of State for Human Rights and Humanitarian Affairs in the early 1980s and later as Assistant Secretary for Inter-American Affairs. His nomination to Assistant Secretary of State for Human Rights and Humanitarian Affairs was unanimously approved by the Senate Foreign Relations Committee on November 17, 1981. Abrams was Reagan's second choice for the position; his first nominee, Ernest W. Lefever, had been rejected by the Senate Foreign Relations Committee on June 5, 1981.

During his time in the post, Abrams clashed regularly with church groups and human rights organizations, including Human Rights Watch. According to an article in The Washington Post, in a 1984 appearance on the program Nightline, Abrams clashed with Aryeh Neier, the executive director of Human Rights Watch and with the leader of Amnesty International, over the Reagan administration's foreign policies. They accused him of covering up atrocities committed by the military forces of U.S.-backed governments, including those in El Salvador, Honduras, and Guatemala, and the rebel Contras in Nicaragua. Abrams accused critics of the Reagan administration's foreign policy towards Latin America of being "Un-American" and "unpatriotic."

In an October 1981 memo, weeks prior to his confirmation in the Senate, Abrams asserted, "human rights is at the core of our foreign policy." Critics say that Abrams and the Reagan administration misappropriated the term human rights, with Tamar Jacoby writing in 1986, "in a period that more or less coincided with Abrams' tenure as assistant secretary of state for human rights, the White House endeavored to appropriate the banner of human rights for itself to use it in battle not only against communist regimes but also, in a more defensive way, against domestic opponents of its human rights policy." The Lawyers Committee, Americas Watch and Helsinki Watch wrote a report in 1985, charging that Abrams had "developed and articulated a human rights ideology which complements and justifies Administration policies" and undermined the purpose of the human rights bureau in the State Department.

According to American University political scientist William M. LeoGrande,

Communist governments were the worst human rights violators in the world, Abrams believed, so virtually anything done to prevent Communists from coming to power (or to overthrow them) was justifiable on human rights grounds. This theory fit neatly into the Cold War presumptions that framed Reagan's foreign policy and allowed the administration to rationalize supporting murderous regimes so long as they were anti-Communists. In practice, it was little different from Henry Kissinger's realpolitik that discounted human rights issues entirely.

Abrams was generally considered a skilled and influential bureaucrat in the human rights bureau.

==== Guatemala ====
As Assistant Secretary of State, Abrams advocated for aid to Guatemala under then dictator Efraín Ríos Montt, erroneously stating in 1983 that his reign had "brought considerable progress" on human rights. Ríos Montt came to power via a coup in 1982, overcoming the forces of General Fernando Romeo Lucas García. Thirty years later, Ríos Montt was found guilty of overseeing a campaign of mass murder and torture of indigenous people, genocide, in Guatemala. Ríos Montt, who claimed he had no operational control of the forces involved, was convicted of genocide against the Maya-Ixil population.

==== El Salvador ====
Abrams frequently defended the human rights record of the El Salvador government and attacked human rights groups as communist sympathizers when they criticized the El Salvador government. In early 1982, when reports of the El Mozote massacre of hundreds of civilians by the military in El Salvador began appearing in U.S. media, Abrams told a Senate committee that the reported number of deaths at El Mozote "was not credible," reasoning that the reported number of deaths was greater than the likely population, and that there were survivors. He said that "it appears to be an incident that is at least being significantly misused, at the very best, by the guerrillas." The massacre had come at a time when the Reagan administration was attempting to bolster the human rights image of the Salvadoran military. Abrams implied that reports of a massacre were simply FMLN propaganda and denounced U.S. investigative reports of the massacre as misleading. In March 1993, the Salvadoran Truth Commission reported that over 500 civilians were "deliberately and systematically" executed in El Mozote in December 1981 by forces affiliated with the Salvadoran government. A 1992 Human Rights Watch report criticized Abrams for downplaying the massacre.

Also in 1993, documentation emerged suggesting that some Reagan administration officials could have known about El Mozote and other human rights violations from the beginning. However, in July 1993, an investigation commissioned by Clinton Secretary of State Warren Christopher into the State Department's "activities and conduct" with regard to human rights in El Salvador during the Reagan years found that, despite U.S. funding of the Salvadoran government that committed the massacre at El Mozote, individual U.S. personnel "performed creditably and occasionally with personal bravery in advancing human rights in El Salvador." Abrams said in 2001 that Washington's policy in El Salvador was a "fabulous achievement." In 2019 he said that the "fabulous achievement" was that El Salvador "has been a democracy". In a 1998 interview, Abrams remarked, "While it was important to us to promote the cause of human rights in Central America it was more important to prevent a communist takeover in El Salvador."

==== Nicaragua ====
When Congress shut down funding for the Contras' efforts to overthrow Nicaragua's Sandinista government with the 1982 Boland Amendment, members of the Reagan administration began looking for other avenues for funding the group. Congress opened a couple of such avenues when it modified the Boland Amendment for fiscal year 1986 by approving $27 million in direct aid to the Contras and allowing the administration to legally solicit funds for the Contras from foreign governments. Neither the direct aid, nor any foreign contributions, could be used to purchase weapons.

Guided by the new provisions of the modified Boland Amendment, Abrams flew to London in August 1986 and met secretly with Bruneian defense minister General Ibnu to solicit a $10-million contribution from the Sultan of Brunei. Ultimately, the Contras never received this money because a clerical error in Oliver North's office (a mistyped account number) sent the Bruneian money to the wrong Swiss bank account.

=== Iran-Contra affair and convictions ===
In October 1986, a plane flown by Eugene Hasenfus, carrying military equipment intended for the Contras, a right-wing rebel group fighting against the socialist Sandinista government of Nicaragua, was shot down over Nicaragua. The Reagan administration publicly denied that Hasenfus sought to arm the Contras as part of a US government mission. However, the State Department was centrally involved in the covert plan to fund the Contras, which violated congressional legislation. In congressional testimony in October 1986, Abrams repeatedly and categorically denied that the US government was involved in arming the Contras. However, at the time, Abrams knew that "[Oliver] North was encouraging, coordinating and directing the activities of the contra-resupply operation and that North was in contact with the private citizens who were behind the lethal resupply fights."

During investigation of the Iran-Contra Affair, Lawrence Walsh, the Independent Counsel tasked with investigating the case, prepared multiple felony counts against Abrams. In 1991, Abrams admitted that he knew more than he acknowledged in his congressional testimony, cooperated with Walsh and entered into a plea agreement in which he pleaded guilty to two misdemeanor counts of withholding information from Congress. For failing to cooperate, he would have faced felony charges of perjury over his congressional testimony. He was sentenced to a $50 fine, probation for two years, and 100 hours of community service. Abrams was pardoned by President George H. W. Bush in December 1992.

In 1997, Abrams was publicly sanctioned by the District of Columbia Bar for giving false testimony to Congress about the Iran-Contra affair. Although several of the court's judges recommended disbarment, the court ultimately declined to disbar Abrams over questions related to the effect of Abrams' presidential pardon for his prior criminal conduct.

=== Bush administration ===
President George W. Bush appointed Abrams to the post of Special Assistant to the President and Senior Director for Democracy, Human Rights, and International Operations at the National Security Council on June 25, 2001. Abrams was appointed special assistant to the President and the NSC's senior director for Near East and North African Affairs on December 2, 2002.

Human rights groups and commentators expressed disquiet over his White House appointment owing to his disreputable conduct and conviction in the Iran–Contra affair investigation and his role in overseeing the Reagan administration's foreign policy in Latin America.

The Observer wrote that Abrams had advance knowledge of, and "gave a nod to," the Venezuelan coup attempt of 2002 against Hugo Chávez.

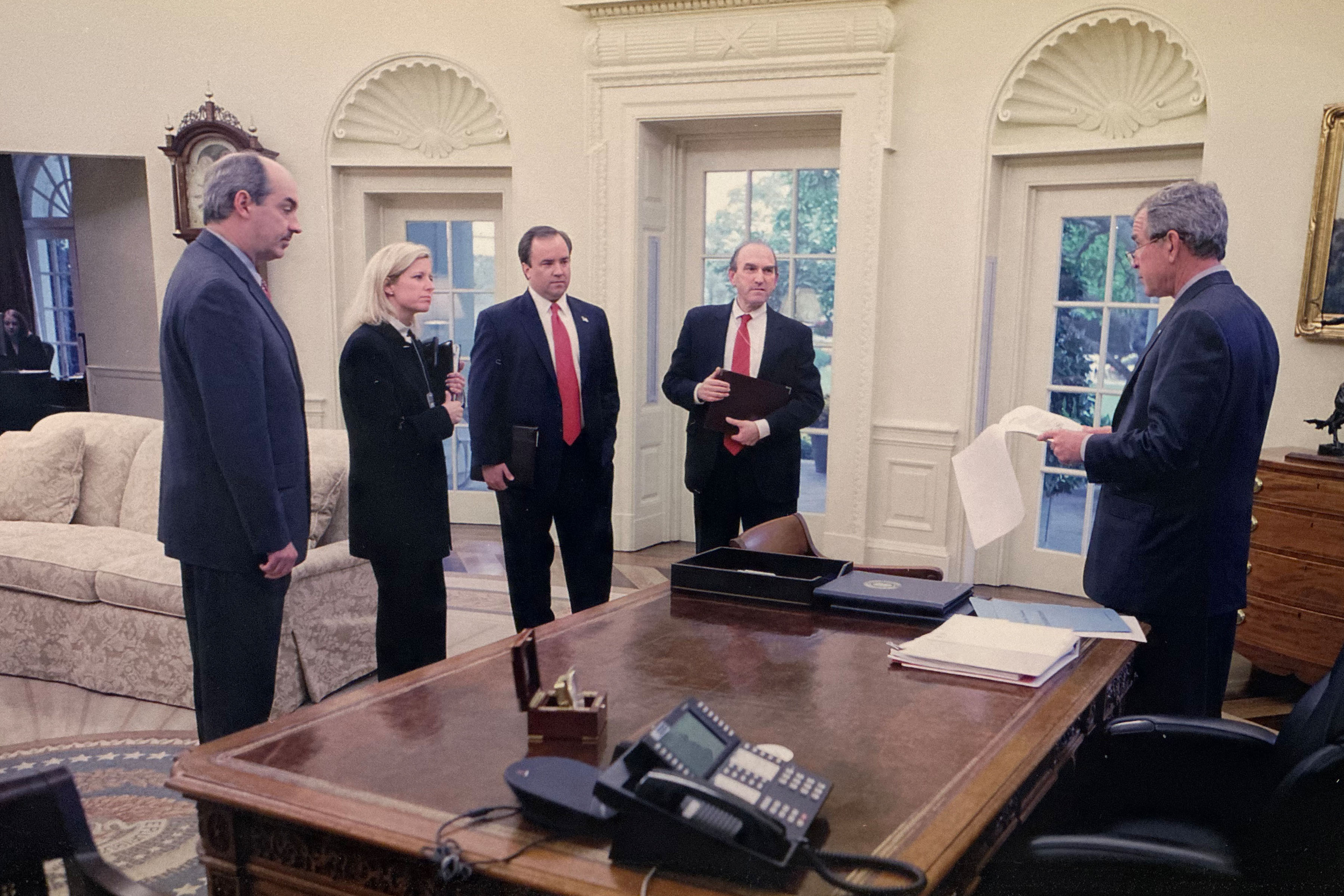
Abrams, JD Crouch, Corry Schiermeyer, and Scott McClellan meet with President George W. Bush in 2005

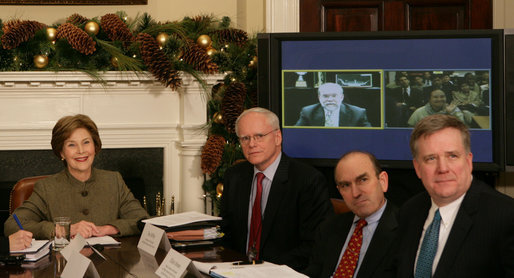
Abrams participates in a video conference on Myanmar in recognition of Human Rights Day, 2007

The Intercept has reported that Abrams had a key role in disrupting a peace plan proposed by Iran, right after the U.S. invasion to Iraq in 2003. Abrams' office received this plan by fax. They should have passed the plan to Condoleezza Rice. But she never saw it. Later, Abrams's spokesperson was asked about the plan and he said “he had no memory of any such fax.”

On February 2, 2005, Bush appointed Abrams deputy national security adviser for Global Democracy Strategy, where he served until the end of his administration on January 20, 2009. Abrams accompanied Condoleezza Rice as a primary adviser on her visits to the Middle East in late July 2006 in the course of discussions relating to the 2006 Israel-Lebanon conflict.

=== Post-Bush administration ===
On May 16, 2016, Abrams wrote a historical piece in The Weekly Standard predicting that Donald Trump would "fail colossally" in the 2016 election to which he drew parallels with the 1972 election.

On December 23, 2016, Abrams, a strong supporter of Israel, criticized Barack Obama for "undermining Israel's elected government, prevent its action against Iran's nuclear weapons program, and create as much daylight as possible between the United States and Israel." Abrams condemned Obama's decision not to block a UN resolution criticizing Israeli settlement building in the occupied Palestinian territories.

In February 2017, it was reported that Abrams was Secretary of State Rex Tillerson's first pick for Deputy Secretary of State, but that Tillerson was overruled by Trump. Trump aides were supportive of Abrams, but Trump opposed him because of Abrams' opposition during the campaign.

Abrams is a senior fellow for Middle Eastern studies at the Council on Foreign Relations. Additionally, he holds positions on the Committee for Peace and Security in the Gulf (CPSG), Center for Security Policy & National Secretary Advisory Council, Committee for a Free Lebanon, and the Project for the New American Century. He is a member of the U.S. Holocaust Memorial Council and maintained a CFR blog called "Pressure Points" about U.S. foreign policy and human rights.

He was on the faculty of Georgetown University.

=== First Trump administration ===
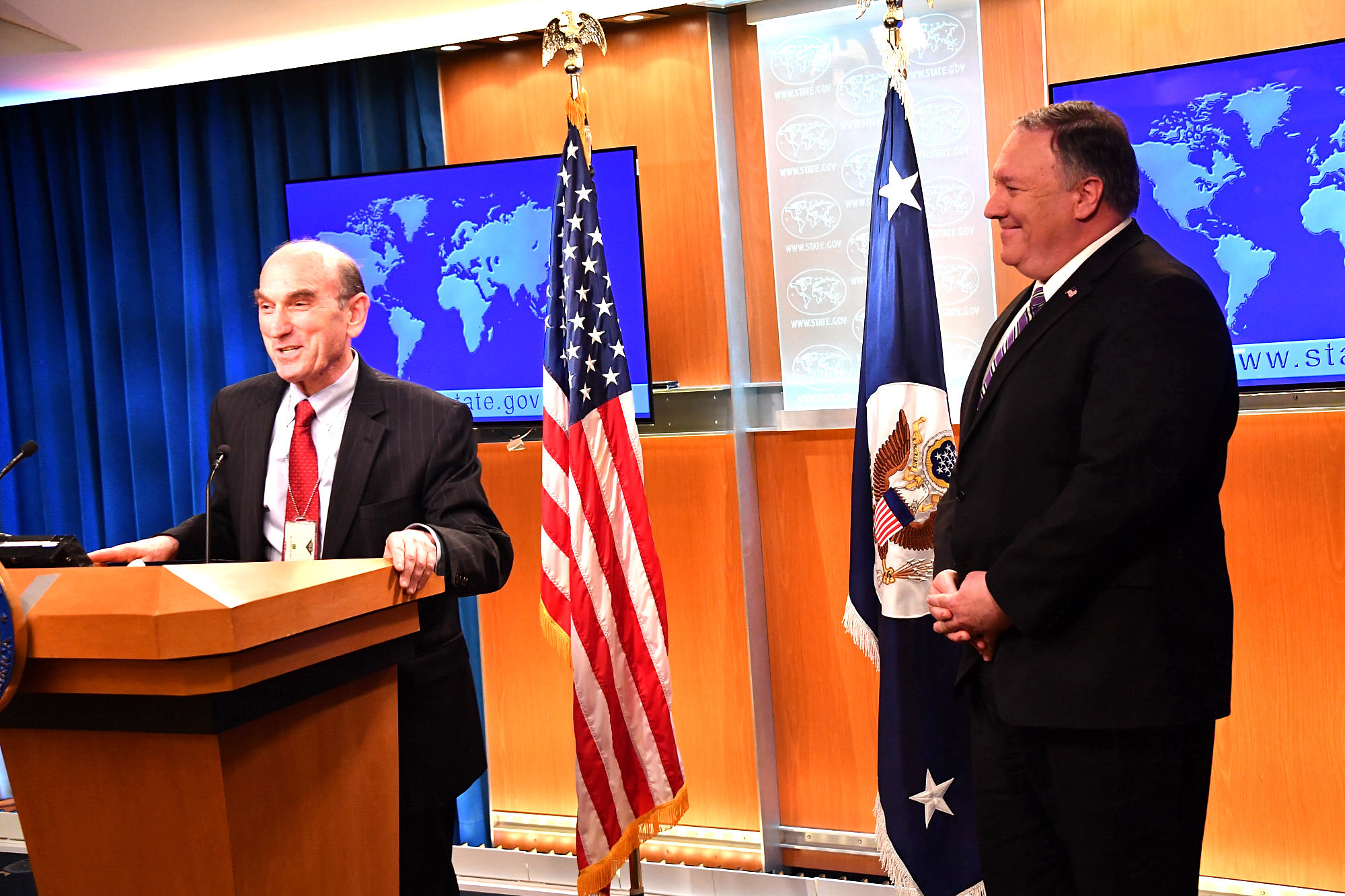
Abrams with Secretary of State Mike Pompeo in January 2019

On January 25, 2019, Secretary of State Mike Pompeo appointed Abrams as the United States' Special Representative for Venezuela. This came two days after American recognition of Venezuelan opposition leader Juan Guaidó as president, thus advocating for regime change in Venezuela.

Abrams's career and record on foreign policy was questioned by some opposition members in Congress. For example, in February 2019, Representative Ilhan Omar of Minnesota questioned whether Abrams was the correct choice for such a role because of his conviction of lying to Congress about his role in the Iran-Contra affair, and his historical support for previous instances of right-wing regime change in Central and South America in the 1970s and 1980s. Omar particularly criticized Abrams's description of the Reagan administration's "record in El Salvador [as] one of fabulous achievement," in light of the El Mozote massacre, a mass killing of over 800 Salvadorian civilians carried out by US-backed and trained "death squads."

Upon the resignation of Brian Hook, Abrams was selected to succeed him as United States Special Representative for Iran. Both positions were merged into the US Special Representative for Iran and Venezuela as of September 1, 2020.

=== Post-First Trump administration ===
In 2021, Abrams founded the Vandenberg Coalition, a neoconservative letterhead organization. The group has advocated for regime change military operations against Venezuela and Iran. In 2022, he was appointed chairman of Tikvah Fund.

On 3 July 2023, Abrams was nominated to the U.S. Advisory Commission on Public Diplomacy by President Biden. The nomination was returned to the President under the provisions of Senate Rule XXXI, paragraph 6 of the Standing Rules of the Senate, on 3 January 2025.

Since the October 7 attacks in 2023, his focus has been on supporting Israel's war in Gaza, along with the need to extend the war to Iran, acclaiming it is one of the primary financial sponsors of Hamas. This is despite the fact that President Biden made it clear that there is “no clear evidence” that Iran was involved in the October 7 attacks – a statement that the Iranian government has also strongly emphasized.

== Political views ==
Abrams is neoconservative and was one of the Bush administration's intellectual architects of the Iraq War. Abrams is also pro-Israel.

Abrams originally opposed Trump's candidacy for president, writing an op-ed in The Weekly Standard titled "When You Can't Stand Your Candidate." Abrams supported Ted Cruz and Marco Rubio during the Republican primaries for the 2016 presidential election. After his time working in the Trump administration, he confirmed that he has continued to believe that Donald Trump was unfit to be president. He agreed with Senator Mitch McConnell's assessment that Trump provoked the January 6 United States Capitol attack.

Abrams gave his impressions of working personally with three different U.S. Presidents, and the differences between their presidential styles, in an interview in 2023.

== Personal life ==
Through Senator Moynihan, Abrams was introduced to Rachel Decter, the stepdaughter of Moynihan's friend Norman Podhoretz, editor of Commentary. They were married from 1980 until her death in June 2013. He has two sons and one daughter.

== Books ==
=== Government ===
- Tested by Zion: The Bush Administration and the Israeli-Palestinian Conflict. Cambridge University Press. 2013. ISBN 978-1-107-03119-7.
- Democracy: How Direct?: Views from the Founding Era and the Polling Era. Rowman & Littlefield Publishers, Inc. 2002. ISBN 978-0-7425-2318-0.
- Abrams, Elliott; Johnson, James Turner, eds. (June 1998). Close Calls: Intervention, Terrorism, Missile Defense, and "Just War" Today. Ethics and Public Policy Center. ISBN 978-0-89633-187-7.
- Abrams, Elliott; Kagan, Donald, eds. (April 1998). Honor Among Nations: Intangible Interests and Foreign Policy. Ethics & Public Policy Center. ISBN 978-0-89633-188-4.
- Security and Sacrifice: Isolation, Intervention, and American Foreign Policy. Hudson Institute. January 1995. ISBN 978-1-55813-049-4.
- Shield and Sword: Neutrality and Engagement in American Foreign Policy. The Free Press. 1995. ISBN 978-0-02-900165-3.
- Undue Process A Story of How Political Differences are Turned into Crimes. Free Press. October 1992. ISBN 978-0-02-900167-7.

=== Religion ===
- The Influence of Faith. Rowman & Littlefield Publishers, Inc. 2001. ISBN 978-0-7425-0762-3.
- Abrams, Elliott; Dalin, David, eds. (February 1999). Secularism, Spirituality, and the Future of American Jewry. Ethics & Public Policy Center. ISBN 978-0-89633-190-7.
- Faith or Fear: How Jews Can Survive in a Christian America. Free Press. June 1997. ISBN 978-0-684-82511-3.

== See also ==
- List of people pardoned or granted clemency by the president of the United States

Political offices
Preceded by Richard McCall	Assistant Secretary of State for International Organization Affairs; 1981	Succeeded by Gregory Newell
Preceded by Patt Derian	Assistant Secretary of State for Human Rights and Humanitarian Affairs; 1981–1985	Succeeded by Richard Schifter
Preceded by Langhorne Motley	Assistant Secretary of State for Inter-American Affairs; 1985–1989	Succeeded by Bernard Aronson
