= Sahar Nowrouzzadeh =

American civil servant

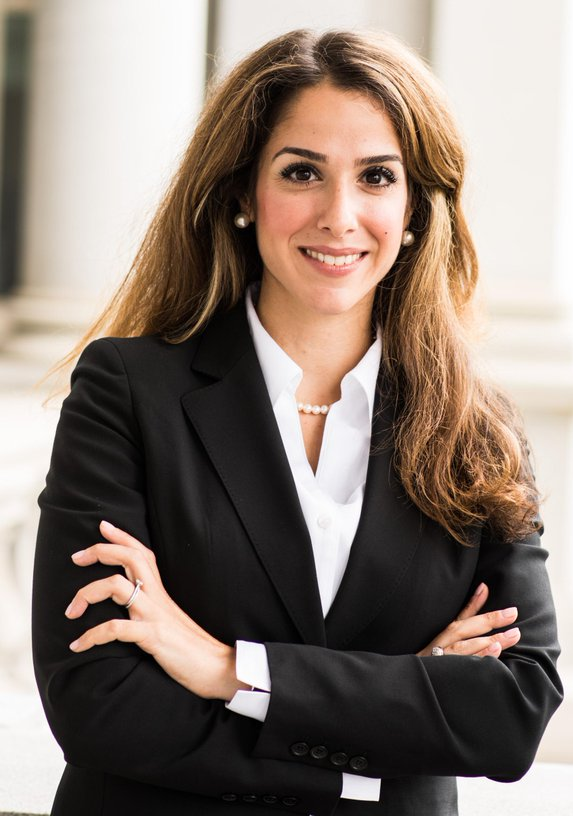
- Born: 1982 (age 43–44); Trumbull, Connecticut
- Education: Elliott School of International Affairs, George Washington University (B.A.); University of Maryland, College Park (M.A.)

Sahar Nowrouzzadeh is an American civil servant. She worked for the U.S. Department of State since 2005, particularly on issues relating to Iran–United States relations, including negotiation and implementation of the Joint Comprehensive Plan of Action.

== Early life ==
Nowrouzzadeh was born in 1982 in Trumbull, Connecticut, to parents who had immigrated from Iran. At the time of her birth, her father was conducting a medical residency at Bridgeport Hospital to become an OB-GYN. As a child, she was not very interested in politics. However, following the September 11 attacks, her interest in Middle Eastern affairs grew. She studied at the Elliott School of International Affairs at George Washington University, followed by the University of Maryland-College Park. She became fluent in Persian and Arabic, as well as Spanish.

== Career ==
Nowrouzzadeh began her career as a civil servant at the State Department in 2005. She was Director for Iran at the National Security Council from 2014 to 2016. She was considered instrumental in the negotiation and implementation of the Iran Nuclear Deal. She is the recipient the State Department Superior Honor Award, a National Intelligence Meritorious Unit Citation and the Secretary of Defense Medal for the Global War on Terrorism.

Nowrouzzadeh gained national media attention in 2017 when she was demoted during the administration of President Donald Trump. In 2019, a State Department Inspector General investigation confirmed that Nowrouzzadeh's demotion was due to her perceived personal political views and heritage. Nowrouzzadeh had previously been the subject of an article in the Conservative Review, a right-wing website that falsely claimed she was born in Iran, and made other false and disparaging comments about her. The article was passed around the State Department. Nowrouzzadeh reported the issue to her supervisor, Brian Hook, but he failed to adequately respond and was found to be among the Trump administration officials who decided to abruptly reassign her.

While on sabbatical from the State Department, Nowrouzzadeh was a research fellow on Iran at the Harvard Kennedy School from 2017 to 2023.
