= Alan Keyes =

American politician (born 1950)

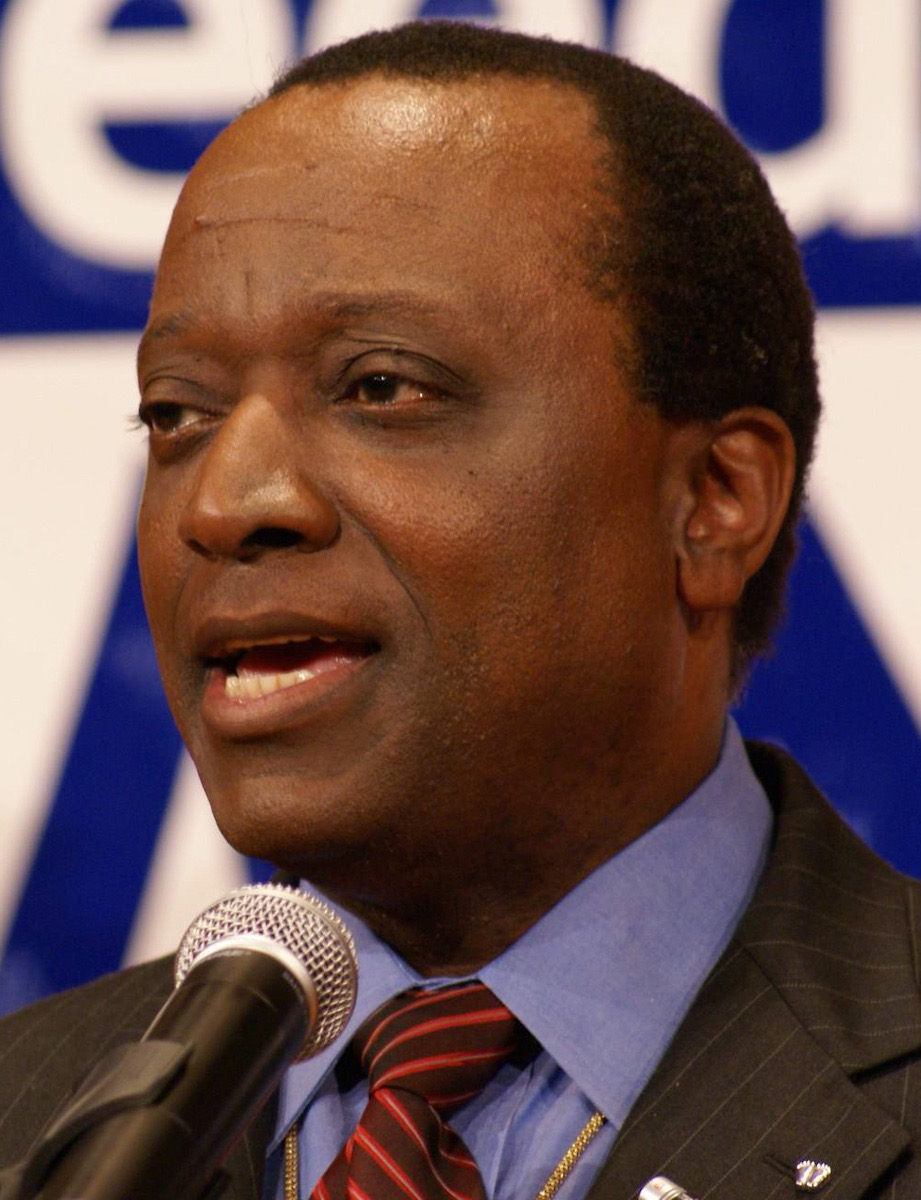
- Keyes in 2015

16th Assistant Secretary of State for International Organization Affairs
- In office November 13, 1985 – November 17, 1987
- President: Ronald Reagan
- Preceded by: Gregory J. Newell
- Succeeded by: Richard S. Williamson

Personal details
- Born: Alan Lee Keyes; August 7, 1950 (age 76) New York City, New York, U.S.
- Party: Republican (before 2008, since 2012); Constitution (2008); America's Independent Party (2008–2012)
- Spouse: Jocelyn Marcel (m. 1979)
- Children: 3, including Maya
- Education: Cornell University (attended); Harvard University (BA, MA, PhD)

Alan Lee Keyes (born August 7, 1950) is an American politician, political scientist, and perennial candidate who served as the Assistant Secretary of State for International Organization Affairs from 1985 to 1987. A member of the Republican Party, Keyes sought the nomination for President of the United States in 1996, 2000, and 2008.

A doctoral graduate of Harvard University, Keyes began his diplomatic career in the U.S. Foreign Service in 1979 at the United States consulate in Mumbai, India, and later in the American embassy in Zimbabwe. Keyes was appointed Ambassador to the Economic and Social Council of the United Nations by President Ronald Reagan and later as President Reagan's Assistant Secretary of State for International Organization Affairs, a position he held from November 13, 1985, until November 17, 1987; in his capacities as a U.N ambassador, Keyes was involved in the implementation of the Mexico City Policy.

Aside from his presidential runs, he was the Republican nominee for the U.S. Senate in Maryland against Paul Sarbanes in 1988 and Barbara Mikulski in 1992, as well as in Illinois against Barack Obama in 2004. Keyes lost all three elections by wide margins.

Keyes hosted a radio call-in show, The Alan Keyes Show: America's Wake-Up Call, from 1994 until 1998 on WCBM. The show was briefly simulcast by National Empowerment Television. In 2002, he briefly hosted a television commentary show on the MSNBC cable network, Alan Keyes Is Making Sense. He is a long time columnist for World Net Daily.

== Early life and education ==
Born at the St. Albans Naval Hospital (now a VA Community Living Center) in St. Albans, Queens, Keyes is the fifth child of mother Gerthina (Quick) and father Allison L. Keyes, a U.S. Army sergeant and a teacher. Due to his father's tours of duty, the Keyes family traveled frequently. Keyes lived in Georgia, Maryland, New Jersey, New York, Texas, Virginia and overseas in Italy.

After high school, Keyes attended Cornell University, where he was a member of the Cornell University Glee Club and The Hangovers. He studied political philosophy with American philosopher and essayist Allan Bloom and has said that Bloom was the professor who influenced him most in his undergraduate studies. Keyes has stated that he received death threats for opposing Vietnam war protesters who seized a campus building. Keyes has stated that a passage of Bloom's book, The Closing of the American Mind, refers to this incident, speaking of an African-American student "whose life had been threatened by a black faculty member when the student refused to participate in a demonstration" at Cornell. Shortly after this incident occurred, Keyes left Cornell and spent a year in Paris under a Cornell study-abroad program connected with Bloom.

Keyes continued his studies at Harvard University, where he resided in Winthrop House. Keyes completed his Bachelor of Arts degree in government in 1972, graduating magna cum laude. During his first year of graduate school, Keyes's roommate was William Kristol. In 1988, Kristol ran Keyes's unsuccessful U.S. Senate campaign in Maryland. Keyes earned his Ph.D. in government from Harvard in 1979, having written a dissertation on Alexander Hamilton and constitutional theory under Harvey C. Mansfield. Due to student deferments and a high draft number, Keyes was not drafted to serve in the Vietnam War. Keyes and his family were staunch supporters of the war, in which his father served two tours of duty. Keyes was criticized by opponents of the war in Vietnam, but he says he was supporting his father and his brothers, who were also fighting in the war.

== Early career ==
=== Diplomat ===
A year before completing his doctoral studies, Keyes joined the United States Department of State as a protégé of Jeane Kirkpatrick. In 1979, he was assigned to the consulate in Mumbai, India. The following year, Keyes was sent to serve at the embassy in Zimbabwe.

In 1983, President Ronald Reagan appointed Keyes as Ambassador to the United Nations Economic and Social Council. In 1985, he was appointed Assistant Secretary of State for International Organizations, a position he held until 1987. His stay at the UN provoked some controversy, leading Newsday to say "he has propounded the more unpopular aspects of US policy with all the diplomatic subtlety of the cannon burst in Tchaikovsky's 1812 Overture." He also served on the staff of the National Security Council.

At a fundraiser for Keyes's senate campaign, President Reagan spoke of Keyes's time as an ambassador, saying that he "did such an extraordinary job ... defending our country against the forces of anti-Americanism." Reagan continued, "I've never known a more stout-hearted defender of a strong America than Alan Keyes." In 1987 Keyes was appointed a resident scholar for the American Enterprise Institute. His principal research for AEI was diplomacy, international relations, and self-government.

Following government service, Ambassador Keyes was President of Citizens Against Government Waste (CAGW) from 1989 to 1991, and founded CAGW's National Taxpayers' Action Day. In 1991, he served as Interim President of Alabama A&M University, in Huntsville, Alabama.

=== Role in the Reagan administration ===
Among the U.S. delegation to the 1984 World Population Conference in Mexico City, Keyes was selected by Reagan as deputy chairman. In that capacity, Keyes negotiated the language of the Mexico City Policy to withhold federal funds from international organizations that support abortion. Additionally, Keyes fought against an Arab-backed UN resolution calling for investigation of Israeli settlements. The measure passed, 83–2, with 15 abstentions and only Israel and the U.S. voting against it. Reagan again appointed Keyes to represent the U.S. at the 1985 Women's Conference in Nairobi.

During his time at the United States Department of State, Keyes defended the Reagan policy of not imposing economic sanctions on South Africa as punishment for apartheid, claiming that comprehensive U.N. sanctions could result in the loss of 2 million jobs for Black South Africans.

== Political career ==
=== 1988 Senate election ===
In 1988, Keyes was drafted by the Maryland Republican Party to run for the United States Senate, and received 38 percent of the vote against victorious incumbent Democrat Paul Sarbanes.

=== 1992 Senate election ===
Four years later, he ran again for the Senate from Maryland, coming in first in a field of 13 candidates in the Republican primary. Against Democrat Barbara Mikulski, he received 29 percent in the general election.

During the 1992 election, Keyes attracted controversy when he took an $8,463 (~$17,409 in 2025)/month salary from his campaign fund.

=== 1996 presidential election ===
Keyes sought the Republican presidential nomination in 1996. In public debates, he asked other candidates about abortion. Many Republican leaders saw this as unnecessary and divisive. Keyes was particularly critical of Clinton during his campaign, saying, "This guy lies, but he lies with passion." He questioned whether a Republican candidate who is truthful, yet cold and heartless, had a chance to win against the incumbent. Keyes was especially critical of Pat Buchanan, once saying during an interview on the Talk from the Heart program with Al Kresta that Buchanan had a "black heart."

Keyes's entry into the Republican race after Buchanan had secured victories in New Hampshire and Louisiana led many to believe that Keyes was a stalking horse for neoconservative elements in the Republican Party, since Buchanan was well known as ardent foe of abortion and had suffered political fallout for bringing abortion and "cultural war" to the center of public policy debates. Later during the primaries, Keyes was briefly detained by Atlanta police when he tried to force his way into a debate to which he had been invited, and then uninvited. He was never formally arrested and was eventually picked up 20 minutes later by Atlanta's mayor at the time, Bill Campbell.

=== 2000 presidential election ===
Keyes campaign logo

Keyes again campaigned for the Republican nomination in the 2000 primaries on an anti-abortion, family values, tax reform plank. In Iowa, he finished 3rd, drawing 14 percent in a crowded field. He stayed in the race after the early rounds and debated the two remaining candidates, John McCain and George W. Bush, in a number of nationally televised debates. He finished second in 8 primaries. His best showing in the presidential primaries was in Utah, where he received 20 percent of the vote. He was also noted for jumping into a mosh pit during a Rage Against the Machine song during the Iowa caucus as part of a segment on Michael Moore's TV series The Awful Truth. Keyes rejected Compassionate conservatism and was for "true conservatism". His rejection of compassionate conservatism was similar of the one of John McCain.

=== 2004 Senate election ===
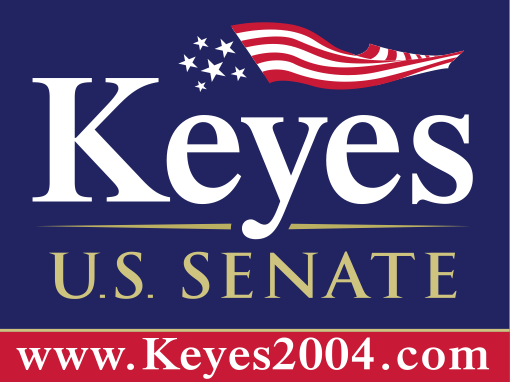
2004 campaign logo

The results of the 2004 Illinois Senate Election: Counties won by Obama are in blue, and counties won by Keyes are in red.

On August 8, 2004—with 86 days to go before the general election—the Illinois Republican Party drafted Alan Keyes to run against Democratic state senator Barack Obama for the U.S. Senate, after the Republican nominee, Jack Ryan, withdrew due to a sex scandal, and other potential draftees (most notably former Illinois governor Jim Edgar and former Chicago Bears coach Mike Ditka) declined to run. The Washington Post'' called Keyes a "carpetbagger" since he "had never lived in Illinois." When asked to answer charges of carpetbagging in the context of his earlier criticism of Hillary Clinton, he called her campaign "pure and planned selfish ambition", but stated that in his case he felt a moral obligation to run after being asked to by the Illinois Republican Party. "You are doing what you believe to be required by your respect for God's will, and I think that that's what I'm doing in Illinois".

Keyes, who opposes abortion in all cases "except as an inadvertent result of efforts to save the mother's life", said in a September 7, 2004 news conference that Jesus Christ would not vote for Obama because of votes that Obama—then a member of the Illinois Senate Judiciary committee and a lecturer in constitutional law at the University of Chicago Law School—cast in 2001 against a package of three anti-abortion bills that Obama argued were too broad and unconstitutional. The legislation, which provided "that a live child born as a result of an abortion shall be fully recognized as a human person," passed the Republican-controlled Illinois Senate, but failed to pass out of the Democratic-controlled Illinois House Judiciary committee. After the election, Keyes declined to congratulate Obama, explaining that his refusal to congratulate Obama was "not anything personal", but was meant to make a statement against "extend[ing] false congratulations to the triumph of what we have declared to be across the line" of reasonable propriety. He said that Obama's position on moral issues regarding life and the family had crossed that line. "I'm supposed to make a call that represents the congratulations toward the triumph of that which I believe ultimately stands for ... a culture evil enough to destroy the very soul and heart of my country? I cannot do this. And I will not make a false gesture," Keyes said.

Keyes was also criticized for his views on homosexuality. In an interview with Michelangelo Signorile, a gay radio host, Keyes defined homosexuality as centering in the pursuit of pleasure, literally "selfish hedonism". When Signorile asked if Mary Cheney, Vice President Dick Cheney's lesbian daughter, fit the description and was therefore a "selfish hedonist", Keyes replied, "Of course she is. That goes by definition." Media sources picked up on the exchange, reporting that Keyes had "trashed", "attacked," and "lashed out at" Mary Cheney, and had called her a "sinner"—provoking condemnation of Keyes by LGBT Republicans and several GOP leaders. Keyes noted that it was an interviewer, not he, who brought up Mary Cheney's name in the above incident, and he told reporters, "You have tried to personalize the discussion of an issue that I did not personalize. The people asking me the question did so, and if that's inappropriate, blame the media. Do not blame me."

During the campaign, Keyes outlined an alternative to reparations for slavery. His specific suggestion was that, for a period of one or two generations, African-Americans who were descended from slaves would be exempt from the federal income tax (though not from the FICA tax that supports Social Security). Keyes said the experiment "would become a demonstration project for what I believe needs to be done for the whole country, which is to get rid of the income tax." He also called for the repeal of the 17th Amendment in order to require that U.S. senators be appointed by state legislatures, rather than being directly elected.

Keyes finished with 27% of the vote and won a small number of southern Illinois counties.

2004 Illinois U.S. Senate Election
Party	Candidate	Votes	%	±%
Democratic	Barack Obama	3,597,456	70.0	+22.6
Republican	Alan Keyes	1,390,690	27.0	−23.3
Independent	Al Franzen	81,164	1.6	
Libertarian	Jerry Kohn	69,253	1.3	
Write-ins		2,957	0.1	
Majority		2,206,766	43.0	+40.1
Turnout		5,350,493	71.3	
Democratic gain from Republican		Swing		

=== 2008 presidential election ===
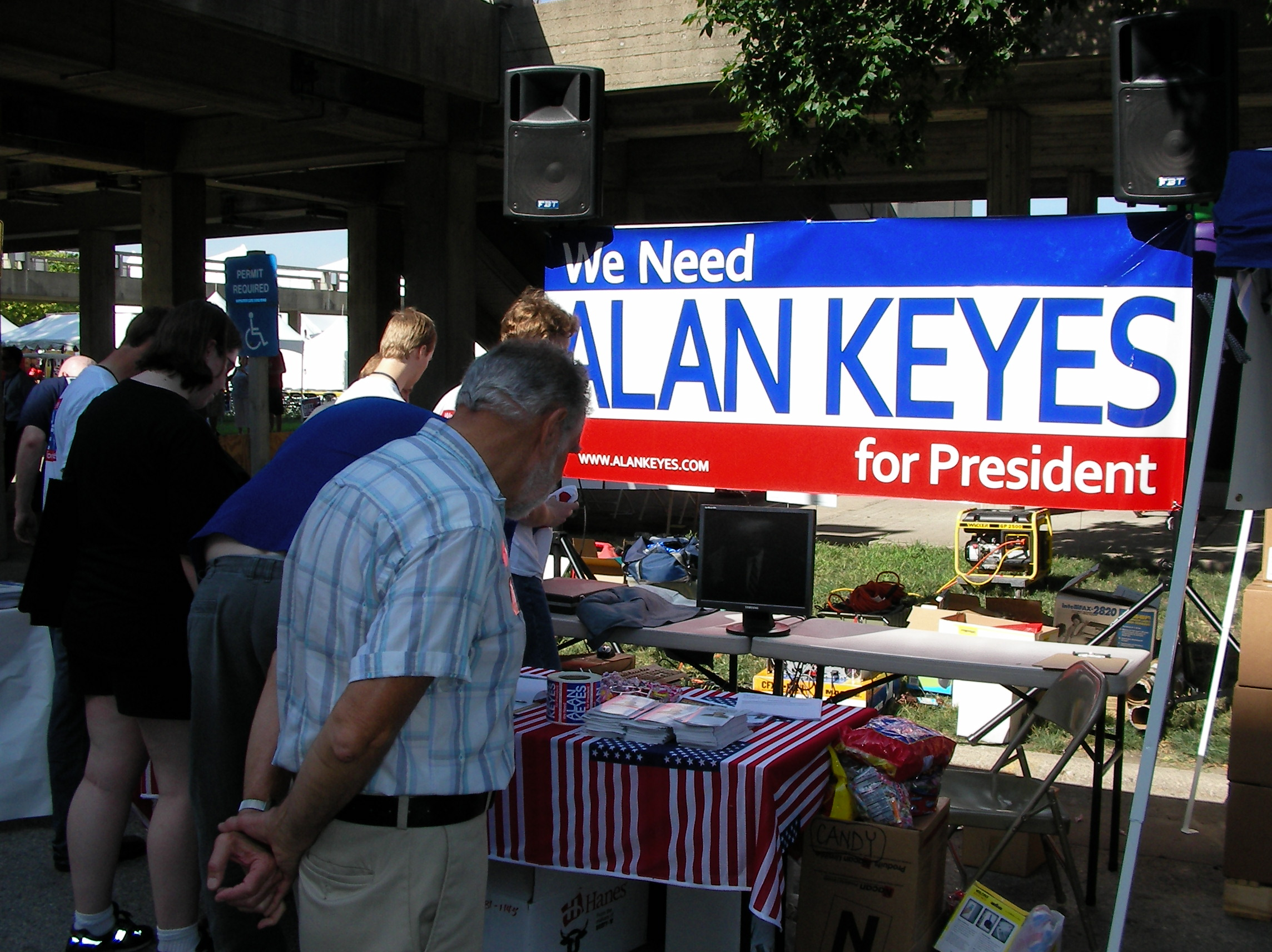
We Need Alan Keyes for President booth in Iowa, August 2007

On June 5, 2007, We Need Alan Keyes for President was formed as a political action committee to encourage Keyes to enter the 2008 presidential election. On September 14, 2007, Keyes officially announced his candidacy in an interview with radio show host Janet Parshall. On September 17, 2007, Keyes participated in the Values Voter Debate streamed live on Sky Angel, the Values Voter website, and radio. In a straw poll of the attending audience, Keyes placed third among the invited candidates, after Mike Huckabee and Ron Paul. Keyes was excluded from the Republican CNN/YouTube debate on November 28, 2007. Keyes's campaign called the exclusion "arbitrary, unfair, and presumptuous," arguing that CNN was playing the role of "gatekeeper" for the presidential election.

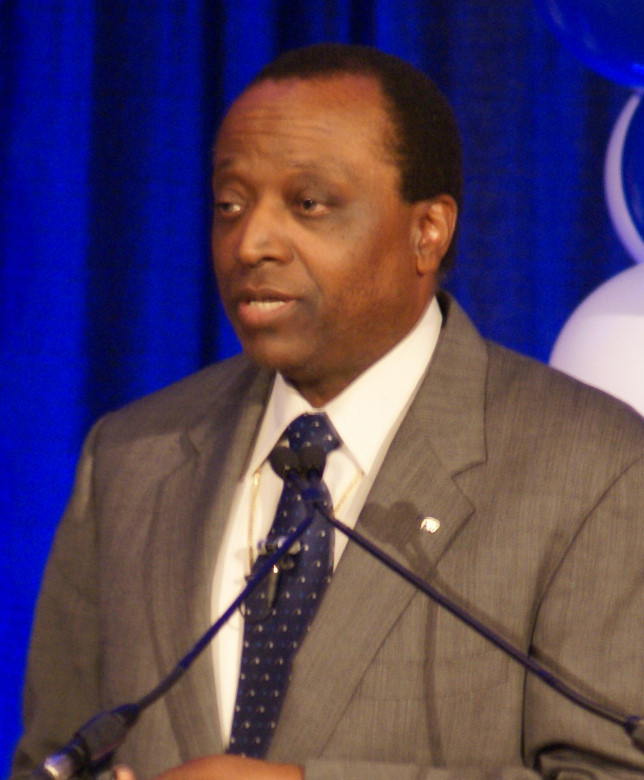
Keyes at a 2008 presidential campaign rally

On December 12, 2007, Keyes participated in the Des Moines Register's Republican presidential debate, televised nationwide by PBS and the cable news networks. This was the first major presidential debate in which Keyes participated during the 2008 election season and the last Republican debate before the Iowa Caucuses. Although Keyes was not listed on the latest national CNN poll leading up to the debate, he registered with at least 1 percent of the Iowa vote in order to participate. During the debate, after the moderator began to ask a question of Texas Congressman Ron Paul, Keyes insisted he was not getting fair treatment. He interrupted the debate moderator at one point, saying that she had not called on him in several rounds and that he had to make an issue of it. He went on the offensive against his opponents during the debate, criticizing Rudy Giuliani's pro-abortion rights position, as well as Mitt Romney's recent change in position on the same subject. In answering a question about global warming, he continued his criticisms of other candidates, saying, "I'm in favor of reducing global warming, because I think the most important emission we need to control is the hot air emission of politicians who pretend one thing and don't deliver". He also advocated ending the income tax, establishing state-sanctioned prayer in public schools, and abolishing abortion. Toward the end of the debate, Keyes stated he could not support Giuliani if he were to win the nomination due to the former New York mayor's position on abortion.

In the Iowa caucuses, Keyes did not appear on any of the election totals. Keyes stated that many of the caucus locations he visited did not list him as a choice. His campaign CEO, Stephen Stone blamed much of this on the media and on Keyes's decision to enter the race late. Stone explained that the media would not acknowledge Keyes's candidacy, making it difficult to run an effective campaign.

Keyes supports an amendment to the Constitution barring same-sex marriage. He stated he would not have gone to war in Iraq, but also said that the war was justified and defended President George W. Bush's decision in one of his 2004 debates. Keyes has stated that troops should stay in Iraq, but also said that he would have turned over operations to the United Nations. However, Keyes has also stated that even while he was an ambassador there he was not a supporter of the United Nations.

After the early states, Keyes exclusively campaigned in Texas, where he finished with 0.60 percent of all votes cast.

Following Texas, the Keyes campaign moved to seeking the Constitution Party presidential nomination, but he continued to appear on several Republican ballots. On May 6, Keyes scored his best showing of the campaign by winning 2.7% for fourth place in North Carolina, earning him two delegates to the Republican National Convention.

Keyes first stated that he was considering leaving the Republican Party during a January 2008 appearance on The Weekly Filibuster radio show. He did not withdraw his candidacy after John McCain won the necessary 1,191 delegates to the Republican National Convention, even though he was no longer campaigning for the Republican nomination. On March 27, 2008, Keyes's campaign website began displaying the Constitution Party's logo, along with a parody of the trademarked GOP logo in the form of a dead elephant. This appeared to be an indication of Keyes's intentions to quit the Republican party and to begin officially seeking the Constitution Party's presidential nomination.

On April 15, Keyes confirmed his split from the Republican Party and his intention to explore the candidacy of the Constitution Party. He lost his bid for the party's nomination, however, coming in second to 2004 CP vice presidential candidate Chuck Baldwin at the party's national convention in Kansas City, Missouri, on April 26, 2008. During the convention, the party's founder, Howard Phillips, gave a controversial speech in which he referred to Keyes as "the Neocon candidate" who "lingered in the Republican Party until a week ago." Following the defeat, Keyes held an interview with Mike Ferguson in which he compared his defeat to an abortion. Later, Keyes told a group of his supporters that he was "prayerfully considering" making a continued bid for the presidency as an independent candidate, and asserted his refusal to endorse Baldwin's candidacy.

Keyes later split from the Constitution Party; he and his supporters then formed America's Independent Party, a faction of the American Independent Party for his presidential candidacy. America's Independent Party gained the affiliation of a faction of California's American Independent Party. However, the AIP ticket, which had Brian Rohrbough, father of a victim of the Columbine High School massacre, of Colorado as its vice presidential candidate, was only on the general election ballot in California, Colorado, and Florida.

In the general election held on November 4, 2008, Keyes received 47,694 votes nationally to finish seventh. About 86% (40,673) of the votes he received were cast in California.

== Media and advocacy ==
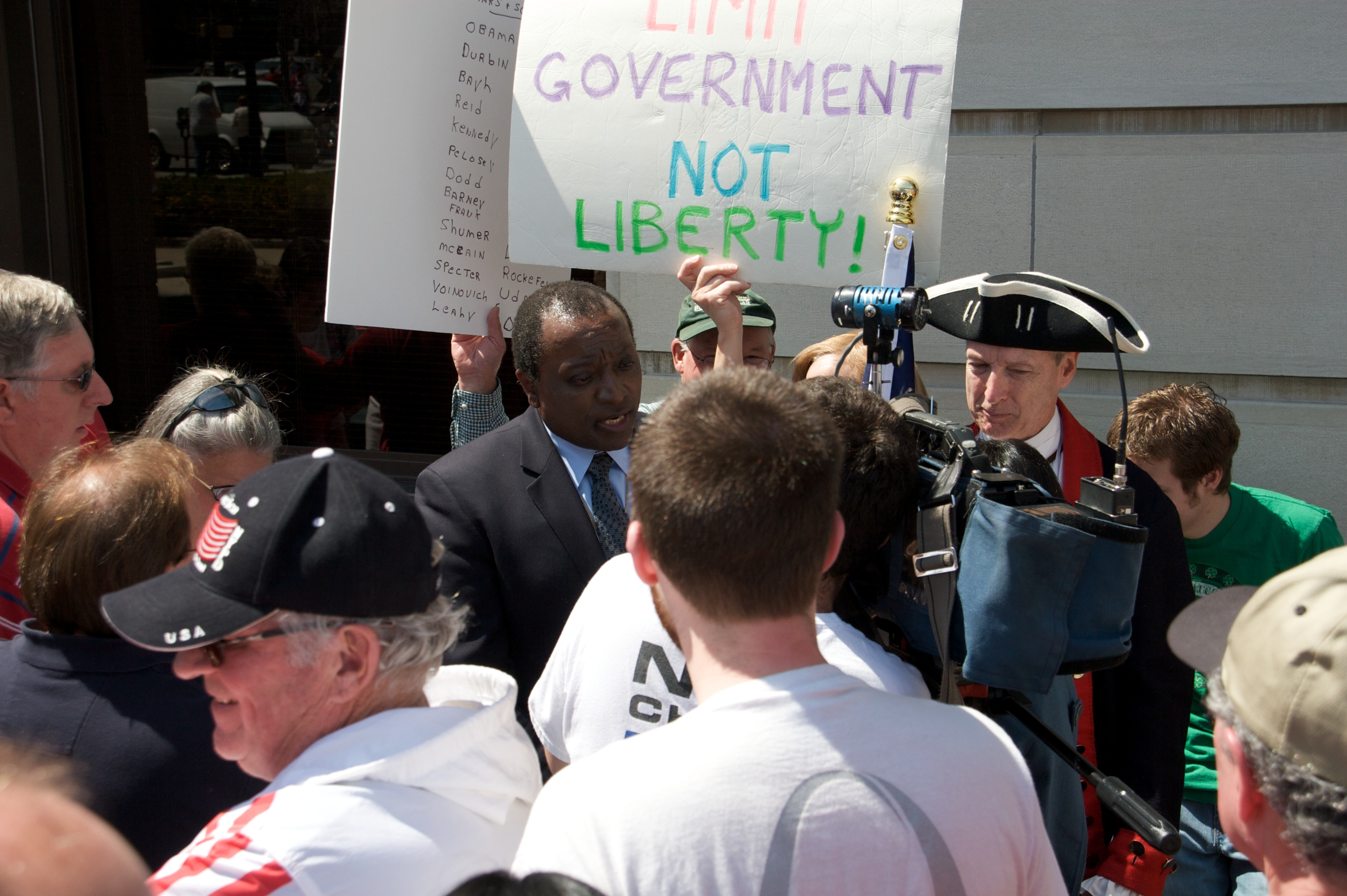
Keyes being interviewed during a 2009 Tea Party rally in Indiana

Keyes has worked as a media commentator and talk show personality. In 1994, he began hosting a syndicated radio show called The Alan Keyes Show: America's Wake-Up Call for Radio America from Arlington, Virginia. The show became simulcast on cable's National Empowerment Television in 1997. Keyes also helped launch various web-based organizations—notably Renew America and The Declaration Foundation.

Keyes has served on the board of advisors for the Catholic League, a non-profit, Catholic advocacy group headed by William A. Donohue. In 1997, he was quoted as calling in that capacity the ABC television show Nothing Sacred "propaganda dressed up as entertainment, the way the Nazis used to make movies. The entertainment elite's belief that there are no moral absolutes deeply contradicts the religious view of Christianity."

In 2002, he hosted a live television commentary show, Alan Keyes Is Making Sense, on the MSNBC cable news channel. The network canceled the show in July, citing poor ratings. The cancellation triggered a boycott led by Jewish education website Mesora.org The show was unsympathetic to supporters of the al-Aqsa Intifadah—whom Keyes frequently debated on the program—and supported the Israeli crackdown on Palestinians. The show also featured critical discussion of homosexuality and of priests accused in the Catholic Church sex abuse scandals. The last episode was broadcast on June 27, 2002. As a result of Keyes's strong advocacy of Israel on his MSNBC show, in July 2002 the state of Israel awarded him a special honor "in appreciation of his journalistic endeavors and his integrity in reporting" and flew him in to meet Prime Minister Ariel Sharon.

In August 2003, Keyes came out in defense of Alabama Chief Justice Roy Moore, citing both the U.S. Constitution and the Alabama constitution as sanctioning Moore's (and Alabama's) authority to publicly display the Ten Commandments in the state's judicial building, in defiance of a court order from U.S. District Judge Myron Thompson. Although the monument was ultimately removed by state authorities, the issue impelled Keyes to spend the next year advocating his understanding of the Constitution's protection of the right of states to display monuments that reflect the religious sentiments of the people in their states. As a result, he published an essay describing his rationale titled "On the establishment of religion: What the Constitution really says."

In early 2005, Keyes sought to intervene in the Terri Schiavo case, arguing that Schiavo's life was protected by the Florida constitution, and that Governor Jeb Bush had final authority to determine the outcome of the case under state provisions. He attempted to meet with Bush to discuss the provisions of Florida law that authorized the governor to order Schiavo's feeding tubes reinserted—something Bush claimed he wished to do, but for which he said he lacked authority—but the governor declined to meet with Keyes. Keyes subsequently wrote an essay directed openly at Governor Bush titled "Judicial review and executive responsibility", days after Schiavo's feeding tube had been removed.

Keyes appeared in the 2006 mockumentary film Borat as an unwitting interviewee of Borat Sagdiyev (a character portrayed by Sacha Baron Cohen).

In November 2006, Keyes criticized Massachusetts governor Mitt Romney for instituting same-sex marriage entirely on his own—according to Keyes—with no requirement or authority to do so under Massachusetts law. Keyes said Romney's actions, which he suggested were due to a complete misunderstanding of his role as governor and of the limitations of the judicial branch of government, were not necessitated by a ruling of the Massachusetts Supreme Judicial Court in November 2003 that directed the state legislature to institute same-sex marriage. The Massachusetts Supreme Judicial court had ruled that the state law banning same-sex marriage was not constitutional. The court gave the Massachusetts Legislature 180 days to modify the law; after it failed to do so, Romney ordered town clerks to begin issuing marriage licenses on May 17, 2004, in compliance with the court ruling. Commenting on the issue, Keyes asked rhetorically, "Since the legislature has not acted on the subject, you might be wondering how it is that homosexuals are being married in Massachusetts. It's because Mitt Romney, who is telling people he's an opponent of same-sex marriage, forced the justices of the peace and others to perform same-sex marriage, all on his own, with no authorization or requirement from the court. Tells you how twisted our politicians have become."

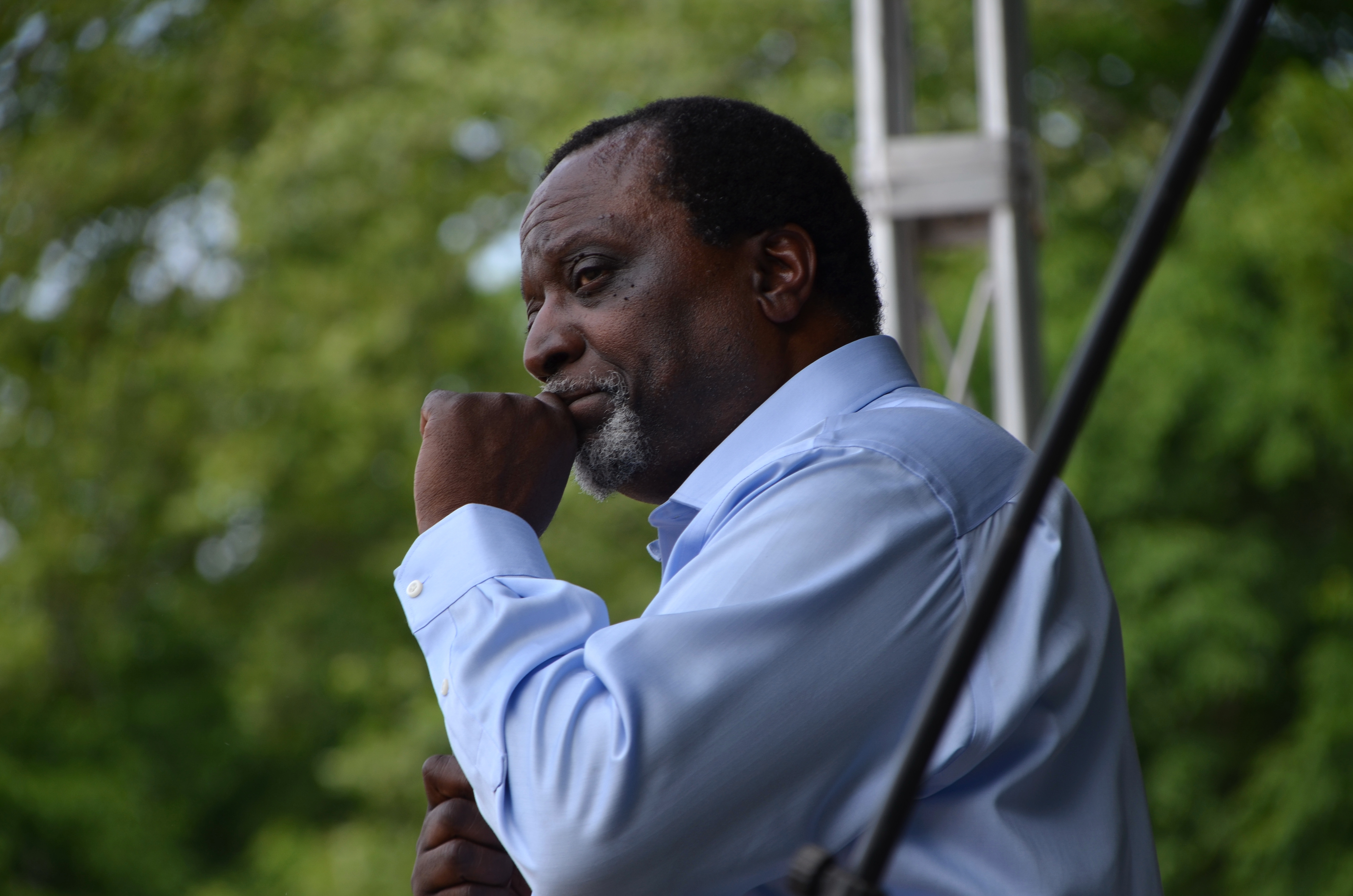
Keyes at a rally in 2012

On May 8, 2009, Keyes and 21 others were arrested while protesting President Barack Obama's commencement speech at the University of Notre Dame. Keyes was charged with trespassing and released on $250 bond. He was arrested a second time on May 16.

In 2010, About.com, owned by The New York Times Company, named Keyes one of the top 20 conservatives to follow on Twitter.

During the time of the 2016 presidential election, Keyes emerged as a strong critic of Donald Trump. He criticized many conservative Christians for supporting "a candidate whose life could be used to illustrate the deceitfully seductive quality of sin summarized in the phrase 'the glamour of evil.'" After Trump's election, Keyes both criticized and praised Trump and various policies he pursued.

Keyes has actively promoted the use of Miracle Mineral Supplement (MMS) in both the United States and Uganda. One of the products featured by Keyes, made by a company called Genesis II, had its sales blocked in April 2020 by a federal court order.

== Personal life ==
Keyes is married to Jocelyn Marcel Keyes, who is of Indian descent and is from Calcutta. They have three children: Francis, Maya, and Andrew. Keyes is a traditionalist Catholic and a third-degree Knight of Columbus. He was also a close friend of Brazilian philosopher Olavo de Carvalho.

In 2005, at the age of nineteen, Keyes' daughter, Maya Marcel-Keyes, publicly announced she was a lesbian. At the time, Marcel-Keyes told The Washington Post that her father had thrown her out of his apartment, stopped speaking to her, and stopped paying for her education. Marcel-Keyes also stated that her family had taken these steps after she attended a demonstration against President George W. Bush and asserted that her father "cut her off" because she is a "'liberal queer'". In October 2007, Alan Keyes contradicted reports that he had disowned his daughter, stating that to do so would be "wrong in the eyes of God." However, Keyes maintained that he would not give his approval to Marcel-Keyes's homosexuality and contended that he must "stand for the truth Jesus Christ represents".

== Obama citizenship lawsuit ==
On November 14, 2008, Keyes filed a lawsuit—naming as defendants California Secretary of State Deborah Bowen, President-elect Barack Obama, Vice President-elect Joe Biden, and California's 55 Democratic electors—challenging Obama's eligibility for the U.S. presidency. The suit requested that Obama provide documentation that he is a native citizen of the United States.

Following the inauguration, Keyes alleged that Obama had not been constitutionally inaugurated, refused to call him president, and called him a "usurper" and a "radical communist". Keyes also claimed that Obama's birth certificate had been forged and he was not qualified to be president.

== See also ==
- List of African-American United States Senate candidates
- List of African-American United States presidential and vice presidential candidates

Political offices
Preceded by Gregory Newell	Assistant Secretary of State for International Organization Affairs; 1985–1987	Succeeded by Richard Williamson
Party political offices
Preceded by Lawrence Hogan	Republican nominee for U.S. Senator from Maryland (Class 1); 1988	Succeeded by Bill Brock
Preceded by Linda Chavez	Republican nominee for U.S. Senator from Maryland (Class 3); 1992	Succeeded by Ross Pierpont
Preceded by Jack Ryan; Withdrew	Republican nominee for U.S. Senator from Illinois (Class 3); 2004	Succeeded by Mark Kirk
Preceded by Michael Peroutka as Constitution nominee	American Independent Party nominee for President of the United States; 2008	Succeeded by Tom Hoefling
