= Assistant Secretary of State for International Organization Affairs =

U.S. government position

United States Assistant Secretary of State for International Organization Affairs
- Seal of the United States Department of State

- Flag of an assistant secretary of state

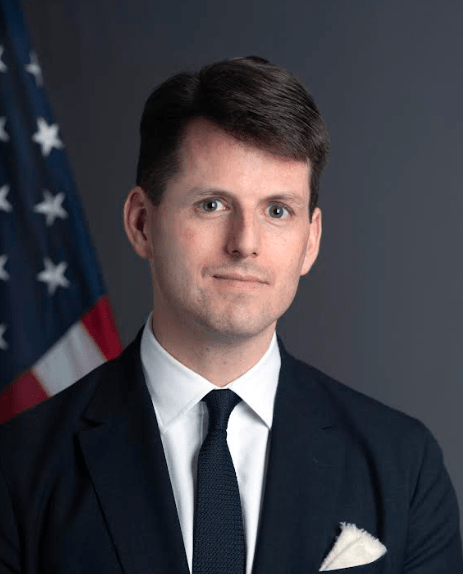
- Incumbent; McCoy Pitt (acting) since January 20, 2025
- Reports to: Under Secretary of State for Political Affairs
- Nominator: President of the United States
- Inaugural holder: Dean Acheson
- Formation: 1944
- Website: Official website

The assistant secretary of state for international organization affairs is the head of the Bureau of International Organization Affairs within the United States Department of State that creates and executes policy in international organizations such as the United Nations. The U.S. Department of State created the position of Assistant Secretary of State for United Nations Affairs in February 1949, using one of the six assistant secretary positions originally authorized by Congress in 1944. On August 25, 1954, a Department administrative action changed the incumbent's designation to Assistant Secretary of State for International Organization Affairs.

== List of assistant secretaries of state for international organization affairs ==
#	Officeholder	Term started	Term ended
1	Dean Rusk	Feb 9, 1949	May 26, 1949
2	John D. Hickerson	Aug 8, 1949	Jul 27, 1953
3	Robert D. Murphy	Jul 28, 1953	Nov 30, 1953
4	David McK. Key	Dec 18, 1953	Jul 31, 1955
5	Francis O. Wilcox	Sep 6, 1955	Jan 20, 1961
6	Harlan Cleveland	Feb 23, 1961	Sep 8, 1965
7	Joseph John Sisco	Sep 10, 1965	Feb 9, 1969
8	Samuel De Palma	Feb 11, 1969	Jun 20, 1973
9	David H. Popper	Jun 25, 1973	Jan 2, 1974
10	William B. Buffum	Feb 4, 1974	Dec 18, 1975
11	Samuel W. Lewis	Dec 24, 1975	Apr 13, 1977
12	Charles W. Maynes	Apr 14, 1977	Apr 9, 1980
13	Richard Lee McCall, Jr.	Jun 10, 1980	Jan 21, 1981
14	Elliott Abrams	May 13, 1981	Dec 1, 1981
15	Gregory J. Newell	Jun 4, 1982	Nov 12, 1985
16	Alan L. Keyes	Nov 13, 1985	Nov 17, 1987
17	Richard S. Williamson	Feb 18, 1988	Mar 19, 1989
18	John R. Bolton	May 22, 1989	Jan 19, 1993
19	Douglas J. Bennet, Jr.	May 26, 1993	May 31, 1995
20	Princeton N. Lyman	Mar 19, 1997	Oct 22, 1998
21	C. David Welch	Oct 23, 1998	Nov 19, 2002
22	Kim Holmes	November 21, 2002	May 1, 2005
23	Kristen Silverberg	August 16, 2005	June 27, 2008
24	Brian H. Hook	October 3, 2008	January 20, 2009
25	Esther Brimmer	April 6, 2009	September 5, 2013
26	Bathsheba N. Crocker	September 19, 2014	January 20, 2017
-	Tracey Ann Jacobson (acting)	January 20, 2017	October 2017
-	Mary Catherine Phee (acting)	December 12, 2017	March 28, 2018
27	Kevin Moley	March 28, 2018	November 29, 2019
-	Jonathan M. Moore (acting)	November 29, 2019	March 1, 2020
-	Pamela D. Pryor (initially acting, later as Senior Bureau Official)	March 2, 2020	January 20, 2021
-	Erica J. Barks-Ruggles (Senior Bureau Official)	January 20, 2021	December 21, 2021
28	Michele J. Sison	December 21, 2021	January 20, 2025
-	McCoy Pitt (Senior Bureau Official)	January 20, 2025	Incumbent
