= Richard Lee McCall Jr. =

American government official (born 1942)

13th Assistant Secretary of State for International Organization Affairs
- In office June 10, 1980 – January 21, 1981
- Appointed by: Jimmy Carter
- Preceded by: Charles W. Maynes
- Succeeded by: Elliott Abrams

Personal details
- Born: May 6, 1942 (age 84) Detroit, Michigan
- Education: Hastings College (BA); University of Nebraska

Richard Lee McCall Jr. (born May 6, 1942) was United States Assistant Secretary of State for International Organization Affairs 1980–1981. Democratic Policy Committee, US Senate

== Biography ==
Richard Lee McCall Jr. was born in Detroit, Michigan on May 6, 1942. He was educated at Hastings College, receiving a B.A. in Biology in 1964. He attended the University of Nebraska from 1964 to 1967, but did not complete another degree.

After college, McCall spent a year working as a field representative of the Teton National Life Insurance Company. In 1968, he worked briefly as a chemist for the Wyoming State Highway Department. Then, from 1968 to 1971, he worked as a staff writer for the United Press International.

In 1971, McCall became a legislative aide of Democratic Senator Gale W. McGee of Wyoming. He held this position until 1977, when he became legislative aide to Democratic Senator Hubert Humphrey of Minnesota, and, after Senator Humphrey's death in 1978, to his widow, Muriel, who was appointed to his seat.

McCall joined the professional staff of the United States Senate Committee on Foreign Relations in 1978, and was promoted to deputy staff director in 1979.

In 1980, President of the United States Jimmy Carter nominated McCall as Assistant Secretary of State for International Organization Affairs and McCall subsequently held this office from June 10, 1980, until January 21, 1981.

McCall later served in the United States Agency for International Development. In the early 1990s, his efforts focused on Somalia and other humanitarian problems in the Horn of Africa. In the later 1990s, he focused on efforts at bringing peace to the African Great Lakes region, including conflicts in and among Sudan, Rwanda, the Democratic Republic of the Congo, and Zimbabwe.

He joined Creative Associates International, Inc., a professional services firm, in 2002, as senior vice president and chairman of its council of senior advisors. His work there has focused on stabilization of post-conflict situations in many places, including Afghanistan and Sudan.

Government offices
Preceded by Charles W. Maynes	Assistant Secretary of State for International Organization Affairs; June 10, 1980 – January 21, 1981	Succeeded by Elliott Abrams
