= Franklin S. Forsberg =

American publisher and diplomat

United States Ambassador to Sweden
- In office January 14, 1982 – December 12, 1985
- President: Ronald Reagan
- Preceded by: Rodney O'Gliasain Kennedy-Minott
- Succeeded by: Gregory J. Newell

Personal details
- Born: October 21, 1905 Salt Lake City, Utah, U.S.
- Died: March 29, 2002 (aged 96) Greenwich, Connecticut, U.S.
- Party: Republican
- Education: University of Utah; New York University
- Occupation: Publisher

Military service
- Allegiance: United States of America
- Branch/service: United States Army
- Years of service: 1942–46
- Rank: Colonel

Franklin S. Forsberg (October 21, 1905 – March 29, 2002), was an American publisher and diplomat.

== Background ==
Franklin S. Forsberg was born in Salt Lake City, Utah, to parents of Swedish heritage. He received his B.A. from the University of Utah, where he was a member of the Pi Kappa Alpha fraternity, in 1930 and his M.B.A. from New York University in 1931.

== Career ==
Forsberg was a teacher at Pace College and New York University from 1931 to 1937, and publisher with Street and Smith Publications in New York City from 1937 to 1942. In 1942 he joined the United States Army, where he rose to the rank of colonel. He helped start the publications Yank and Stars and Stripes. From 1946 to 1948 he was publisher and consultant with Forsberg and Church in New York City. He was publisher of Liberty Magazine in New York City (1948–50) and publisher and consultant with Forsberg, Merritt, Harrity and Church in New York City (1950–55). Forsberg was publisher of Popular Mechanics Publishing Co. in Chicago, Illinois from 1955 to 1959. From 1959 to 1972 he was a publisher with Holt, Rinehart and Winston in New York City. After a career as publisher, Forsberg was appointed U.S. ambassador to Sweden in 1981, a position he served in until 1985.

== Honors ==
Forsberg was appointed "The Swedish-American of 1986" by the Vasa Order of America.

H.E. Franklin S. Forsberg was Chairperson Emeriti of the Swedish Council of America during the years 1991–1994

== Death ==
Forsberg died in Greenwich, Connecticut on Friday March 29, 2002.

Diplomatic posts
Preceded by Rodney O'Gliasain Kennedy-Minott	U.S. Ambassador to Sweden; 1981 -1985	Succeeded by Gregory J. Newell
