= David H. Popper =

United States Ambassador to Cyprus
- In office July 18, 1969 – May 31, 1973

United States Ambassador to Chile
- In office February 22, 1974 – May 22, 1977

9th Assistant Secretary of State for International Organization Affairs
- In office June 25, 1973 – January 2, 1974
- Preceded by: Samuel De Palma
- Succeeded by: William B. Buffum

Personal details
- Born: October 3, 1912 Manhattan, New York, U.S.
- Died: July 24, 2008 (aged 95) Washington, D.C., U.S.
- Spouse: Florence Maisel
- Domestic partner: Olie Rauh
- Children: 4
- Education: Harvard University

David Henry Popper (October 3, 1912 – July 24, 2008) was a diplomat and former United States Ambassador to Cyprus (1969–73) and Chile (1974–77). He was a member and former President of the American Academy of Diplomacy.

== Early life ==
Popper was born in Manhattan, NY, and raised in White Plains, NY. He and his family were Jewish. Popper entered university at the young age of 15 and graduated valedictorian of his class from Harvard University in 1932 and received a Harvard master's degree in government in 1934. He then went on to join the research staff of the Foreign Policy Association, until the United States entered World War II. Popper worked in Army intelligence at a base in Miami where he traced Axis power movement and influence in Latin America.

== Diplomatic career ==
David H. Popper began his career as a diplomat when World War II came to an end. In September 1945 Popper joined the US State Department and was assigned to the then new bureau of United Nations affairs. He had a brief scrap with McCarthyism when he was internally investigated because some past associates and organizations of which he had been a member had leftist connections. He was briefly suspended without pay, but after an investigation that involved interviewing his former Boy Scout leaders, he was cleared.

He served as Deputy Director of UN Political and Security Affairs from 1951 to 1954. He served as Director of the Office of Atlantic Political and Military Affairs from 1962 to 1965 alongside Adlai E. Stevenson, then ambassador to the United Nations. He served as US Ambassador to Cyprus (1969–73) during the administration of President Makarios. In 1973 he returned to Washington, DC, to serve briefly as Assistant Secretary of State for International Organization Affairs for the duration of that year. His next assignment was to be his most prominent.

Popper is best known for having served as US ambassador to Chile during the Pinochet regime. His tenure began in February 1974, four months after General Augusto Pinochet overthrew the democratically elected president Salvador Allende in the 1973 Chilean coup d'état, with tacit support from the US government. In his capacity as chief US diplomat in Chile, Popper was forced to walk the diplomatic tight-rope of balancing concerns of human rights violations by the Chilean military regime with strategic geopolitical and economic objectives of the Richard Nixon and Gerald Ford administrations. The US embassy in Chile once received a cablegram from Secretary of State Henry Kissinger that read "Tell Popper to cut out the political science lectures" in reference to a meeting at which Popper had brought up human rights violation concerns with the Chilean defense minister.

After spending three years as ambassador to Chile he finished his diplomatic career as special representative for Panama Canal Treaty Affairs. He retired in 1980.

== Writer ==
In semi-retirement David Popper served as the ghost writer for former UN Secretary-General Kurt Waldheim's memoirs, entitled In the Eye of the Storm. The book was published in 1986 but printing was soon terminated as Waldheim's past as a Nazi officer during World War II surfaced. The autobiography overlooked those years of Waldheim's life.

== Death ==
Popper died at Georgetown University Hospital of complications from a fall at the age of 95. He had outlived his wife of 56 years, Florence Maisel Popper, who died in 1992. His companion of 14 years, Olie Rauh, had died 5 months earlier in February 2008. He has three daughters, one son, grandchildren and great-grandchildren.

Government offices
Preceded by Samuel De Palma	Assistant Secretary of State for International Organization Affairs; June 25, 1973 – January 2, 1974	Succeeded by William B. Buffum
Diplomatic posts
Preceded by Taylor G. Belcher	United States Ambassador to Cyprus; July 18, 1969 – May 31, 1973	Succeeded by Robert J. McCloskey
Preceded by Nathaniel Davis	United States Ambassador to Chile; February 22, 1974 – May 22, 1977	Succeeded by George W. Landau
