= Iran Action Group =

Dedicated group of US policy-makers

The Iran Action Group was formed on Thursday, 16 August 2018 by United States Secretary of State Mike Pompeo as a dedicated group to coordinate and run U.S. policy toward Iran. Establishment of the group followed the United States withdrawal from the Joint Comprehensive Plan of Action, the nuclear accord with Iran.

== Aims ==
Pompeo introduced Brian Hook, the Department of State's director of policy planning, as the head of the Group at a news conference on August 16, 2018, with the title of Special Representative for Iran and Senior Advisor to the Secretary.

The head of the Iran Action Group, Brian Hook, mentioned that the United States' new Iran strategy is aimed at protecting America's national security, the security of its allies and partners, and to promote a brighter future for the Iranian people.

== Reaction ==
Iran's state TV described the formation of the Iran Action Group at the US Department of State as "an aggressive policy," and Fars news agency (associated with IRGC) named it "the action group against Iran."

According to social scientists who performed searches on international coercion, the group can achieve success "if the U.S. makes its demands clear, imposes costs on Iran that outweigh the benefits of standing firm and clearly and credibly offers a diplomatic off-ramp to end the pressure."

The Middle East researcher and journalist, Igor Pankratenko stated that Washington wants to make a profit of economic issues in Iran by causing the disturbance and emboldening local protests while it appears impossible "that the US would be able to convert these demonstrations into political action."
