= Charles W. Maynes =

American diplomat (1938-2007)

12th Assistant Secretary of State for International Organization Affairs
- In office April 14, 1977 – April 9, 1980
- Preceded by: Samuel W. Lewis
- Succeeded by: Richard Lee McCall, Jr.

Personal details
- Born: December 9, 1938 Huron, South Dakota, U.S.
- Died: June 2, 2007 (aged 68) Chevy Chase, Maryland, U.S.
- Education: Harvard College; Oxford University

Charles William Maynes (December 9, 1938 – June 2, 2007) was a United States diplomat and long-time editor of Foreign Policy magazine.

== Biography ==
Charles W. Maynes was born in Huron, South Dakota, on December 9, 1938. He was educated at Harvard College, receiving a bachelor's degree in history in 1960. He was then awarded a Rhodes Scholarship and studied at Merton College, Oxford, receiving a master's degree in politics, philosophy, and economics in 1962. Maynes was fluent in French and Russian.

Maynes joined the United States Foreign Service in 1962 after graduating from Oxford. Over the next nine years, he served as a Foreign Service Officer in Laos and the Soviet Union. In 1972, he left the foreign service to join the staff of Sargent Shriver, the running mate of Democratic candidate George McGovern in the 1972 presidential election. In the early 1970s, he also served on the staffs of Sen. Fred R. Harris (D—OK) and Rep. Frank B. Morse (D—MA-5). From 1972 through 1977, Maynes was secretary of the Carnegie Endowment for International Peace.

In 1977, President of the United States Jimmy Carter nominated Maynes as Assistant Secretary of State for International Organization Affairs and, after Senate confirmation, Maynes held this office from April 14, 1977, until April 9, 1980. During his time in office, Maynes helped draft agreements that led to the independence of Namibia from South Africa. He also oversaw U.S. efforts related to the United Nations Interim Force in Lebanon.

Leaving government service in 1980, Maynes became editor of Foreign Policy magazine, a position he would hold until 1997.

From 1997 through 2007, Maynes was president of the Eurasia Foundation.

Maynes died of cancer at his home in Chevy Chase, Maryland, on June 2, 2007.

Government offices
| Preceded by Samuel W. Lewis | Assistant Secretary of State for International Organization Affairs; April 14, 1977 – April 9, 1980 | Succeeded by Richard Lee McCall, Jr. |
