= Gregory J. Newell =

American Diplomat (born 1949)

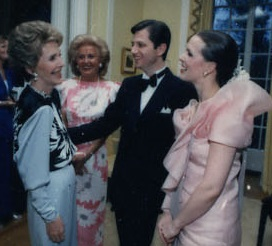
- with Nancy Reagan and Mrs. Newell at Villa Åkerlund, Stockholm, 1987

United States Ambassador to Sweden
- In office 1985–1989
- President: Ronald Reagan
- Preceded by: Franklin S. Forsberg
- Succeeded by: Charles Edgar Redman

15th Assistant Secretary of State for International Organization Affairs
- In office June 4, 1982 – November 12, 1985
- President: Ronald Reagan
- Preceded by: Elliott Abrams
- Succeeded by: Alan L. Keyes

Personal details
- Born: August 30, 1949 (age 77) Geneseo, Illinois
- Party: Republican
- Spouse: Candilyn Jones
- Education: Brigham Young University, Harvard University
- Profession: Former Diplomat

Gregory John Newell (born August 30, 1949) was a United States ambassador to Sweden from 1985 to 1989 and was the assistant secretary of state for international organization affairs when the US withdrew from UNESCO in 1985. He is currently the president of International Commerce Development Corporation.

== Early life and education ==
Newell was born August 30, 1949, in Geneseo, Illinois. Newell was raised in Illinois, Iowa, and California. He joined the Church of Jesus Christ of Latter-day Saints (LDS Church) along with his family in Iowa when he was ten years old. He studied at Brigham Young University's Hawaii campus from 1967-1968. He served a mission for the LDS Church in France and Belgium, afterwards studying international relations and political science at Brigham Young University (BYU). At Harvard, he completed the Senior Managers in Government program. He worked as a planning analyst for an insurance company 1975-1975, and then as a coordinator of evaluation in the language department at the missionary training center from 1977 to 1978.

== Political work ==
Newell began his political career in 1975 as a staff assistant for Between White House assignments Newell worked for Gerald Ford. In 1979, he worked in U.S. Senator Bob Dole's presidential campaign office. He worked for Pennsylvania's Republican Governor Richard Thornburgh as a deputy administrative assistant 1979–1980. He served in the White House as a special assistant to the president and director of presidential appointments under Ronald Reagan in 1981–1982. He was a U.S. assistant secretary of state for international organization affairs from 1982–1985. He was the youngest Assistant Secretary of State.

=== Withdrawal from UNESCO ===
While Newell was an assistant secretary of state, the United States withdrew from UNESCO in 1985. Newell criticized UNESCO, stating that they spent eighty percent of its funds on administration. Newell also criticized UNESCO for supporting "Soviet-inspired" disarmament of countries and favoring the rights of states over individual rights. UNESCO was also criticized for being hostile to the free market and free press. Newell argued that US withdrawal would spur reform fastest and cited the 1977 US exit from the International Labor Organization (ILO) in Geneva as a similar example where an organization changed after the US withdrew from an organization. UNESCO spokesperson Doudou Diene remarked that the US had not submitted any reform proposal or informed UNESCO of any conditions of their membership. Newell stated that the US had made specific requests. The official statement of the US's withdrawal called UNESCO's reforms of the last year "incremental" but not "concrete." Democratic Senator Ted Kennedy praised Newell's withdrawal from UNESCO "as a result of serious problems that plagued that agency administratively and politically."

=== Ambassadorship ===
Newell was United States Ambassador to Sweden from 1985 to 1989. Appointed at age 36, he was one of the youngest ambassadors from the United States. Democratic Senator Joseph Biden criticized Newell's appointment.

== Later career ==
In 1991, Newell was managing director of Nu Skin's international department. In 1993, Newell founded the International Commerce Development Corporation (ICDC), an international business consulting agency.

== Personal life and church service ==
Newell and Candilyn Jones were married on October 2, 1978. They reside in Utah, where Candilyn is the career director of life sciences and teaches a class on professional etiquette at BYU.

From 2011-2014, Newell served as a mission president to the Church's mission in Sweden.

Government offices
Preceded by Elliott Abrams	Assistant Secretary of State for International Organization Affairs; June 4, 1982 – November 12, 1985	Succeeded by Alan Keyes
Diplomatic posts
Preceded by Franklin S. Forsberg	U.S. Ambassador to Sweden; 1985–1989	Succeeded by Charles Edgar Redman
