= Samuel W. Lewis =

American diplomat

Samuel Lewis
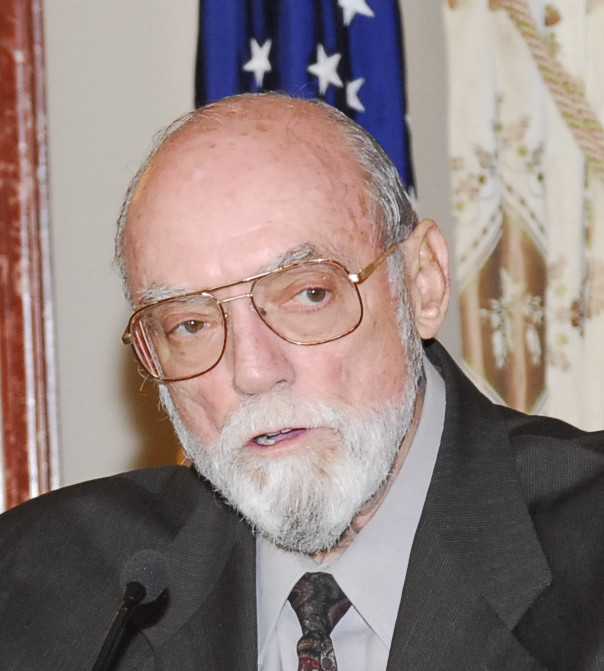

17th Director of Policy Planning
- In office March 21, 1993 – January 21, 1994
- President: Bill Clinton
- Preceded by: Dennis B. Ross
- Succeeded by: James Steinberg

United States Ambassador to Israel
- In office May 25, 1977 – May 31, 1985
- President: Jimmy Carter; Ronald Reagan
- Preceded by: Malcolm Toon
- Succeeded by: Thomas R. Pickering

11th Assistant Secretary of State for International Organization Affairs
- In office December 24, 1975 – April 13, 1977
- President: Jimmy Carter
- Preceded by: William B. Buffum
- Succeeded by: Charles W. Maynes

Personal details
- Born: Samuel Winfield Lewis; October 1, 1930 Houston, Texas, U.S.
- Died: March 10, 2014 (aged 83) McLean, Virginia, U.S.
- Education: Yale University (BA); Johns Hopkins University (MA)

Samuel Winfield Lewis (October 1, 1930 – March 10, 2014) was an American diplomat. During a lengthy career with the United States Department of State, he served as Assistant Secretary of State for International Organization Affairs (1975–1977), U.S. ambassador to Israel (1977–1985) and Director of Policy Planning (1993–1994). As ambassador to Israel, Lewis played a major part in brokering the Camp David Accords between Israel and Egypt. He also headed the United States Institute of Peace from 1987 through 1993.

== Early life and education ==
Born in Houston, Texas, Lewis received a Bachelor of Arts from Yale University in 1952 and an M.A. from the Paul H. Nitze School of Advanced International Studies in 1954. Lewis initially intended on enlisting in the military, but failed his physical exam because of a bad knee.

== Career ==
Lewis joined the United States Foreign Service in 1954 and served as consular officer at Naples. From 1955 to 1959, he was a political officer and acting principal officer in Florence. From 1959 to 1961, he was officer in charge of Italian Affairs in the State Department. From 1961 to 1962, Lewis served as Special Assistant to the United States Under Secretary of State.

In 1963 and 1964, he was a visiting fellow at Princeton University. He served as Deputy Assistant Director for Technical Cooperation at the United States Agency for International Development in Rio de Janeiro, on detail, and in 1966 he was executive assistant to the Ambassador in Rio de Janeiro. In 1966 Lewis received the Meritorious Honor Award and USAID Meritorious Honor Award.

In 1967 and 1968, Lewis was Assistant Director for Development in the Office of Brazilian Affairs at USAID, and in 1968, he became Deputy Director of that office. In 1968 and 1969, he was a senior staff member on the United States National Security Council.

In 1969, Lewis was Special Assistant for Policy Planning in the Bureau of Inter-American Affairs, and in 1970 and 1971, he was special assistant to the Director General of the Foreign Service.

From 1971 to 1974, Lewis was Deputy Chief of Mission at the Embassy of the United States, Kabul. He was Deputy Director of the Policy Planning staff from 1974 until 1975, when he became Assistant Secretary of State for International Organization Affairs.

=== Israel and Camp David Accords ===
From 1977 to 1985, Lewis served as Ambassador to Israel under Jimmy Carter and Ronald Reagan, the second longest tenure of any US Ambassador to Israel. As ambassador, Lewis had a major role in negotiating the Camp David peace talks in 1978 that resulted in a historic treaty between Egypt and Israel.

The Camp David Accords were signed September 17, 1978, and within months, Menachem Begin and Anwar Sadat were jointly awarded the Nobel Peace Prize. A formal treaty between Egypt and Israel was announced the next year, calling for Israel to withdraw its forces from the Sinai Peninsula and placing limits on Egypt's military presence in the region.

== Later life ==
In 2004, Lewis was among 27 retired diplomats and military commanders who publicly stated that the George W. Bush Administration did not understand the world and was unable to handle "in either style or substance" the responsibilities of global leadership. On June 16, 2004, the Diplomats and Military Commanders for Change issued a statement against the Iraq War.

Lewis was a frequent guest commentator on Middle Eastern issues for television and radio. In 2009, he featured in a documentary directed by Harry Hunkele called Back Door Channels: The Price of Peace. Back Door Channels takes its name from the role unofficial back channels of communication, often through third-party countries and private businessmen, played in securing peace between Israel and Egypt. The film included interviews with many original participants in the historic first peace process between the governments, including former U.S. President Jimmy Carter and other world leaders.

In 2011 the United States Institute of Peace dedicated the Samuel W. Lewis Hall.

Lewis sat on the U.S. Advisory Council of the Israel Policy Forum, and was involved in the J Street project. He was also an active board member of the American Academy of Diplomacy.

== Personal life ==
Lewis and his wife, Sallie Lewis (née Smoot) were married for over 60 years. The couple had two children. Lewis died of lung cancer in McLean, Virginia, on March 10, 2014, at the age of 83.

Government offices
Preceded by William B. Buffum	Assistant Secretary of State for International Organization Affairs; December 24, 1975 – April 13, 1977	Succeeded by Charles W. Maynes
Diplomatic posts
Preceded by Malcolm Toon	U.S. Ambassador to Israel; 1977 – 1985	Succeeded by Thomas R. Pickering
