= Joseph J. Sisco =

American diplomat (1919–2004)

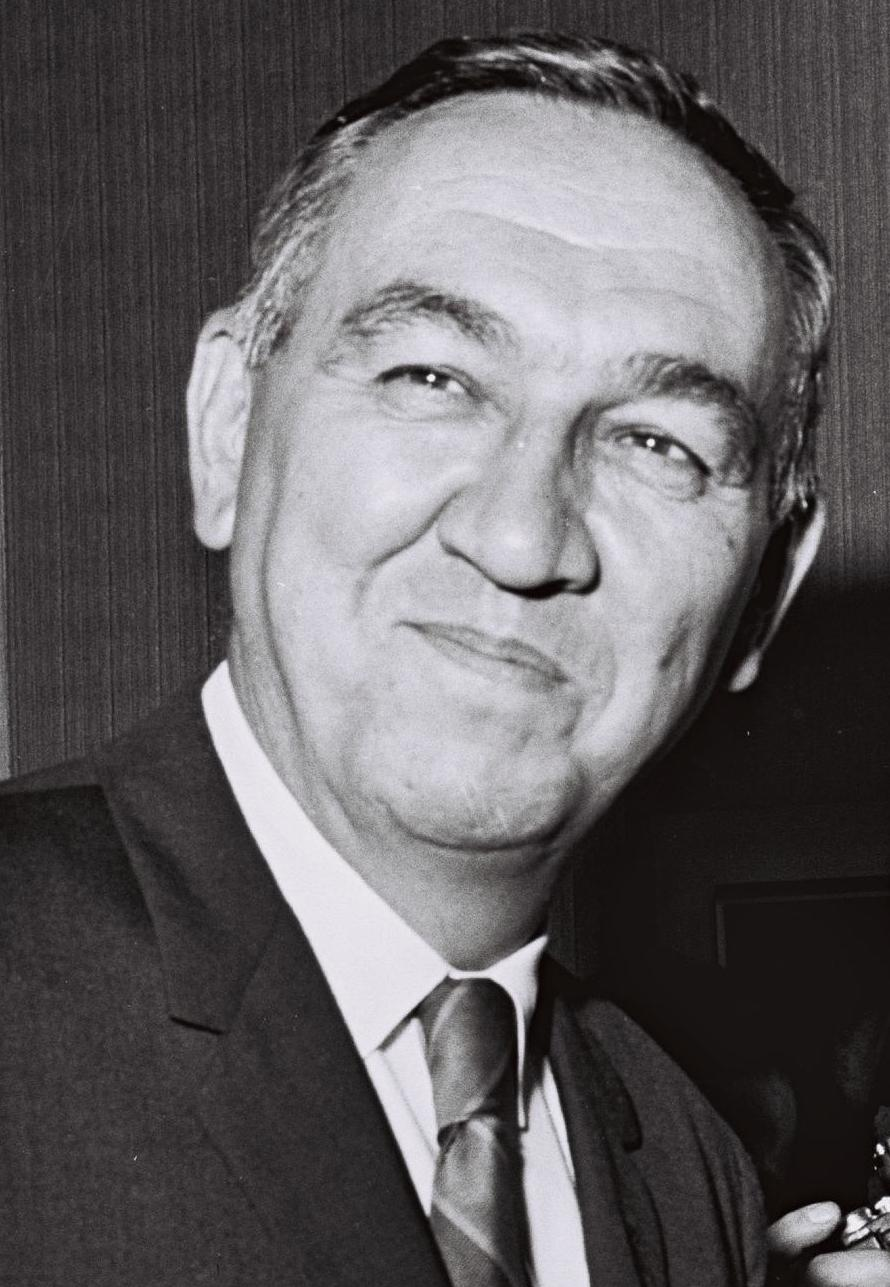

10th President of American University
- In office 1976–1980
- Preceded by: George H. Williams
- Succeeded by: Richard E. Berendzen

8th Under Secretary of State for Political Affairs
- In office February 19, 1974 – June 30, 1976
- President: Richard Nixon; Gerald Ford
- Preceded by: William J. Porter
- Succeeded by: Philip Habib

10th Assistant Secretary of State for Near Eastern and South Asian Affairs
- In office February 10, 1969 – February 18, 1974
- President: Richard Nixon
- Preceded by: Parker T. Hart
- Succeeded by: Alfred Atherton

7th Assistant Secretary of State for International Organization Affairs
- In office September 10, 1965 – February 9, 1969
- President: Lyndon Johnson; Richard Nixon
- Preceded by: Harlan Cleveland
- Succeeded by: Samuel De Palma

Personal details
- Born: October 31, 1919 Chicago, Illinois, U.S.
- Died: November 23, 2004 (aged 85) Chevy Chase, Maryland, U.S.
- Cause of death: Complications of diabetes
- Spouse: Jean Churchill Head (m. 1946; died 1990)
- Children: 2
- Education: Knox College (BA); University of Chicago (MA, PhD)
- Profession: Diplomat, businessman
- Nickname: "Jumping Joe"

Military service
- Allegiance: United States
- Branch/service: United States Army
- Years of service: 1942-1945
- Rank: First lieutenant
- Unit: 41st Infantry Division
- Battles/wars: World War II

Joseph John Sisco (October 31, 1919 – November 23, 2004) was a diplomat who played a major role in then-Secretary of State Henry Kissinger's shuttle diplomacy in the Middle East. His career in the State Department spanned five presidential administrations.

== Diplomatic career ==
Sisco had served for a year as an officer of the Central Intelligence Agency before joining the State Department in 1951, where he served as a foreign affairs officer until 1965, when he was promoted to Assistant Secretary of State for International Organization Affairs by Dean Rusk. In 1969, he was promoted to Assistant Secretary of State for Near Eastern Affairs. He left the government in 1976, and served as the President of American University until 1980.

== Private sector career ==
In June 1980, he joined CNN as a columnist, appearing occasionally on air as an expert on Middle Eastern and Asian affairs.

== Personal life ==
Sisco attended Morton College and Knox College and was a member of Tau Kappa Epsilon fraternity.

Sisco's wife, Jean Head Sisco, whom he married in 1946 while they were students at the University of Chicago, died in 1990.

Government offices
Preceded by Harlan Cleveland	Assistant Secretary of State for International Organization Affairs; September 10, 1965 – February 9, 1969	Succeeded by Samuel De Palma
Preceded by Parker T. Hart	Assistant Secretary of State for Near Eastern and South Asian Affairs; February 10, 1969 – February 18, 1974	Succeeded by Alfred Atherton
Academic offices
Preceded by George H. Williams	President, American University; 1976–1980	Succeeded by Richard E. Berendzen
