= Conservative Review =

American website and brand

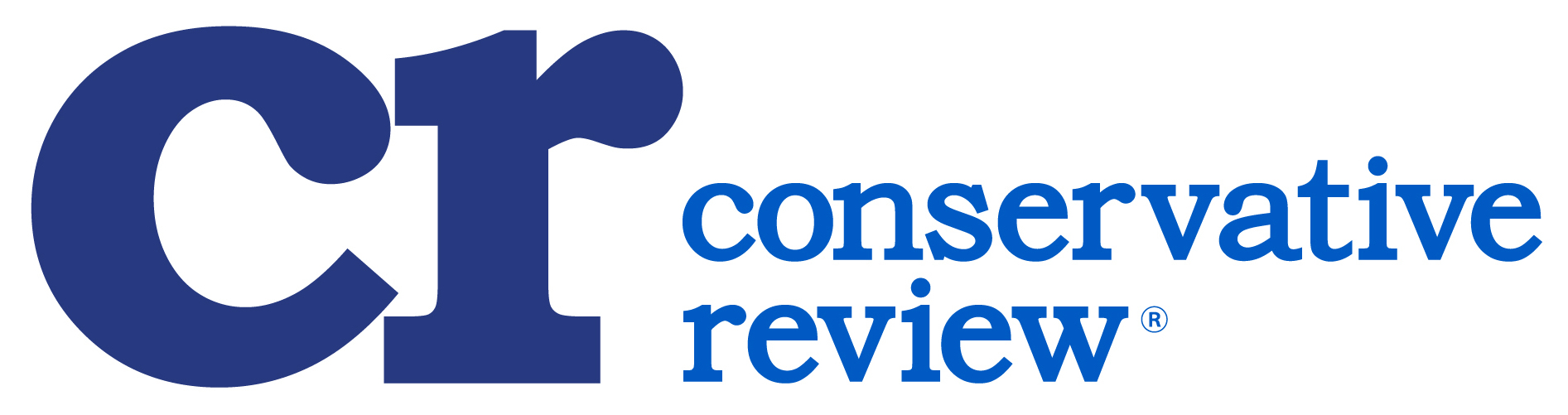
- Abbreviation: CR
- Formation: 2014
- Type: News media Political commentary
- Headquarters: Houston, Texas, U.S.
- Region served: United States
- Editor-in-chief: Mark Levin
- Main organ: Liberty Score
- Parent organization: Blaze Media
- Website: www.conservativereview.com

The Conservative Review is an American website and brand owned and operated by Blaze Media. It was founded in 2014 by a group of conservative political operatives. The site's stated goal is to "cut through the talking points and the smoke and mirrors ... [by employing] two main tools: the Liberty Score and our conservative commentary."

== History ==
On September 1, 2015, conservative commentator and radio host Mark Levin was announced as the editor-in-chief of Conservative Review. After starting his show Life, Liberty & Levin on Fox News Channel, Levin stepped away from his editor-in-chief position at Conservative Review.

In October 2016, Conservative Review announced the launch of CRTV, an online television network, with shows by Mark Levin, Michelle Malkin, Steven Crowder, Mark Steyn, Gavin McInnes, Steve Deace, and Matt Kibbe. Steyn's show was cancelled in February 2017. Gavin McInnes joined the lineup in September 2017, and left in December 2018. Duck Dynasty star Phil Robertson joined the lineup in October 2017. Eric Bolling joined the lineup in summer 2018.

On December 3, 2018, CRTV, LLC – the owner of Conservative Review and CRTV – announced that it had merged with TheBlaze to form BlazeTV and the new underlying entity Blaze Media. The Conservative Review website continues to be operated separately.

== Score and profiles ==
Conservative Review assigns each federal officeholder a grade based on their "Liberty Score", which is a grade based on the top 50 votes that that officeholder has taken in the duration of a rolling 6-year window, rather than just the last election-cycle.

According to Conservative Review, the rolling six-year window is "a more accurate picture of a lawmaker’s performance than traditional one- or two-year scoring methods. Scores are determined by points earned divided by potential points. Voting with the conservative position earns one point; voting against the conservative position earns nothing. Missed votes are not included in a member’s score."

The Liberty Score has apparently not been updated since March of 2023.

== Targeting of foreign policy officials ==
After Donald Trump took office, the Conservative Review was one of a number of conservative media outlets that engaged in a campaign to single out career government employees that they saw as being a part of a "deep state", or "so-called Obama holdovers". The Conservative Review accused Anne Patterson, former assistant secretary of state for Near Eastern affairs, of having "fully embraced the policies of President Obama that aligned with radical Islamic actors and alienated Israel." It said that one State Department official was "leftist", citing as evidence retweets by the official of articles critical of Trump, but ignoring retweeted articles friendly to Trump. Many of the articles targeting foreign policy officials were written by Jordan Schachtel, who had previously written for the far-right website Breitbart News.

In March 2017, the Conservative Review targeted an Iran expert at the State Department named Sahar Nowrouzzadeh, who was involved in crafting the Iran nuclear agreement. One article of this agreement, which had suggested that she was a traitorous stooge surreptitiously working on behalf of the Iranian regime, was then forwarded by former House Speaker Newt Gingrich to an aide of then-Secretary of State Rex Tillerson, with Gingrich writing, "I thought you should be aware of this." Internal emails show that White House staff then proceeded to look into how to fire Nowrouzzadeh, who was hired by the George W. Bush administration, worked nearly a decade in national security, and won awards from the Departments of Defense and State, the Office of the Director of National Intelligence, and the F.B.I, emailed her supervisor where she explained that the article was "filled with misinformation". Nowrouzzadeh noted that she was hired by the Bush administration and that "I’ve adapted my work to the policy priorities of every administration I have worked for." While serving under Secretary of State John Kerry, she often advocated a harsher position vis-a-vis Iran than he did. A Trump administration deputy, Edward Lacey, dismissed her email, saying she was among "Obama/Clinton loyalists not at all supportive of President Trump’s foreign policy agenda." Following the publication of the Conservative Review article, Nowrouzzadeh received death threats. Nowrouzzadeh asked the State Department to publish a rebuttal to the article, but her request was rejected. In April 2017, the State Department reassigned her to the "bureaucratic equivalent of Siberia". Nowrouzzadeh alleged unlawful discrimination, and the State Department later settled with her.
