= Oakcrest School =

Location
- 1619 Crowell Rd. Vienna, (Fairfax County), Virginia 22182; United States; 38°56′59″N 77°18′25″W

Information
- Type: Private, All-Girls
- Religious affiliations: Roman Catholic; Opus Dei
- Established: 1976
- School code: Virtus et Veritas
- Head of School: Christie Keuchel
- Faculty: 34
- Grades: 6–12
- Gender: Girls school
- Average class size: 18
- Student to teacher ratio: 7:1
- Language: Classes are taught in English; Spanish or Latin are required courses
- Hours in school day: 7:50 am – 3:00 pm
- Campus size: 23 acres
- Colors: Green and White
- Slogan: Where girls thrive.
- Sports: Volleyball, basketball, tennis, swimming, softball, lacrosse, cross country, track and field, golf and soccer
- Mascot: Charlie the Charger horse
- Team name: Chargers
- Accreditation: accredited
- Tuition: $33,055
- Website: www.oakcrest.org

Oakcrest School is an independent liberal arts school for girls grades 6–12 located in Vienna, Virginia. It is guided by the teachings of the Catholic Church and the spirituality of Opus Dei. In 2023, Niche ranked Oakcrest School 794 out of 4,990 private schools in the United States, making it the 32nd best in Virginia.

== History ==
In the autumn of 1976, the founding families and educators of Oakcrest started a new all-girls, independent school in a large house on Idaho Avenue in Northwest Washington, D.C., intended to educate young women. The original school had 22 students and six teachers.

In its second year, Oakcrest moved to a former French international school on Yuma Street in Washington, D.C.

Over the next 23 years, Oakcrest established its programs in the D.C., Maryland, and Virginia areas, as well as attracting students from Africa, Asia, Europe, and Latin America.

In 2000, the school moved to the former McLean Bible Church in Northern Virginia. With this move, Oakcrest added a sixth grade class and expanded its athletics, fine arts, and co-curricular programs.

In the fall of 2017, Oakcrest opened the doors to its permanent home at 1619 Crowell Road, Vienna, Virginia. Designed in the tradition of a Virginia manor house, the campus is set on 23 acres and features home athletic fields.

== Accreditation ==
Oakcrest is accredited by the Southern Association of Colleges and Schools, Council on Accreditation and School Improvement and the Middle States Association Commissions on Elementary and Secondary Schools (MSA-CSS). Oakcrest is a member of the Virginia Council for Private Education (VCPE) and the National Catholic Education Association (NCEA).

== Academics ==
Oakcrest offers a liberal arts curriculum spanning the arts, the humanities, mathematics, science, and technology.

The school has a 6:1 student teacher ratio, with an average class size of 15; 83% of faculty hold advanced degrees or postgraduate certificates. Oakcrest offers 16 Advanced Placement Courses and is home to five academic honor societies.

To graduate, all students complete four years each of Upper School-level English, Mathematics, Science, and History and three years of a single foreign language. Students are also required to take Music and Arts Appreciation, Logic and Rhetoric, three years of Theology, one year of Philosophy and four semesters of Physical Education.

All seniors research, write, and defend a thesis paper.

== Athletics ==
85% of Oakcrest students participate in athletics. Oakcrest has an all-female coaching staff and offers 10 different sports. Oakcrest is a member of the Virginia Christian Athletic Conference (VCAC) and also swims competitively in the Washington Metro Prep School Swim & Dive League (WMPSSDL).

Before joining VCAC, Oakcrest was a member of the Potomac Valley Athletic Conference (PVAC) for 30 years before departing in June 2019 due to the PVAC's policy allowing athletes to participate according to their gender identity. The school remains a member of the Virginia Independent Schools Athletic Association (VISAA). Oakcrest won over 50 PVAC banners and was the PVAC Conference Champion for Track and Field in 2019 and Soccer in 2017.

== Campus facilities ==
Oakcrest's 23-acre property includes a three-story main building with a chapel; two academic wings with teaching and advising spaces; classrooms, science labs, art and music rooms; a lobby; a dining/multipurpose room; a library; soccer, lacrosse and softball fields and outdoor grounds. Construction of an athletic center, which will extend from the east academic wing, began in March 2022 and will be completed in the spring of 2023. The two-story athletic center will add a gymnasium, fitness center, and five classrooms to the campus.
