= Allie B. Latimer =

American lawyer

General Counsel of the General Services Administration
- In office September 25, 1977 – August 13, 1986
- President: Jimmy Carter; Ronald Reagan
- Administrator: Jay Solomon; Paul E. Goulding; Rowland G. Freeman III; Raymond A. Kline; Gerald P. Carmen; Dwight Ink; Terence C. Golden
- Preceded by: Donald P. Young (acting)
- Succeeded by: Clyde C. Pearce, Jr.

Personal details
- Born: February 16, 1928 (age 98) Coraopolis, Pennsylvania, U.S.
- Education: Hampton University (B.A.); Howard University (J.D.); Catholic University of America (L.L.M.); Howard University (M.Div., D.Min.)

Allie B. Latimer (born February 16, 1928) was the first woman and the first African American to serve as General Counsel of a major United States federal agency. In her work to bring the government into compliance with the Civil Rights Act, she founded and developed Federally Employed Women (FEW) and worked to end gender discrimination in public sector jobs throughout her 40+ year career. According to the National Women's Hall of Fame, “FEW’s many accomplishments and activities have impacted the federal workplace and contributed to improved working conditions for all.”

== Early years ==
Allie B. Latimer was born on February 16, 1928, in Coraopolis, Pennsylvania and raised in Alabama. She was the daughter of a school teacher and a construction builder. After her graduation from high school, Latimer got her Bachelor of Arts degree from Hampton Institute (Hampton University). Soon after that, she volunteered for two years with the American Friends Service Committee, doing work in prisons and mental institutions. She participated in an attempt to desegregate the New Jersey State Hospital at Vineland and integrate a suburban community outside Philadelphia, Pennsylvania.

Latimer later enrolled in Howard University School of Law and earned her Juris Doctor in 1953. In 1958, she earned a Master of Legal Letters degree from The Catholic University of America Columbus School of Law, and earned both a Master of Divinity degree and a Doctor of Ministry degree from Howard University School of Divinity.

== Religious work ==
In 1969, Latimer became an Ordained Elder at Northeastern Presbyterian Church in Washington, DC. She traveled to more than fifty countries to participate in various church-related conferences.

== Civil rights activism ==
An attorney, civil rights activist and humanitarian, Allie B. Latimer created Federally Employed Women (FEW) in 1968 and served as its founding president until 1969. The organization began as a grassroots effort in support of equality of opportunity for all. To date, FEW has more than two hundred chapters nationwide. FEW's accomplishments have impacted the federal workplace and contributed to improved working conditions for all federal employees as well as providing a model for other workplaces.

An article published in The Chicago Defender in 1973 stated that Latimer “demonstrated professional competence” as well as having “distinguished service to the agency”. An article in The Washington Post wrote that "GSA is now becoming the lead agency in the upward mobility program for women".

In 1977, Dr. Allie Latimer became General Counsel of the General Services Administration (GSA) and became both the first woman and the first African American to serve as General Counsel of any major United States federal agency.

== Awards ==
She received the Foremother Award from the National Center for Health Research in 2005. In 2009 Allie B. Latimer was inducted into the National Women's Hall of Fame.
