= List of ambassadors of the United States to the United Nations in Geneva =

Permanent Representative of the United States to the United Nations in Geneva

Permanent Representative of the United States to the United Nations and Other International Organizations in Geneva
- Seal of the U.S. Department of State
- Incumbent; Todd Steggerda since September 28, 2026
- United States Department of State
- Nominator: President of the United States
- Formation: 1958
- Website: geneva.usmission.gov

The Permanent Representative of the United States to the United Nations and Other International Organizations in Geneva is the Chief of Mission of the United States Mission to the United Nations and Other International Organizations in Geneva, representing the United States of America at the United Nations Office at Geneva. The full official title of the position is Representative of the United States of America to the Office of the United Nations and Other International Organizations in Geneva, with the rank of Ambassador.

The office was established in 1958 by 22 U.S.C. § 287 : US Code - Section 287(e): Representation in Organization. The Representative has the rank of Ambassador and reports directly to the United States Ambassador to the United Nations.

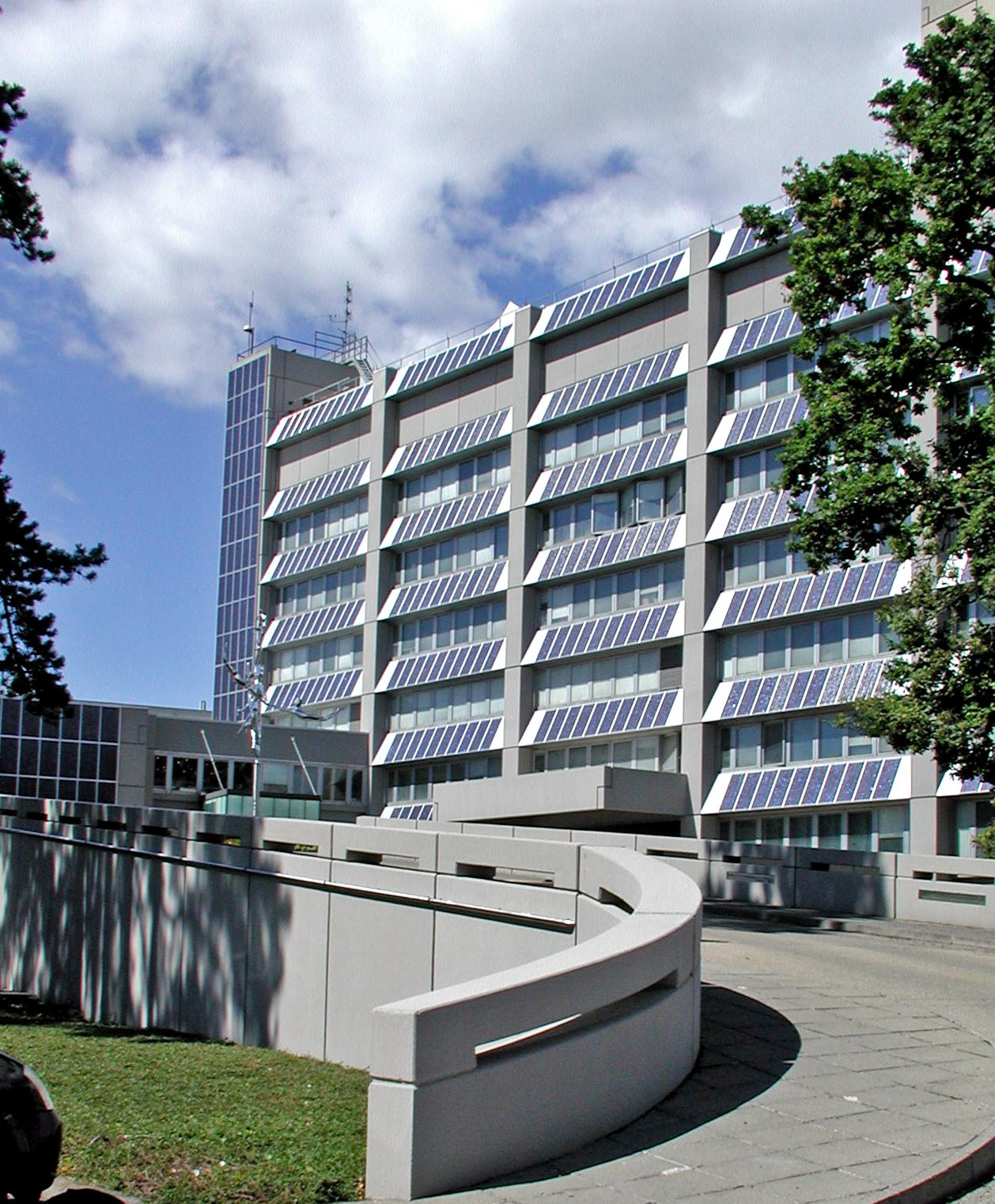
The headquarters of the U.S. mission to the U.N. in Geneva

Formerly, the position was known as the "Representative of the United States to the European Office of the United Nations". The United Nations changed the nomenclature from "European Office" to "UN Office at Geneva (UNOG)" in 1966. Further, Geneva is the home of many UN-affiliated international organizations which are not technically part of the United Nations, as well as many important international organizations entirely independent of the UN, such as the International Committee of the Red Cross (ICRC).

== List of Permanent Representatives ==
References from unless otherwise indicated.

Name	Background	Appointed	Terminated mission
Henry Serrano Villard	Career FSO	June 15, 1958	August 3, 1960
Graham Martin	Career FSO	September 18, 1960	April 15, 1962
Roger Tubby	Political appointee	October 18, 1967	September 24, 1969
Idar D. Rimestad	Career FSO	September 26, 1969	June 16, 1973
Francis L. Dale	Political appointee	December 19, 1973	July 1, 1976
Henry E. Catto, Jr.	Political appointee	July 1, 1976	April 4, 1977
William vanden Heuvel	Political appointee	July 1, 1977	December 5, 1979
Gerald B. Helman	Career FSO	December 6, 1979	October 13, 1981
Geoffrey Swaebe	Political appointee	November 8, 1981	November 17, 1983
Gerald P. Carmen	Political appointee	April 12, 1984	August 31, 1986
Joseph Carlton Petrone	Political appointee	March 12, 1987	July 27, 1989
Morris B. Abram	Political appointee	May 12, 1989	March 19, 1993
Daniel L. Spiegel	Political appointee	November 4, 1993	1996 or 1997
George Moose	Career FSO	November 18, 1997	May 31, 2001
Kevin Moley	Political appointee	October 1, 2001	April 30, 2006
Warren W. Tichenor	Political appointee	May 30, 2006	January 20, 2009
Betty E. King	Political appointee	April 2, 2010	November 2, 2013
Pamela Hamamoto	Political appointee	May 12, 2014; Presentation of credentials June 26, 2014	January 20, 2017
Andrew Bremberg	Political appointee	October 22, 2019; Presentation of credentials November 12, 2019	January 20, 2021
Bathsheba Nell Crocker	Political appointee	June 24, 2021; Presentation of credentials January 18, 2022	January 20, 2025
Todd Steggerda	Political appointee	August 7, 2026; Presentation of credentials September 28, 2026	Present
