= William vanden Heuvel =

American attorney, businessman, and diplomat (1930–2021)

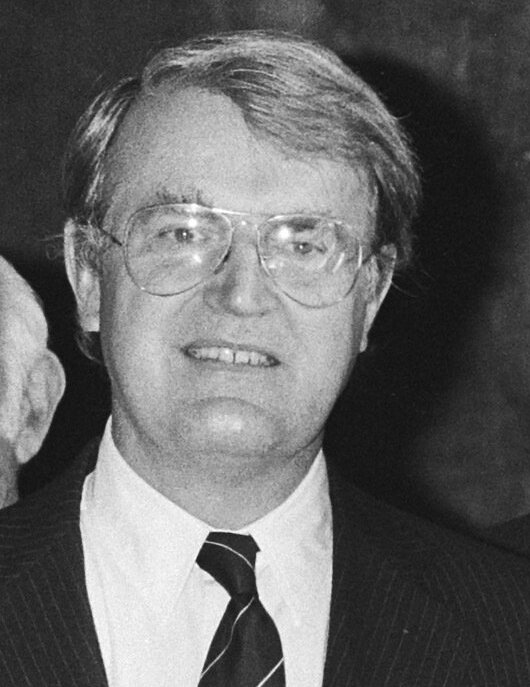
- Vanden Heuvel in 1982

Representative of the United States to the European Office of the United Nations
- In office July 1, 1977 — December 5, 1979
- President: Jimmy Carter
- Preceded by: Henry E. Catto Jr.
- Succeeded by: Gerald B. Helman

Personal details
- Born: William Jacobus vanden Heuvel; April 14, 1930 Rochester, New York, U.S.
- Died: June 15, 2021 (aged 91) Manhattan, New York, U.S.
- Party: Democratic
- Spouses: Jean Stein (m. 1958; div. 1969); Melinda Fuller Pierce (m. 1979)
- Children: 4, including Katrina
- Education: Deep Springs College; Cornell University (BA, JD)

William Jacobus vanden Heuvel (/ˈvæn.dɛnˈhjuː.vəl/ VAN-den-HYOO-vul; April 14, 1930 – June 15, 2021) was an American attorney, businessman, author and diplomat of Dutch descent. He was known for advising Robert F. Kennedy during the latter's campaigns for Senate in 1964 and president in 1968. Vanden Heuvel established the Roosevelt Institute in 1987. He was the father of longtime editor of The Nation magazine Katrina vanden Heuvel and actress Wendy vanden Heuvel, children from his marriage to author-editor Jean Stein, the daughter of MCA founder Jules C. Stein.

== Early life and education ==
Vanden Heuvel was born in Rochester, New York, on April 14, 1930. His father, Joost, immigrated to the United States from the Netherlands and worked at an R.T. French Company factory; his mother, Alberta (Demunter), immigrated from Belgium. He attended public schools in New York. He attended Deep Springs College (Deep Springs does not "graduate" attendees) and graduated from Cornell University, where he was a member of the Cornell Branch of the Telluride Association. While a student at Cornell Law School, he was editor-in-chief of the Cornell Law Review, served as president of the Young Democrats and Debate Club, and was elected to the Tompkins County Board of Commissioners. He was admitted to the New York Bar in 1952, and then joined the law firm of Donovan, Leisure, Newton & Irvine as an associate.

== Career ==
An early protégé of Office of Strategic Services founder William J. Donovan, vanden Heuvel served at the U.S. embassy (1953–1954) in Bangkok, Thailand, as Donovan's executive assistant during his ambassadorship. In 1958, vanden Heuvel served as special counsel to New York State Governor W. Averell Harriman. Heuvel was a member of the Citizens Committee for a Free Cuba, set up in 1963.

Vanden Heuvel became U.S. Attorney General Robert F. Kennedy's assistant in 1962, and was involved in Kennedy's 1964 and 1968 political campaigns. As special assistant to Attorney General Kennedy, vanden Heuvel played the key role in court, orchestrating the desegregation of the Prince Edward County school system, which expanded the scope of the landmark decision, Brown v. Board of Education.

In 1965, vanden Heuvel joined Stroock & Stroock & Lavan as senior partner, where he practiced international and corporate law. In the 1970s, vanden Heuvel, as Chairman of the New York City Board of Corrections, led a campaign to investigate conditions in the city's prison system. He subsequently served as U.S. Ambassador to the European office of the United Nations in Geneva (1977–79) and United States Deputy Ambassador to the United Nations (1979–1981) during the Carter administration.

Vanden Heuvel founded the Roosevelt Institute in 1987 and served as its chairman until the early 2000s. He was a Senior Advisor to the investment banking firm Allen & Company starting in 1984. He also served as chairman of the American Austrian Foundation. He acted as co-chairman of the Council of American Ambassadors, and was a member of the Council on Foreign Relations. He was a governor and former chairman of the United Nations Association of the United States of America, and wrote extensively on the United Nations and American foreign policy. He was also a member of Collegium International, an organization of leaders with political, scientific, and ethical expertise whose goal is to provide new approaches in overcoming the obstacles in the way of a peaceful, socially just and an economically sustainable world.

== Political campaigns ==
In 1960, vanden Heuvel ran as a Democrat for New York's 17th congressional district against incumbent Republican John Lindsay. The 17th district was strongly identified with the Upper East Side of Manhattan, which has been often referred to as the "Silk Stocking" district. Lindsay handily won the highly contested race by 80,000 votes to vanden Heuvel's 54,000.

In June 1973, vanden Heuvel challenged Frank Hogan in the Democratic primary for the position of Manhattan District Attorney. Hogan had served for 32 years in the position and easily won the primary, assuring Hogan victory in the general election in November, with the support of all the political parties.

== Personal life ==
Vanden Heuvel married his first wife, Jean Stein, in 1958. Together, they had two children: Katrina and Wendy. They divorced in 1969. A decade later, he married Melinda Fuller Pierce. They remained married until his death. Vanden Heuvel died on June 15, 2021, at his home in Manhattan. He was 91, and suffered from complications of pneumonia prior to his death.

== Books ==
- William vanden Heuvel, editor. The Future of Freedom in Russia, Templeton Foundation Press (2000), ISBN 1-890151-43-2.
- William vanden Heuvel, with Milton S. Gwirtzman. On His Own: Robert F. Kennedy, 1964–1968, Doubleday (1970), OCLC 67339.
- William vanden Heuvel. Hope and History: A Memoir of Tumultuous Times, Cornell University Press (2019), ISBN 9781501738197.
