= Bureau of International Organization Affairs =

U.S. State Department division

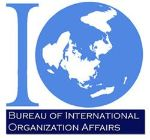
- Logo of the Bureau of International Organization Affairs

Bureau overview
- Formed: June 24, 1949; 77 years ago
- Jurisdiction: Executive branch of the United States
- Employees: 434 (As of 2015)
- Annual budget: $3.5 billion (FY 2014)
- Bureau executive: McCoy Pitt (Acting), Assistant Secretary of State for International Organization Affairs
- Parent department: U.S. Department of State
- Website: state.gov/io

The Bureau of International Organization Affairs (IO) is a bureau in the United States Department of State that creates and executes U.S. policy in the United Nations and other international organizations. It is headed by the Assistant Secretary of State for International Organization Affairs. The IO is charged with developing and implementing the policies of the U.S. government with respect to the United Nations and its affiliated agencies, as well as within certain other international organizations. The Bureau of International Organization Affairs was created in order to strengthen the United States involvement in important international relations.

== History ==
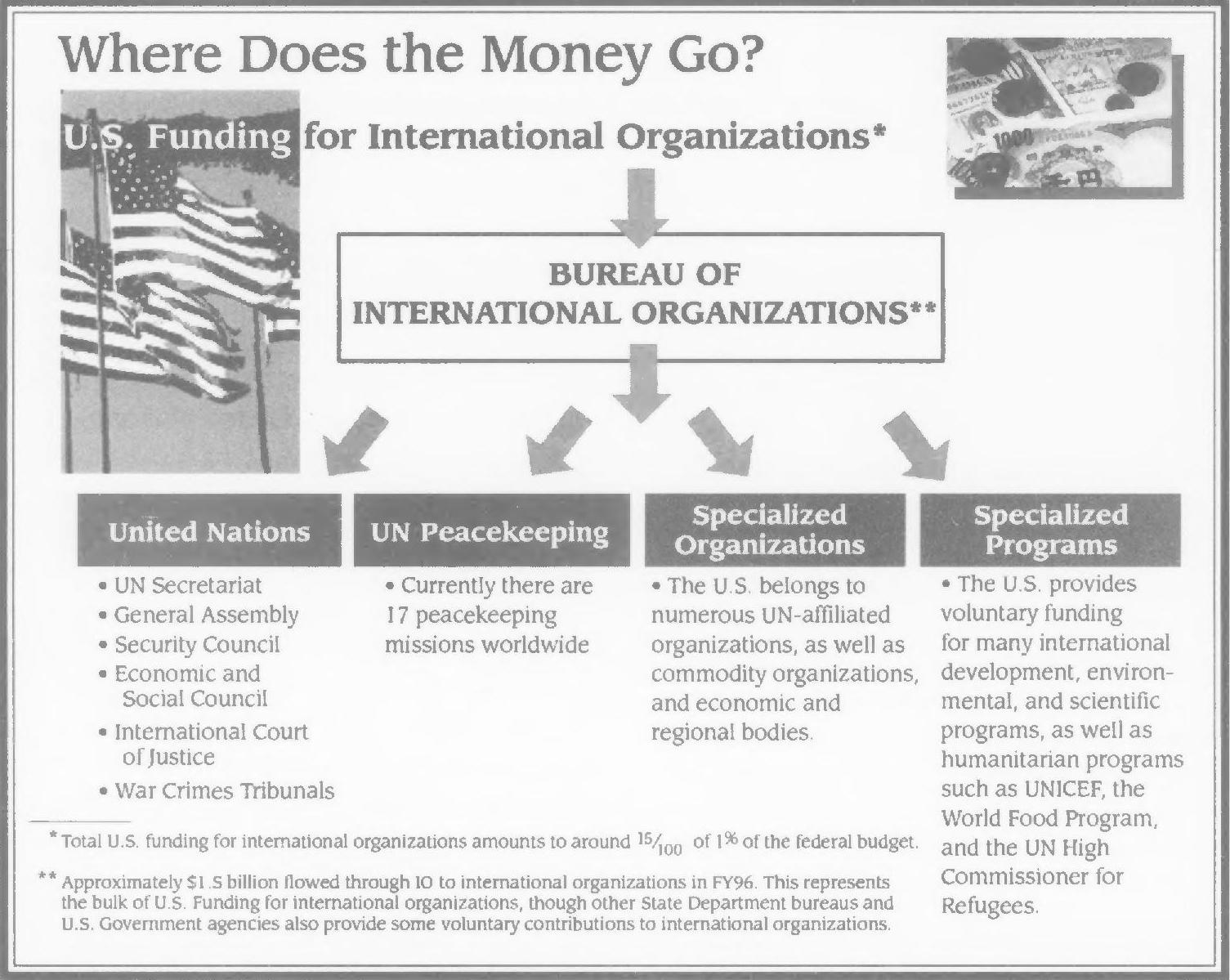
Chart from the March 1997 issue of State Magazine showing the flow of funds through the IO

The bureau was created under the U.S. government in order to assess the successes and failures of the United States involvement in the UNESCO organization. For nearly three years prior to the decision to withdraw, the State Department, under the specific guidance of the Bureau of International Organization Affairs, had been reevaluating the effectiveness of multilateral organizations in which the United States was a member, and identifying the particular interests of the United States. As a result, the Bureau of International Organization Affairs stated that the United States involvement in UNESCO was unnecessary and the United States followed through on their decision to withdrawal.

“The Bureau of International Organization Affairs is responsible for developing the U.S. position on all subjects that come before international bodies, for preparing and laying before the missions, or delegations concerned, the instructions of the President, as to what they will do and how they will report and what positions they will take on the various issues that come up.” ...from the Structure and Functions of the Bureau of International Organization Affairs, Department, United States Congress, House Committee on Foreign Affairs. The Bureau of International Organization Affairs has grown in size since its feeble beginnings. The Bureau of International Organization Affairs was initially created to aid in the United States withdrawal from the organization UNESCO, (United Nations Educational, Scientific, and Cultural Organization). “The bureau concluded that UNESCO's performance has been much less satisfactory than that of other multilateral organizations. To augment its preliminary findings, the bureau carried out an in-depth policy review on UNESCO beginning in August 1983. The results of this review formed the basis for the United States decision to announce its intention to withdraw.”

"To function effectively, this presidential appointee must be able to maintain a relationship of mutual confidence and respect with two people who are central in our government and who both outrank him: the Secretary of State and the United States Representative to the UN. If relations break down with either, the Assistant Secretary's usefulness is, of course, critically impaired. The protocol of the relationship places a handicap on the Assistant Secretary of State in carrying out his assigned duties. The United States Representative, particularly when he sits as a member of the President's Cabinet, obviously "outranks" the Assistant Secretary through whom he normally receives his instruction. The relationship between the Assistant Secretary and his principal, the Secretary of State, has in the past had its episodes of friction, of apparent lack of confidence, even of what can only be described as neglect. But in the main it has been harmonious. One consequence of the Secretary's confidence in the UN Assistant Secretary has been to contribute to the consistent and seemingly unavoidable preoccupation of the latter with the political, as opposed to the economic, social, trusteeship, technical, and other facets, of his responsibilities. The reasons for this preoccupation are several. The most obvious one is that great political crises have dominated the foreign policy scene over the last decade: Soviet relations in general, the Berlin Blockade, the Korean War, Indochina, Suez, and Hungary. All are life and death issues of survival or at any rate issues where the stakes were extraordinarily high. And all of them save Indochina became UN problems."

== Organization ==
The Bureau of International Organization Affairs is divided into eleven unique offices.

- Joint Executive Office (shared with and located within the Bureau of European and Eurasian Affairs)
- Office of Economic and Development Affairs
- Office of Management Policy and Resources
- Office of International Conferences
- Office of Public Affairs, Planning, and Coordination
- Office of Peace Operations, Sanctions, and Counterterrorism
- Office of Human Rights and Humanitarian Affairs
- Office of Specialized and Technical Agencies
- Office of UN Political Affairs
- Office of Regional Policy and Coordination
- Front Office

== Diplomatic missions ==
The Bureau of International Organization Affairs maintains diplomatic missions in New York, Geneva, Vienna, Rome, Montreal, and Nairobi to actively promote U.S. interests, in part by advocating for more effective, transparent, accountable, and efficient international organizations.

- United States Mission to the United Nations- New York
- United States Mission to the United Nations- Geneva
- United States Mission to the United Nations- Vienna
- United States Mission to the United Nations- Rome
- United States Mission to the International Civil Aviation Organization- Montreal
- United States Mission to the United Nations- Nairobi

== Presidential Commissions Report on the Bureau of International Organization Affairs ==
Responsibility for the direction and coordination of United States participation in international organizations is vested in the secretary of state. Despite the tremendous growth in United States involvement in international organizations since World War II, the PC reports that the International Organization Bureau of the Department of State has declined from 236 people in 1950 to 155 in 1970. While recognizing that smaller staffs are sometimes more effective than larger ones, the PC is concerned about the capability of the staff to "discharge its responsibilities in planning, supervising, and evaluating the ever-expanding and complex work of the principal organs of the UN as well as the performance of a dozen special bodies or programs of the Organization and 14 UN specialized agencies located around the world."' The Presidential Commission Report stated that the Bureau of International Organization Affairs had to undertake the following direction in order to maintain and fulfill the rules set by the State department in order to achieve effective bureaucratic operation. The PC recommends that (1) the Assistant Secretary for International Organization Affairs be given more comprehensive authority to deal with economic and social activities, noting that they account for 80 percent of UN expenditures, (2) technical staff members from other departments be attached to the bureau for limited periods of time to work on budgetary and programmatic problems of the specialized agencies, and (3) the bureau be funded adequately to obtain specific evaluations of the programs and effectiveness of UN activities.

== Peacekeeping and Humanitarian Law Policy ==
Ambassador Rosemary DiCarlo expressed the support of the United States in implementing the “New Horizon Project,” which attempts to better “anticipate challenges to peacekeeping missions.” Furthermore, the United States called for clearer mandates for Peace Keeping Operations (PKO's) by including “specific benchmarks whenever possible,” which would “greatly enhance the capacity of the UN to effectively undertake complex peace operations and to review those operations once undertaken.” The Ambassador also encouraged a greater effort from the UN member states as a whole to train and equip PKO's to meet increasing demands. Later, Ambassador Susan E. Rice reiterated the need to strengthen the “capacity of the organization to engage effectively in complex peace operations, at a time when the burdens and challenges placed on the institution are greater than ever.” Similarly, to assist and protect the civilians caught in conflicts, the United States claimed to be “deeply committed to supporting and advancing international humanitarian law.” In order to uphold this commitment, the international community has specific tasks it must undertake: “preventing conflicts, in the first place, keeping existing conflicts from escalating to mass atrocities, acting early and decisively when they occur, and ensuring that peace-building and post-conflict assistance consolidates peace durably once the conflict ends.” Lastly, Rice confirmed the necessity of PKO's to end violations of international humanitarian law and to safeguard civilians.

== Iran ==
Ambassador Susan E. Rice took the President's stance on concern over Iran's nuclear program, claiming that the U.S. “will look at what is necessary and appropriate with respect to maintaining pressure towards that goal of ending Iran’s nuclear program.” She also confirmed support of the Security Council's obligations on Iran, and encouraged direct diplomacy while continuing work with the Security Council. Similarly, the U.S. encouraged the Iran Sanctions Committee to “redouble its efforts to ensure full and robust implementation of Security Council resolutions 1737, 1747, and 1803.”

== Israel & Palestine ==
The United States policy, following the recent humanitarian crisis in Gaza, dictates the need for a ceasefire, stating that the US would “work diplomatically and through other means to try to support efforts to ensure that the ceasefire is lasting, and in that context for border crossings to be open and be available for humanitarian as well as day-to-day economic development imperatives.” Later, Ambassador Susan E. Rice claimed that the Palestinian civilians required “urgent humanitarian and reconstruction assistance.” She also called on Israel to investigate claims of humanitarian abuse made by Palestinians. Lastly, President Obama's preference for a two state solution (as described in Security Council Resolution 1850) was reiterated.

== Darfur ==
A priority was placed on civilian protection first and foremost. As a result, the United States will focus on “effective efforts to support the full and complete deployment of UNAMID so that there is the capacity on the ground to begin to effect that civilian protection.” Several weeks later, Ambassador Rice expressed the United States’ support of the International Criminal Court when they issued a warrant for Sudanese President Bashir's arrest and also of UN Security Council Resolution 1593, which “requires the Government of Sudan and all other parties to the conflict to cooperate fully with the ICC and its prosecutor.” Rice also stated that “no one should use the ICC’s decision as a pretext to incite or launch violence against civilians or international personnel.” After Bashir expelled humanitarian aid groups, the U.S. committed itself to greater efforts “with others to try to avert a deeper humanitarian crisis.”

The IO comes out with a series of reports every year to allow people to see what the IO is involved in when it comes to the UN. They also allow the public to see how the United States of America has voted in the UN.

== Current affairs and policy ==
In 2017, the bureau wrote that "The Bureau of International Organization Affairs pursues diplomatic goals through results-driven, transparent, accountable and efficient international organizations". It is also referred to as the IO for International Organization and is part of the department of state. The IO was created to regulate and help control a wide range of international affairs. One of the main goals that they work on is getting human rights to areas that do not have them and also making sure that they are being upheld in areas that already have them. Other areas that they work on is working with other countries and their economic growth, fair trade, the environment and much more.

== Investigation ==
The Office of the Inspector General (OIG), under the direction of Steve A. Linick, broadened investigation into allegations by five State Department officials that BIOA political appointees Mari Stull, Kevin Moley, John Zadrozny, and Bethany Kozma may have involved in retaliation against America's diplomatic corps for being insufficiently loyal to President Trump and his domestic policies. The investigations were triggered by complaints made in May and June 2018. House and Senate Democrats had also begun separate inquiries, regarding allegations against Stull.
