= Gerald P. Carmen =

American businessman (1930–2023)

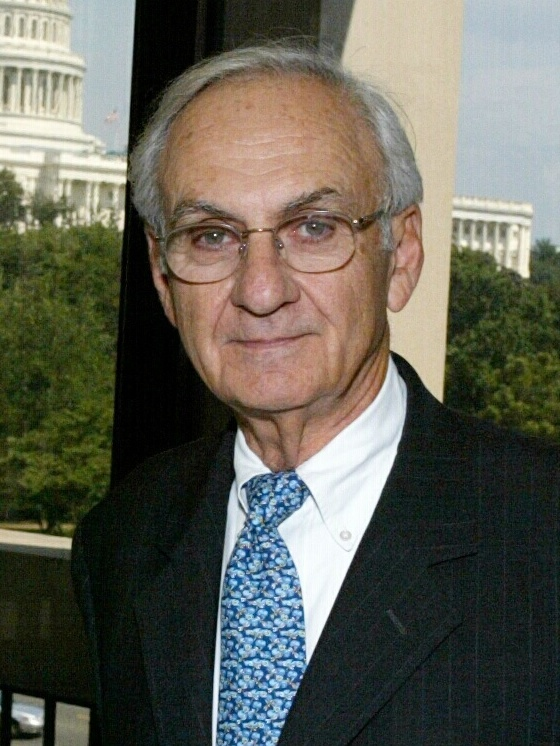

President and Chief Executive Officer of the Federal Asset Disposition Association
- In office February 24, 1988 – 1989
- President: Ronald Reagan; George H. W. Bush
- Preceded by: Roslyn B. Payne

10th United States Ambassador to the United Nations International Organizations in Geneva
- In office April 12, 1984 – August 31, 1986
- President: Ronald Reagan
- Preceded by: Geoffrey Swaebe
- Succeeded by: Joseph Carlton Petrone

12th Administrator of the General Services Administration
- In office May 26, 1981 – February 29, 1984
- President: Ronald Reagan
- Preceded by: Rowland G. Freeman III
- Succeeded by: Terence C. Golden

Personal details
- Born: July 8, 1930 Quincy, Massachusetts, U.S.
- Died: September 1, 2023 (aged 93)
- Party: Republican

Gerald Posner "Jerry" Carmen (July 8, 1930 – September 1, 2023) was an American businessman who was the Administrator of General Services Administration, and U.S. representative to the United Nations.

== Career ==
Carmen served as Administrator of the General Services Administration from 1981 to 1984, the United States Ambassador to the United Nations International Organizations in Geneva from 1984 to 1986 and as the President and Chief Executive Officer of the Federal Asset Disposition Association from 1988 to 1989.

== Personal life ==
On July 8, 1930, Carmen was born in Quincy, Massachusetts. Carmen's wife was Anita J. Saidel. They had 2 children. Carmen died on September 1, 2023, at the age of 93.
