= DeWayne Burns =

American legislator (born 1972)

Member of the Texas House of Representatives from the 58th district
- In office January 13, 2015 – January 14, 2025
- Preceded by: Robert Orr
- Succeeded by: Helen Kerwin

Personal details
- Born: DeWayne Christopher Burns; June 22, 1972 (age 54)
- Party: Republican
- Spouse: Jennifer
- Children: 3
- Education: Tarleton State University (BS)

DeWayne Christopher Burns (born June 22, 1972) is an American politician who served as a member of the Texas House of Representatives from the 58th district from 2015 until 2025. He was defeated by Helen Kerwin by a vote of 56% to 44% in the May 28, 2024 Republican primary runoff for the Texas House of Representatives for the 58th District.

== Early life and education ==
Burns was raised on a farm in Johnson County, Texas. He graduated from Cleburne High School in 1990. After attending Texas A&M University, he earned a Bachelor of Science degree in agricultural services and development from Tarleton State University.

== Career ==
After graduating from college, Burns worked for the Texas Grain and Feed Association. He later joined the staff of representatives Arlene Wohlgemuth and Gary Walker as a legislative analyst. He later joined the Texas Department of Agriculture, working under then-Commissioner Rick Perry as coordinator for special issues. Burns was elected to the Texas House of Representatives in 2014 and assumed office in 2015. Burns also served as chair of the House Agriculture and Livestock Committee.

Texas House of Representatives
Preceded by Robert Orr	Member of the Texas House of Representatives from the 58th district 2015–2025	Succeeded by Helen Kerwin
