= Joe Grogan =

American government official

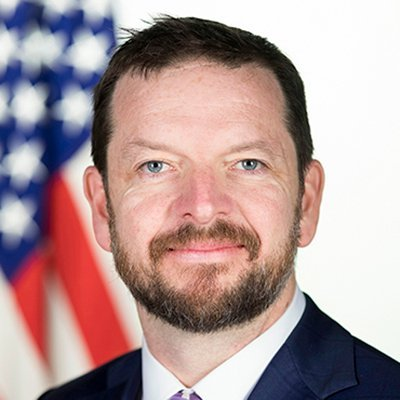
- Official portrait, 2019

Director of the Domestic Policy Council
- In office February 4, 2019 – May 24, 2020
- President: Donald Trump
- Preceded by: Andrew Bremberg
- Succeeded by: Brooke Rollins (acting)

Personal details
- Born: February 22, 1972 (age 54) Albany, New York, U.S.
- Party: Republican
- Education: State University of New York at Albany (BA); College of William & Mary (JD)

Joseph Grogan is the former director of the United States Domestic Policy Council and assistant to President Donald Trump. Appointed by Acting Chief of Staff Mick Mulvaney, Grogan converted the traditionally small office into an influential policy council.

Grogan worked from 2017 to January 2019 as a health care official in the Office of Management and Budget. He was appointed a member of the White House Coronavirus Task Force in January 2020.

On April 29, 2020, Grogan announced he would resign on May 24. He subsequently joined the board of directors of Verde Technologies.

Political offices
Preceded by Andrew Bremberg	Director of the Domestic Policy Council; 2019–2020	Succeeded by Brooke Rollins; Acting
