= Katrina vanden Heuvel =

American editor and publisher (born 1959)

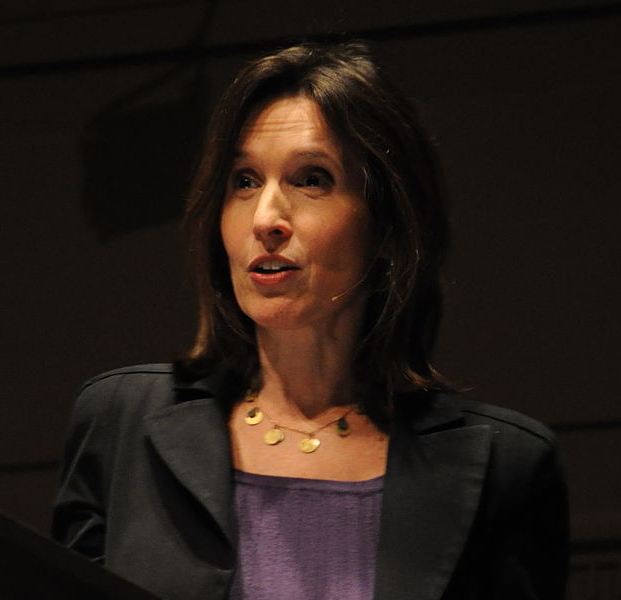
- vanden Heuvel in Seattle, 2011
- Born: October 7, 1959 (age 66); New York City, New York, U.S.
- Education: Princeton University (BA)
- Occupations: Editor; publisher
- Years active: 1978–present
- Spouse: Stephen F. Cohen (m. 1988; died 2020)
- Children: 1
- Parent(s): Jean Stein; William vanden Heuvel
- Relatives: Jules C. Stein (maternal grandfather)

Katrina vanden Heuvel (/ˈvæn.dɛnˈhjuː.vəl/ VAN-den-HYOO-vul; born October 7, 1959) is an American editor and publisher. She is the publisher, part-owner, and editor of the progressive magazine The Nation. She was the magazine's editor from 1995 to 2019, and again assumed the role of editor on August 1, 2025. She has frequently appeared as a commentator on political television programs. Vanden Heuvel is a member of the Council on Foreign Relations, a US nonprofit think tank. She is a recipient of the Norman Mailer Prize.

== Early life and education ==
Katrina vanden Heuvel was born in New York City, the daughter of Jean Stein, an heiress, best-selling author, and editor of the literary journal Grand Street, and William vanden Heuvel, an attorney, former US ambassador, member of John F. Kennedy's administration, businessman, and author. She has one sister and two step-siblings. Her maternal grandparents were Music Corporation of America founder Jules C. Stein and Doris Babbette Jones (originally Jonas). Through Doris, vanden Heuvel is a distant cousin of actor and comedian George Jessel. Her mother was from a Jewish family and her father was of Dutch and Belgian ancestry.

Vanden Heuvel graduated from the Trinity School in 1977. She graduated summa cum laude with an A.B. in politics from Princeton University in 1981 after completing a senior thesis titled "American Victims: A Study of the Anti-Communist Crusade." While at Princeton, she served as an editor and eventually as editor-in-chief of the Nassau Weekly, a school publication, and had an internship at National Lampoon magazine in 1978. She then worked as a production assistant at ABC for two years.

== Career ==
=== At The Nation ===
By the end of her junior year, vanden Heuvel had already worked for nine months as an intern at The Nation, after taking the "Politics and the Press" course taught by Blair Clark, the magazine's editor from 1976 to 1978, returning to the magazine in 1984 to serve as the foreign affairs assistant editor.

In 1989, vanden Heuvel was promoted to The Nation's editor-at-large position, responsible for its coverage of the USSR. In 1995, vanden Heuvel was named chief editor of The Nation.

By 1995, The Nation was losing $500,000 a year, and its editor Victor Navasky brought vanden Heuvel together with other investors in a for-profit partnership to buy the magazine from investment banker Arthur L. Carter. The investors included vanden Heuvel, Paul Newman, E. L. Doctorow, Alan Sagner (former Corporation for Public Broadcasting chairman), Peter Norton (Norton Utilities software creator) and others.

In a 2005 interview with Theodore Hamm in The Brooklyn Rail, vanden Heuvel described the contents of The Nation and its larger role in news media:

"Ideas, policy, activism, reporting, investigative reporting, as well as cultural pieces, reviews, writing. I hope people understand that about a third of this magazine, every week, is a very well edited, fascinating, cultural section, featuring reviews to people's of the big books as well as some of the under-appreciated, under-the-radar, independent books and films and art. But the main part of The Nation is to put on the agenda the ideas and views and news that might not otherwise be there, to comment—from our perspective—on the news of the week—and to provide strategies and some measure of hope in these times."

In April 2019, vanden Heuvel announced that she would step down on June 15, 2019, with D. D. Guttenplan taking her place.

=== Washington Post ===
Katrina Vanden Heuvel has written more than 140 articles for The Washington Post's Opinion Pieces section, from 2011 to as recently as 2022. She received criticism from fellow journalist Wendy Kaminer in 2019 based on the reporting standards of her article "Citizens United".

=== Other activities ===
With her husband, Stephen F. Cohen, vanden Heuvel edited Voices of Glasnost: Interviews with Gorbachev's Reformers (Norton, 1989). She also edited the compilation volume, The Nation: 1865–1990 (Pluto Press, 1987).

In 1990, vanden Heuvel co-founded Vy i My (You and We), a quarterly feminist journal linking American and Russian women, and elsewhere described as a Russian-language feminist newsletter.

She was editor for the collection, A Just Response: The Nation on Terrorism, Democracy and September 11, 2001 (New York : Thunder's Mouth Press/Nation Books, 2002) and co-edited Taking Back America – And Taking Down the Radical Right (Nation Books, 2004), and, more recently edited The Dictionary of Republicanisms (Nation Books, 2005).

As of April 2021, she continues to write an op-ed column for The Washington Post.

In her several opinion pieces in the Washington Post after the 2022 Russian invasion of Ukraine, she advocated avoiding enlarging NATO and consequently starting a Second Cold War with Russia and China, and also advised to "sit down and talk" to end the war in Ukraine immediately. She also warned about war hawks who might impede the peace process.

Vanden Heuvel criticized Kamala Harris' campaigning with figures in "the establishment" including Liz Cheney.

== Boards and other memberships ==
Vanden Heuvel is a member of the Council on Foreign Relations.

She also serves on the board of the Institute for Policy Studies, the World Policy Institute, the Correctional Association of New York, and the Franklin and Eleanor Roosevelt Institute and previously served on the board of the Institute for Women's Policy Research.

== Awards ==
In June 1987, vanden Heuvel edited a special edition of The Nation, "Gorbachev's Soviet Union", which was awarded the New York University Olive Branch Award.

Vanden Heuvel was awarded Planned Parenthood's Maggie Award for her 2003 article "Right-to-Lifers Hit Russia", a report on the anti-abortion movement in that country. She won the NYCLU's Callaway Prize for the Defense of the Right of Privacy and the American-Arab Anti-discrimination Committee's "Voices of Peace" award in 2003.

Vanden Heuvel has also been recognized and granted awards by the Liberty Hill Foundation, the Correctional Association, and the Association for American-Russian Women.

== Personal life ==
In 1988, vanden Heuvel married Stephen F. Cohen, a professor of Russian studies at Princeton University and later New York University. They were married by Congregationalist minister and peace activist William Sloane Coffin in a non-denominational ceremony. The couple have one daughter, Nicola, born in 1991. The family made their residence on the Upper West Side of Manhattan. Cohen died in September 2020.

In the 2016 presidential election, vanden Heuvel praised Senator Bernie Sanders as "the realist we should elect".

== Bibliography ==
=== Authored ===
- Stephen F. Cohen & Katrina vanden Heuvel (1990). Voices of Glasnost: Interviews with Gorbachev's Reformers. W. W. Norton & Company. ISBN 0393307352.
- Katrina vanden Heuvel (2005). Dictionary of Republicanisms: The Indispensable Guide to What They Really Mean When They Say What They Think You Want to Hear. PublicAffairs. ISBN 156025789X.
- Katrina vanden Heuvel (2011). The Change I Believe In: Fighting for Progress in the Age of Obama. New York: Nation Books. ISBN 9781568586885.

=== Edited ===
- A Just Response: The Nation on Terrorism, Democracy, and September 11, 2001 (2002), edited by Katrina vanden Heuvel (ISBN 1-56025-400-9)
- Taking Back America – And Taking Down the Radical Right (2004), edited by Katrina vanden Heuvel and Robert Borosage (ISBN 1-56025-583-8)

== See also ==
- Members of the Council on Foreign Relations
