= Jean Stein =

American author and editor

- Born: Jean Babette Stein; February 9, 1934; Chicago, Illinois, U.S.
- Died: April 30, 2017 (aged 83); New York City, U.S.
- Occupations: Author, editor
- Spouses: William vanden Heuvel (m. 1958; div. 1969); Torsten Wiesel (m. 1995; div. 2007)
- Children: 2, including Katrina vanden Heuvel
- Parents: Jules C. Stein; Doris Jones

Jean Babette Stein (February 9, 1934 – April 30, 2017) was an American author and editor.

== Early life ==
Stein was born to a Jewish family in Chicago. Her father was Jules C. Stein, co-founder of the Music Corporation of America (MCA) and the Jules Stein Eye Institute at the University of California, Los Angeles. Her mother, Doris J. Stein, established the Doris Jones Stein Foundation. Jean Stein's sister, Susan Shiva, died of breast cancer in 1983, as did Doris Stein.

Stein was educated at the Katharine Branson School in Ross, California, then at Brillantmont International School in Lausanne, Switzerland, after which she graduated from Miss Hewitt's Classes in New York City. She then spent two years at Wellesley College and attended classes at the University of Paris (formerly known as the Sorbonne). While in Paris she interviewed William Faulkner, with whom she had an affair, and, according to the historian Joel Williamson, offered the interview to The Paris Review in exchange for being made an editor there.

== Career ==
Stein returned to New York and worked in 1955 as assistant to director Elia Kazan on the original production of Tennessee Williams's play Cat on a Hot Tin Roof.

Stein was the author of three books and a pioneer of the narrative form of oral history. Her final work was a cultural and political history of Los Angeles, West of Eden, published by Random House in 2016. It includes interviews with stars like Arthur Miller, Gore Vidal, and Jacquelyn "Jackie" Park. In 1970, Stein authored, with George Plimpton as editor, a biography of Robert F. Kennedy, American Journey: The Times of Robert Kennedy.

In 1982, Stein and Plimpton co-wrote Edie: An American Biography (later retitled Edie: American Girl), a biography of socialite/actress and Andy Warhol muse Edie Sedgwick. Norman Mailer wrote: "This is the book of the Sixties that we have been waiting for."

Stein also worked as a magazine editor. In the late 1950s, she was an editor, with Plimpton, at The Paris Review. From 1990 to 2004, she was editor of the literary/visual arts magazine Grand Street with art editor Walter Hopps. The magazine actively sought out international authors, visual artists, composers and scientists to bring to its readership.

== Legacy ==
In 2017, Stein partnered with PEN America to launch the PEN/Jean Stein Book Award and the PEN/Jean Stein Grant for Oral History to honor groundbreaking literature. The annual $75,000 PEN/Jean Stein Book Award, which is awarded to a book of fiction, memoir, essay, or nonfiction, “focuses global attention on remarkable books that propel experimentation, wit, strength, and the expression of wisdom.” Hisham Matar, a Libyan-American writer, won the 2017 inaugural award for his memoir, The Return. The $10,000 PEN/Jean Stein Grant for Oral History is awarded to support the completion of a “literary work of nonfiction that uses oral history to illuminate an event, individual, place, or movement.”

== Personal life ==
Stein's first marriage in 1958 was to William vanden Heuvel, a lawyer who served in the U.S. Justice Department under Robert F. Kennedy and later became a diplomat and author. Their first daughter, Katrina vanden Heuvel, was born in 1959; she was the editor and publisher of The Nation magazine. The couple's second daughter, Wendy vanden Heuvel, is an actress and producer in New York. She was also on the board of the 52nd Street Project, which matches inner-city youth with professional theater artists to create original dramatic works.

From 1995 to 2007, Stein was married to Torsten Wiesel, a co-recipient with David H. Hubel of the 1981 Nobel Prize in Physiology or Medicine.

Suffering from depression, Stein died by suicide on April 30, 2017. She was 83.

== Selected works ==
- Stein, Jean (2016). West of Eden: An American Place. Random House. ISBN 978-0812998405.
- Stein, Jean; Plimpton, George (1982). Edie: American Girl. Knopf. ISBN 978-0394488196.
- Stein, Jean (1970). American Journey: The Times of Robert Kennedy. Harcourt Brace Jovanovich. ISBN 978-0151910700.
