= Jules C. Stein =

American physician and businessman

- Born: April 26, 1896; South Bend, Indiana, U.S.
- Died: April 29, 1981 (aged 85); Los Angeles, California, U.S.
- Burial place: Forest Lawn Memorial Park (Glendale)
- Occupations: Physician, businessman
- Known for: co-founder of Music Corporation of America
- Spouse: Doris Jones Stein (1928–1981; his death)
- Children: 2 daughters, including Jean Stein; 2 stepsons

Jules C. Stein (April 26, 1896 – April 29, 1981) was an American physician and businessman who co-founded Music Corporation of America (MCA).

== Early life and education ==
Stein was born in South Bend, Indiana, to Lithuanian Jewish immigrants, one of six children (three boys and three girls) of Louis Stein, a dry goods store owner, and Rosa Cohen (née Kahanaski). In 1915, he graduated from the University of Chicago. While in college, he supported himself by playing the violin and saxophone at weddings and bar mitzvahs; and later, realizing that he was not a very good musician, by organizing dance bands for the same events. Once, when he realized he could not make it to a gig, he hired a substitute whom he paid less than he would have personally made. This was the inspiration for focusing his energy on hiring musicians, instead of working as a musician himself, as a business model. In 1921, he graduated with a medical degree from Rush Medical College. He then went to the University of Vienna to study for a year and upon returning to Chicago, he was appointed chief resident at Cook County Hospital. Stein continued to book bands on the side and eventually left his secure life as an ophthalmologist for the entertainment industry. At the time, Chicago was a major centre for jazz—which had displaced ragtime as the popular music—and when combined with Prohibition, created a lucrative environment for entertainment. Stein adjusted to the new landscape and shifted from booking bands for weddings to nightclubs. Stein became very successful. Several of his bands played for speakeasies owned by Al Capone with whom Stein was a friend.

== Career ==
In 1924, he contributed $5,000 and along with equal contributions from Fred Hamm and Ernie Young, founded the Music Corporation of America (MCA). He arranged one-night bookings, rather than having bands seek engagements for whole seasons which was then the norm. He signed Guy Lombardo and other leading bands of the day. Stein started package deals for complete shows for hotels and radio broadcasting. Spreading from the one-man start to bases in New York, Los Angeles, Dallas and Cleveland, Stein's organization by the mid-1930s represented more than half of the nation's major bands, including those of Ted Weems, Isham Jones and Benny Goodman.

In 1937, MCA opened an agency in Hollywood and began to represent such stars as Bette Davis, Betty Grable, Joan Crawford, Greta Garbo, Eddie Cantor, Ingrid Bergman, Frank Sinatra, and Jack Benny. By the mid-1940s, it was estimated that half of the movie industry's stars were being represented by MCA. The MCA organization picked up the nickname the octopus due to its large reach in many different directions. In 1958, it acquired the 430-acre (170 ha) Universal Studios moving into producing television programs and motion pictures while still representing talent clients, resulting in accusations of conflict of interest.

In 1958, Music Corporation of America was reincorporated as MCA, Inc., which it was known by and took its stock public. Dr. Stein's biggest accomplishment came in 1962 when his company announced it was buying American Decca Records and its subsidiary Universal Pictures; however that same year, a federal antitrust suit was started against MCA. Both parties reached an agreement that MCA dispose of its worldwide talent agency business to go forward with its acquisition. Stein had been sole owner of the organization until 1954, when he voluntarily distributed 53 percent of his interest to key executives and employees, with 10 percent of the stock placed in an innovative MCA profit-sharing trust. Stein served as president of MCA until 1946 when he named Lew Wasserman as his successor as chief executive. He continued as chairman of the board until 1973, thereafter remaining a director.

== Philanthropy ==
Jules Stein and his wife Doris founded the Jules Stein Eye Institute at UCLA in the 1960s.

In 1960, Stein founded the nonprofit organization Research To Prevent Blindness.

In 1942, Stein, John Garfield, and Bette Davis also founded the Hollywood Canteen. (The Stage Door Canteen was on the US' East Coast).

== Personal life ==
In 1928, he married Doris Babette Openheimer (née Jones) who was also of Jewish descent. She had two sons, Harold and Gerald, with her first husband, Harold Oppenheimer, a Kansas City car dealer whom she married at the age of eighteen; Stein raised her sons as his own. Doris was also a cousin of the actor George Jessel. Stein and Openheimer had two daughters:

- Jean Stein (1934–2017), author and editor, married William vanden Heuvel, a diplomat and lawyer who served in the U.S. Justice Department under Robert F. Kennedy. They had two children: journalist and television personality Katrina vanden Heuvel, editor-publisher of The Nation; and Wendy vanden Heuvel (born 1961), an actress and producer in New York. Jean Stein later married Torsten Wiesel, a co-recipient with David H. Hubel of the 1981 Nobel Prize in Physiology or Medicine.
- Susan Stein Shiva (1936–1983) married Gil Shiva of New York. They had two children: Alexandra Elizabeth Shiva, and Andrew Shiva Ph.D., who founded the National Currency Foundation.

Stein owned Misty Mountain, a Wallace Neff designed house on Angelo Drive, Beverly Hills. Stein bought the house in 1940; it was sold after his death to Rupert Murdoch. Jean Stein wrote of her upbringing in the house and her parents' parties there in her 2016 memoir West of Eden.

Jules Stein died in Los Angeles, aged 85, in 1981. His widow, Doris J. Stein, later founded the Doris J. Stein Foundation in Beverly Hills, California. He is interred at Forest Lawn Memorial Park in Glendale, California.
