= Betty E. King =

American diplomat

Betty King
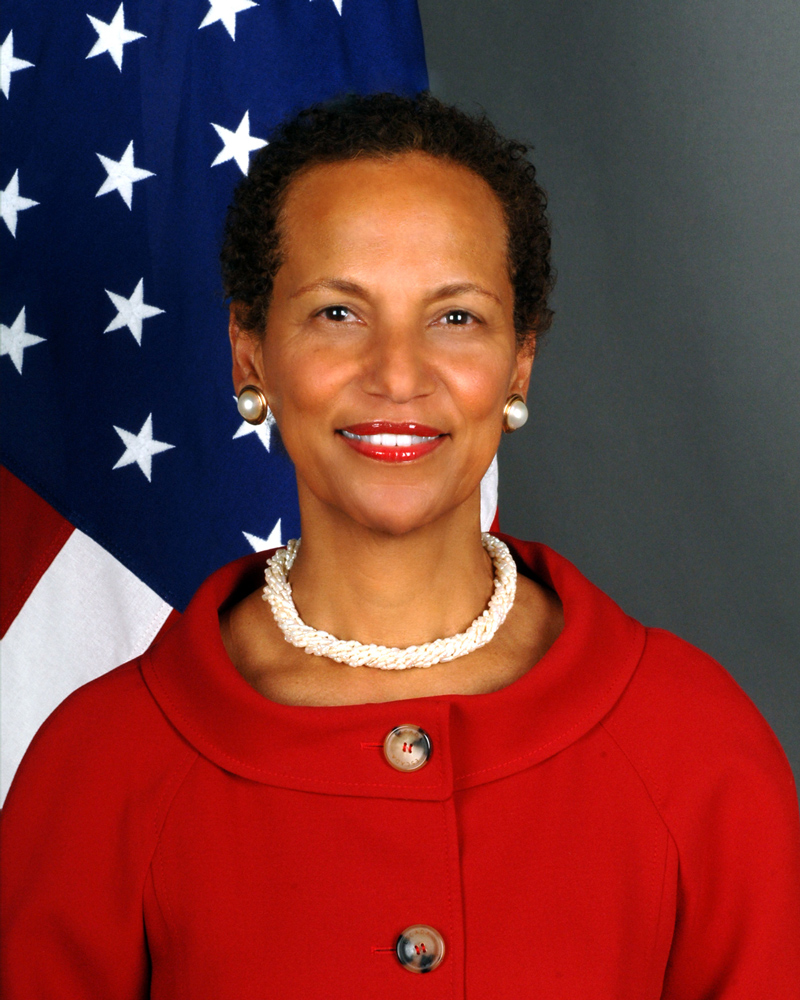

United States Ambassador to the United Nations International Organizations in Geneva
- In office February 12, 2010 – November 2, 2013
- President: Barack Obama
- Preceded by: Warren W. Tichenor
- Succeeded by: Pamela Hamamoto

Personal details
- Born: 1944 (age 81–82) Saint Vincent
- Education: University of Windsor (BA); Stony Brook University (MA)

Betty Eileen King is an American diplomat born in Saint Vincent. From 2010 to 2013 she served as the Representative of the United States to the European Office of the United Nations in Geneva, Switzerland.

== Education ==
King received a Bachelor of Arts from the University of Windsor in Ontario, Canada. Later, she received a master's degree from Stony Brook University.

== Diplomatic posting ==
King was confirmed as Permanent Representative (with the rank of Ambassador) to the UN in Geneva by the United States Senate on February 12, 2010, and was sworn in on February 18. She arrived in Geneva in March 2010, thirteen months after the last ambassador left. She had served in that post until late 2013.

Diplomatic posts
Preceded by Warren W. Tichenor	United States Ambassador to the United Nations International Organizations in Geneva; 2010–2013	Succeeded by Pamela Hamamoto
