= Mari Stull =

American lobbyist, public servant, and wine enthusiast

- Occupations: Lobbyist, wine blogger

Mari Stull is an American blogger, lobbyist, and former Trump administration political appointee to the United States Department of State's Bureau of International Organization Affairs. She is alternatively known as the Vino Vixen and by her maiden name, Mari Dunleavy.

== Pre-State Department career ==
Prior to 2003 she was an international lobbyist for the food and beverage industry. She spent five years working at the Inter-American Institute for Cooperation on Agriculture. From 1992 to 1994 she was the acting director of Regulatory and Procedural Development at the Federal Crop Insurance Corporation of the US Department of Agriculture. She represented the Grocery Manufacturers Association for number of years.

She is the founder and former executive director of the Caribbean Agribusiness Association: Trinidad and Tobago. In 2003 she semi-retired from the lobbying industry and launched a career as a wine pundit. She was the Wine Editor of the Alexandria Times. As a wine consultant she branded herself The Vino Vixen and ran a wine blog under that name, with her brother Kevin Dunleavy was CEO. She has claimed to have trademarked Vino Vixen. Although the blog was canceled folling her State Department controversy, the cached intro is still available online.

== State Department career ==
Stull was appointed as a senior advisor to the Bureau of International Organization Affairs shortly after the election of President Donald Trump. Her tenure was contentious with allegations of workplace bullying and harassment as well as undue politicization of the diplomatic service made against her. Stull reportedly engaged in six to eight hostile interactions a day at the BIOA. She objected to a legislative affairs staffer accompanying a Congressional Black Caucus trip as was standard procedure because it contained only Democrats, she reportedly personally accused the staffer of undermining President Trump's agenda and reassigned their responsibilities.

Stull's State Department career concluded January 11, 2019. At the time of her departure she was under investigation by an internal State Department watchdog and a US House of Representatives committee. Her actions over the course of her State Department career reportedly resulted in at least three Senior and numerous junior staff leaving the department.

In August 2019 the Office of Inspector General (United States) found that Stull and Assistant Secretary of State Kevin Moley had engaged in harassment, mistreatment, and retaliation of career state department employees. Rep. Elijah Cummings commented that Stull and Moley had violated the public trust. The report characterized the working environment under Stull and Moley to be “vindictive” and stated that “OIG found evidence of leadership and management deficiencies and mistreatment of career employees in the Bureau of International Organization Affairs. These inappropriate practices included disrespectful and hostile treatment of employees, accusations against and harassment of career employees premised on claims that they were ‘disloyal’ based on their perceived political views, and retaliation associated with conflicts of interest,” as well as retaliation against employees who refused to participate in activities over legitimate conflict of interest concerns. Stull’s former office disputed some of the actions described in the report.

=== Loyalty lists controversy ===
Soon after being appointed to a senior position in the Bureau of International Organization Affairs it was alleged that Stull was creating lists of those perceived as loyal or disloyal to the President. This included reviewing employees social media accounts for hints about their political and social positions. She would personally confront those who she believed to be disloyal and called State Department employees 'Obama holdovers,' 'traitors,' and ‘disloyal,’ to their faces. She was accused of making lists of State Department employees suspected of potential disloyalty to President Trump, as well as private U. S. citizens working for the United Nations and other international organizations. Reporting on these incidents raised the attention of the United States Senate Committee on Foreign Relations. The August 2019 IG report did not contain any information confirming or denying the existence of a loyalty list.

== Life after State Department ==
Stull returned to the Inter-American Institute for Cooperation on Agriculture, assuming a position in The Bahamas. Stull is a contributor to WineTasteTV. She is a senior fellow at the American Opportunity Foundation.
