= Helen Kerwin =

American politician (born 1947)

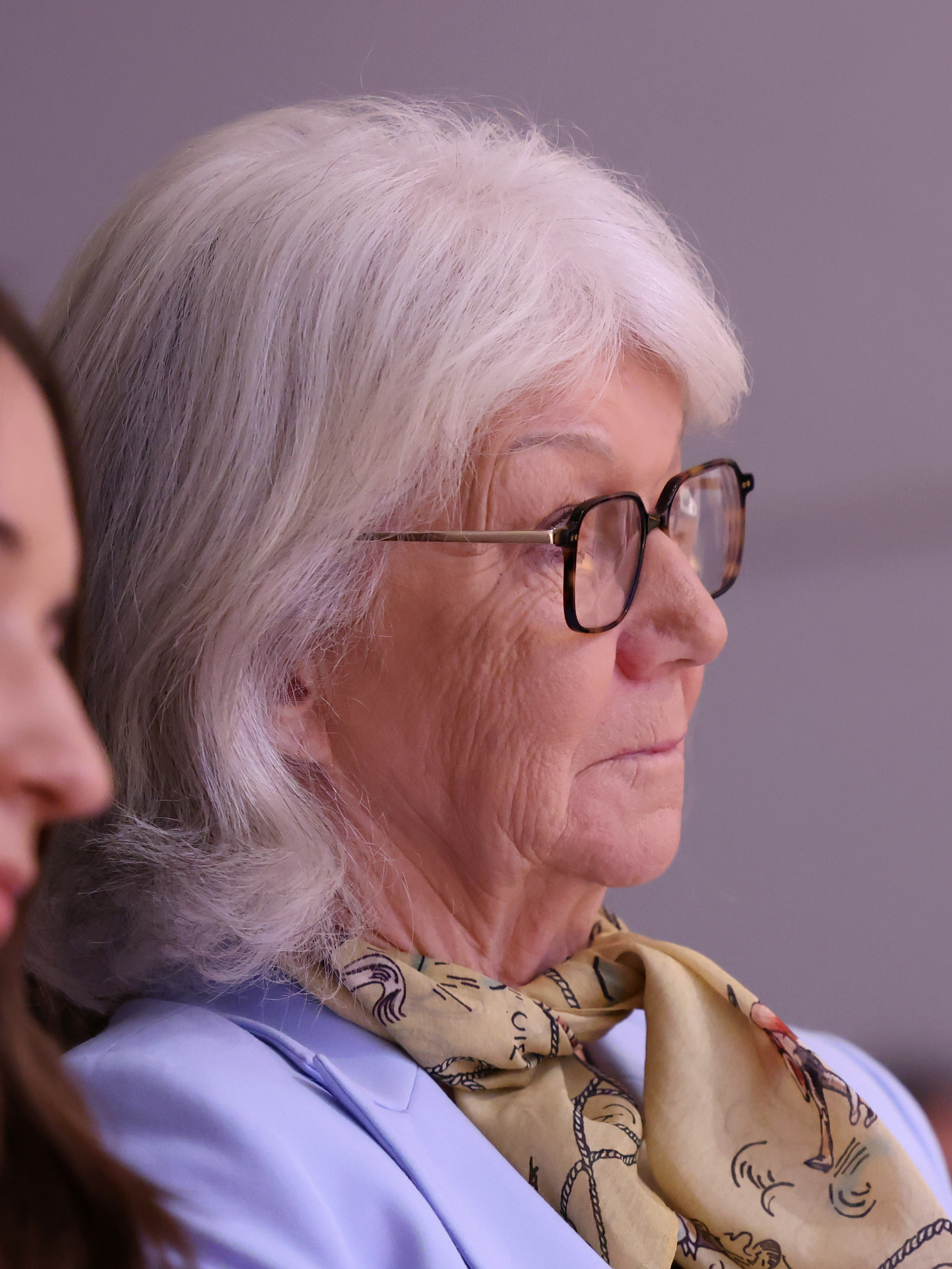
- Kerwin in 2025

Member of the Texas House of Representatives from the 58th district
- Incumbent
- Assumed office January 14, 2025
- Preceded by: DeWayne Burns

Somervell County Commissioner
- In office January 2000

Mayor of Glen Rose
- In office January 1998 – January 2000

Personal details
- Born: October 10, 1947 (age 79) Minnesota
- Party: Republican
- Spouse: Hugh Leslie (m. 1969, separated)
- Children: 3, including Brooke Rollins
- Education: California State University
- Website: Campaign website

Helen Dean Kerwin (born October 10, 1947) is an American politician who has served as a member of the Texas House of Representatives for the 58th district since 2025. A member of the Republican Party, she defeated incumbent DeWayne Burns for the party's nomination in 2024. Her daughter, Brooke Rollins, is currently serving as the United States Secretary of Agriculture.

== Career ==
Kerwin and her husband both worked in the hotel industry and purchased the Glen Hotel in Glen Rose, Texas, in 1975 then sold it. After the two separated, Kerwin opened a flower shop before selling it to run for mayor. She has owned the Country Woods Inn, a ranch and bed-and-breakfast, since 1980.

== Political career ==
=== Mayor of Glen Rose ===
In 1997, Kerwin ran and won a term as mayor. She was then elected as a Somervell County Commissioner.

=== Texas State House Election ===
In 2024, Kerwin announced her campaign for the Texas House of Representatives in the 58th district against incumbent Republican DeWayne Burns. Burns had voted against school voucher legislation, drawing criticism from Greg Abbott and his endorsement of Kerwin. She placed first in the Republican primary election and defeated Burns in the ensuing run-off election.

=== Tenure ===
In January 2025, Kerwin supported David Cook for speaker and introduced legislation to combat PFAS contamination in sewage sludge-based fertilizers.

== Electoral history ==
2024 Texas House of Representatives, District 58 Republican primary
Party	Candidate	Votes	%
Republican	Helen Kerwin	11,535	48.90%
Republican	DeWayne Burns (incumbent)	9,724	41.22%
Republican	Lyndon Laird	2,330	9.88%
Total votes		23,589	100.00%

2024 Texas House of Representatives, District 58 Republican primary runoff
Party	Candidate	Votes	%
Republican	Helen Kerwin	7,685	57.54%
Republican	DeWayne Burns (incumbent)	5,670	42.46%
Total votes		13,355	100.00%

2024 Texas House of Representatives, District 58 general election
Party	Candidate	Votes	%
Republican	Helen Kerwin	63,760	82.06%
Libertarian	Richard Windmann	13,935	17.94%
Total votes		77,695	100%
Republican hold			

== Personal life ==
Kerwin raised three daughters as a single mother; Brooke who is currently serving as the United States Secretary of Agriculture, Helen Jr. who is principal of Glen Rose Intermediate School, and Ann who is a professor at Texas Christian University and married to the university's chancellor, Daniel Pullin. She grew up in Minnesota and married her husband, Hugh Leslie, in 1969 and the couple moved to California before moving to Texas in 1975 to buy and operate a hotel; the two later separated.
