= Esther Brimmer =

American civil servant (born 1961)

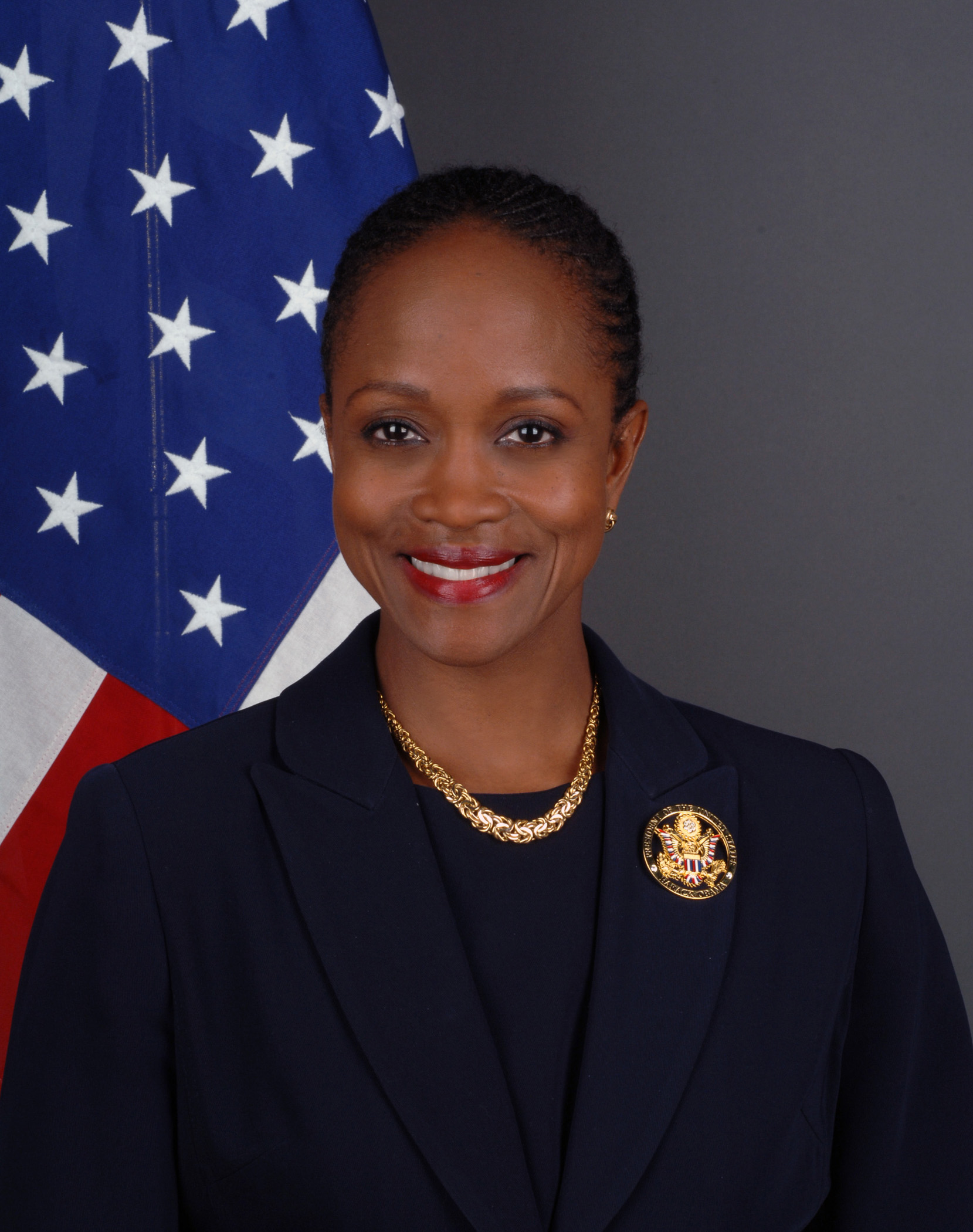
- Brimmer circa 2009

25th Assistant Secretary of State for International Organization Affairs
- In office April 6, 2009 – September 5, 2013
- President: Barack Obama
- Preceded by: Brian H. Hook
- Succeeded by: Bathsheba N. Crocker

Personal details
- Born: Esther Diane Brimmer; 1961 (age 64–65)
- Party: Democratic
- Spouse: Steven Beller
- Children: 1
- Relatives: Andrew Brimmer (Father)
- Education: Pomona College (BA); New College, Oxford (MA, PhD)

Esther Diane Brimmer (born 1961) is an American foreign policy expert and former Assistant Secretary of State for International Organization Affairs. In June 2013, she left her post as Assistant Secretary and returned to academia.

In January 2017, she became the executive director and CEO of NAFSA.

From October 2013 to January, 2017, she served as the J.B. and Maurice C. Shapiro Professor of International Affairs at the George Washington University's Elliott School of International Affairs.

== Education ==
She received a B.A. in International Relations from Pomona College in Claremont, California, USA., and a M.A. and D.Phil. in International Relations from the New College, Oxford, UK. She received an honorary doctorate from Pomona College in 2019. She is a graduate of National Cathedral School for Girls (1979), and was one of the first African American students in the sixties at Beauvoir, the National Cathedral Elementary School.

== Career ==
Brimmer has served in the United States government and in international affairs think tanks. From 1999-2001 she was a Member of the Office of Policy Planning at the U.S. Department of State working on the European Union, Western Europe, the United Nations, and multilateral security issues. From 1995-1999 she managed projects as a Senior Associate at the Carnegie Commission on Preventing Deadly Conflict. She also served as a Special Assistant to the Under Secretary of State for Political Affairs (1993-1995) and as a Legislative Analyst at the Democratic Study Group in the United States House of Representatives (1991-1993). Following her school work at Oxford, she was a management consultant with McKinsey.

From September 2005 on Brimmer was a visiting professor at the College of Europe.

She was nominated to the post of Assistant Secretary of State for International Organization Affairs by President Barack Obama on March 11, 2009, and was confirmed by the United States Senate on April 2, 2009. Previously, Dr. Brimmer served as Deputy Director and Director of Research at the Center for Transatlantic Relations at the Paul H. Nitze School of Advanced International Studies (SAIS) at Johns Hopkins University, Washington, D.C.

She is a member of the Atlantic Council Board of Directors, Council on Foreign Relations, and Women in International Security.

She left her post at the State Department in June 2013 to resume her position in academia.

== Personal life ==
Brimmer is the daughter of Andrew Brimmer, the first African American to have served as governor of the Federal Reserve System. Her husband is historian and author Steven Beller. They have one son, playwright Nathaniel Brimmer-Beller.

== Publications ==
She has, inter alia, edited Transforming Homeland Security: U.S. and European Approaches (2006), The Strategic Implications of European Union Enlargement (with Fröhlich, 2005), The EU’s Search for a Strategic Role: ESDP and Its Implications for Transatlantic Relations (2002) and The European Union Constitutional Treaty: A Guide for Americans (2004), and she is the author of The United States, the European Union and International Human Rights Issues (2002).

Government offices
Preceded by Brian H. Hook	Assistant Secretary of State for International Organization Affairs; 2009–2013	Succeeded by Bathsheba N. Crocker
