= Bathsheba Nell Crocker =

American diplomat (born 1968)

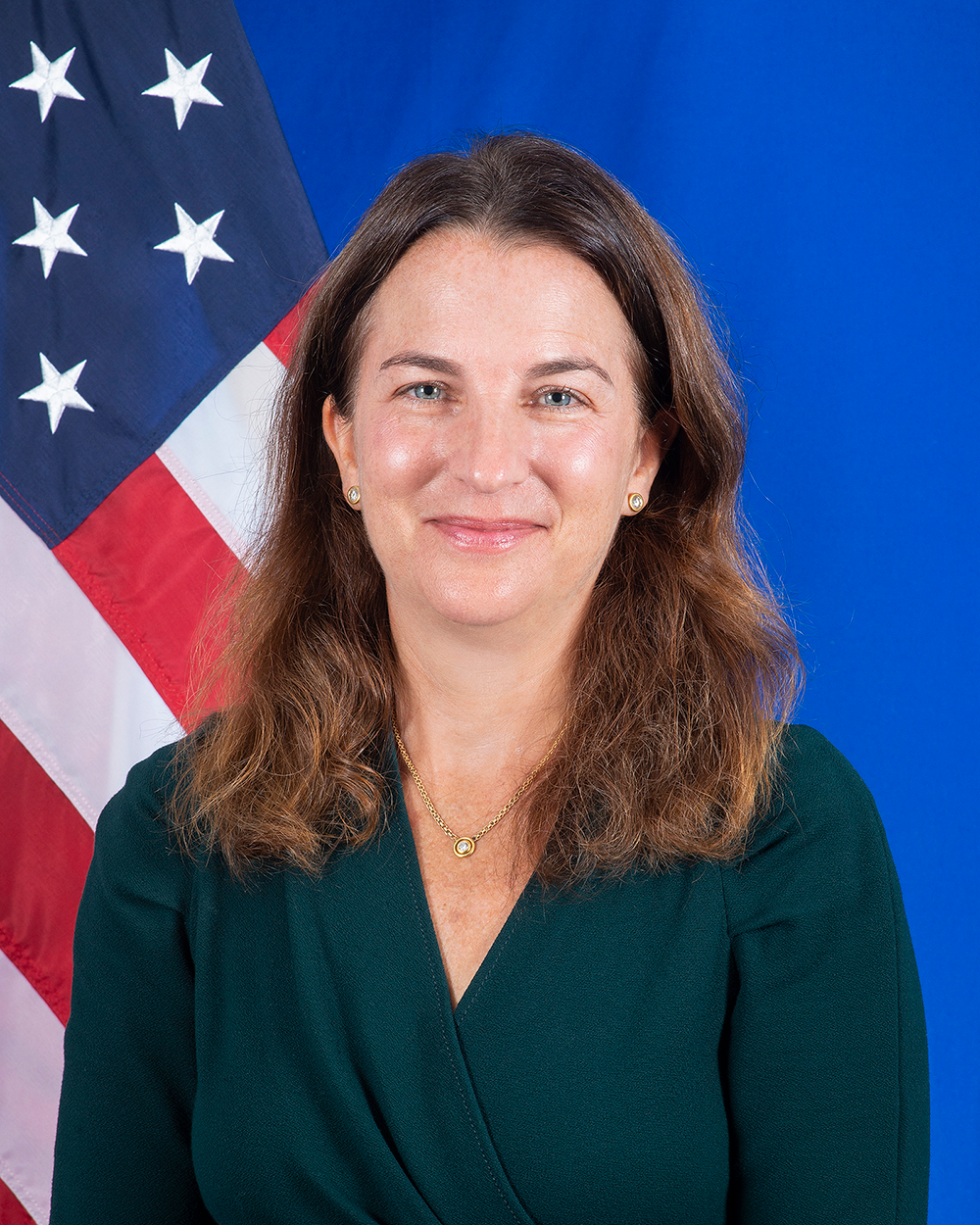

Permanent Representative of the United States to the United Nations and Other International Organizations in Geneva
- In office January 18, 2022 – January 20, 2025
- President: Joe Biden
- Preceded by: Andrew Bremberg
- Succeeded by: Todd Steggerda

26th Assistant Secretary of State for International Organization Affairs
- In office September 19, 2014 – January 20, 2017
- President: Barack Obama
- Deputy: Theodore Allegra; Tracey Ann Jacobson
- Preceded by: Esther Brimmer
- Succeeded by: Kevin Moley

Personal details
- Born: 1968 (age 57–58)
- Parent: Chester Crocker (father)
- Education: Stanford University (BA); Tufts University (MA); Harvard University (JD)

Bathsheba "Sheba" Nell Crocker (born 1968) is an American diplomat who had served as the Permanent Representative of the United States to the United Nations and Other International Organizations in Geneva. She previously served as Assistant Secretary of State for International Organization Affairs from 2014 to 2017.

== Education ==
The daughter of Chester Crocker, Crocker received a Bachelor of Arts from Stanford University, a Master of Arts from the Fletcher School of Law and Diplomacy, and a Juris Doctor from Harvard Law School.

== Career ==
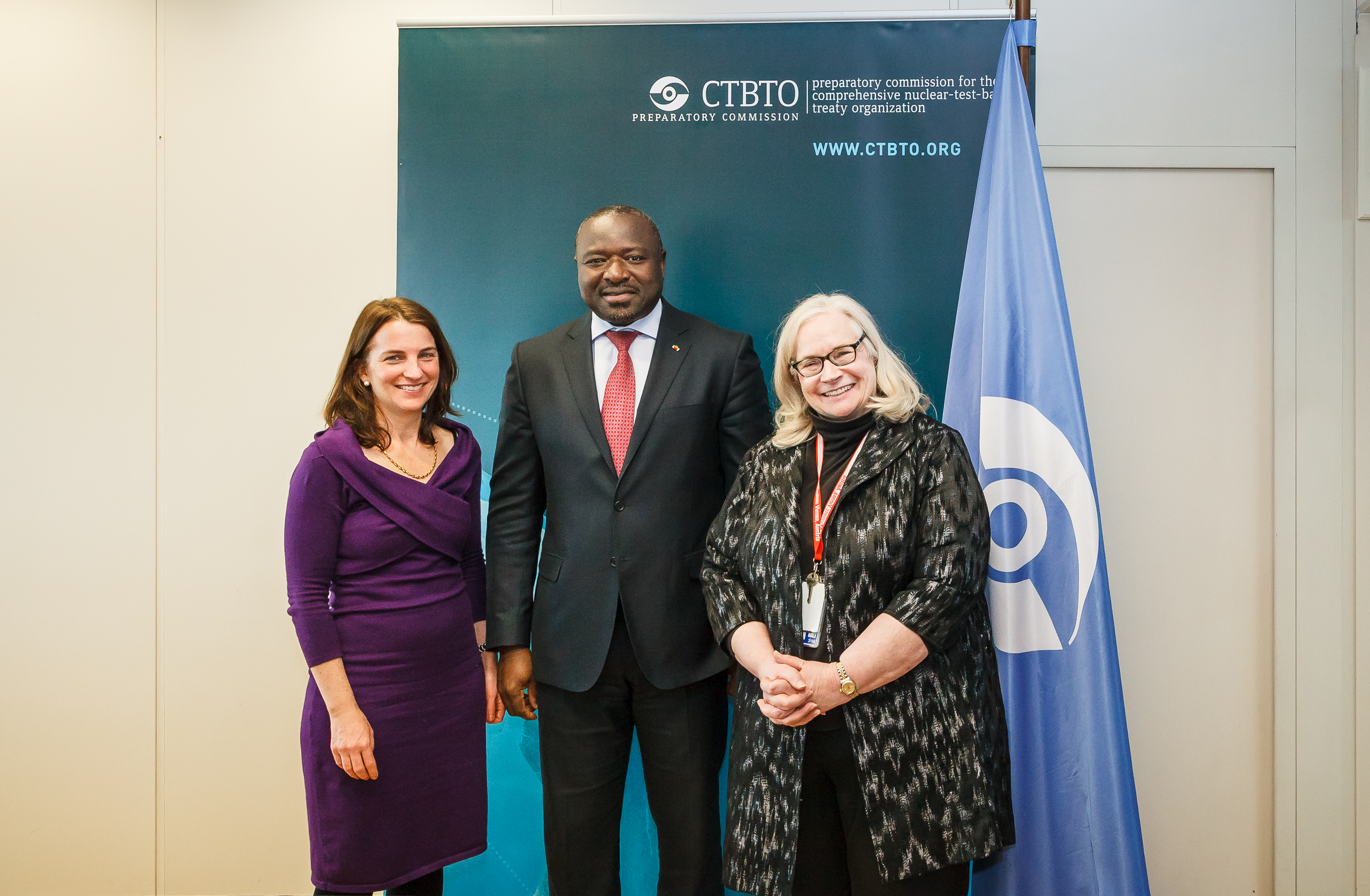
Sheba Crocker, (left) and Ambassador Laura Kennedy, Chargé d'Affaires of the Permanent Mission of the United States to the UN Vienna (right) visiting Lassina Zerbo, Executive Secretary of the Preparatory Commission for the Comprehensive Nuclear-Test-Ban Treaty Organization, on Wednesday, 4 March 2015.

Crocker was an International Affairs Fellow at the Council on Foreign Relations from 2002 to 2003. From 2003 to 2005, Crocker worked at the Center for Strategic and International Studies on the Post-Conflict Reconstruction Project as a fellow and co-director. Crocker was also the Deputy Chief of Staff at the Office of the UN Special Envoy for Tsunami Recovery, from 2005 to 2007. Afterwards, she was the senior advisor to the Assistant Secretary-General for Peacebuilding Support at the UN Peacebuilding Support Office, from 2007 to 2008. From 2008 to 2009, Crocker was a Senior Policy and Advocacy Officer for International Affairs at the Bill & Melinda Gates Foundation.

Crocker most recently served in several positions at the U.S. Department of State, including as a Senior Adviser to the Secretary of State, as the Principal Deputy Director in the Office of Policy Planning under Jake Sullivan, and as Chief of Staff to Deputy Secretary of State James Steinberg.

Crocker has also previously served as an attorney-adviser for the Office of the Legal Adviser of the Department of State; as deputy U.S. special representative for Southeast Europe Affairs at the U.S. Embassy in Rome, Italy; and as the executive assistant to the Deputy National Security Advisor for the National Security Council at the White House. She has also taught as an adjunct professor at Johns Hopkins University, George Washington University, and American University.

Crocker was confirmed by the United States Senate on September 18, 2014, and was sworn in as Assistant Secretary for International Organization Affairs the next day on September 19, 2014.

After leaving the Department of State in January 2017, Crocker joined CARE USA as their vice president for humanitarian policy and practice.

In November 2020, Crocker was named a volunteer member of the Joe Biden presidential transition Agency Review Team to support transition efforts related to the United States Department of State and the United States Mission to the United Nations.

=== Ambassador to the UN in Geneva ===
On June 24, 2021, President Joe Biden nominated Crocker to serve as the next Permanent Representative of the United States to the United Nations and Other International Organizations in Geneva. Hearings on her nomination were held before the Senate Foreign Relations Committee on September 15, 2021. The committee favorably reported the nomination on October 19, 2021. Crocker was confirmed by the entire Senate on December 18, 2021, via voice vote. Crocker was sworn in on December 21, 2021, and presented her credentials on January 18, 2022.

Government offices
Preceded by Esther Brimmer	Assistant Secretary of State for International Organization Affairs; 2014–2017	Succeeded by Tracey Ann Jacobson (Acting)
