= Andrew Bremberg =

American lawyer and diplomat (born 1979)

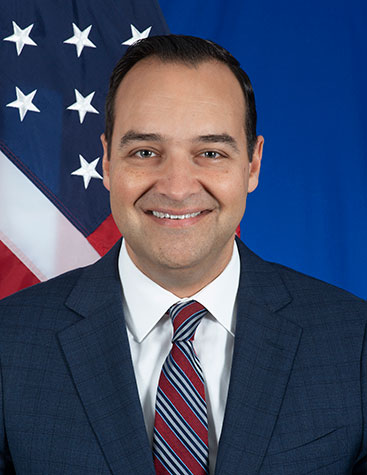

United States Ambassador to the United Nations European Office
- In office November 12, 2019 – January 20, 2021
- President: Donald Trump
- Preceded by: Pamela Hamamoto
- Succeeded by: Bathsheba Nell Crocker

Director of the Domestic Policy Council
- In office January 20, 2017 – February 2, 2019
- President: Donald Trump
- Deputy: Paul Winfree; Lance Leggitt
- Preceded by: Cecilia Muñoz
- Succeeded by: Joe Grogan

Personal details
- Born: Andrew Paul Bremberg; February 2, 1979 (age 47)
- Party: Republican
- Education: Franciscan University (BA); Catholic University (JD)

Andrew Paul Bremberg (born February 2, 1979) is an American attorney and political advisor who most recently served as Permanent Representative of the United States of America to the Office of the United Nations and Other International Organizations in Geneva. He previously served as Assistant to the President and the director of the Domestic Policy Council for U.S. President Donald Trump.

== Education ==
Bremberg earned a Bachelor of Arts degree in psychology and theology from the Franciscan University of Steubenville and a Juris Doctor from the Catholic University of America's Columbus School of Law in 2006.

== Career ==
Bremberg was employed by the United States Department of Health and Human Services from July 2001 to January 2009 and served as Senior Advisor and Chief of Staff to the Assistant Secretary for Public Health during the George W. Bush administration.

From 2009 to 2014, Bremberg was the department manager and top health policy expert for MITRE, a not-for-profit organization that provides services to the United States government. MITRE manages Federally Funded Research and Development Centers (FFRDCs) supporting the Department of Defense (DOD), the Federal Aviation Administration (FAA), the Internal Revenue Service (IRS), the Department of Veterans Affairs (VA), the Department of Homeland Security (DHS), the Administrative Office of the U.S. Courts on behalf of the Federal Judiciary, the Centers for Medicare and Medicaid Services (CMS), and the National Institute of Standards and Technology (NIST).

Bremberg served as policy advisor and counsel on nominations for Senator Mitch McConnell was the policy director for the Scott Walker 2016 presidential campaign.

During the 2016 election cycle, Bremberg served as the policy director for the GOP Platform Committee. Bremberg was later the leader of President-elect Donald Trump's transition team for Health and Human Services. He was named Assistant to the President and the director of the Domestic Policy Council. As Assistant to the President he co-chaired the National Council for the American Worker along with Wilbur Ross (Secretary of Commerce), Eugene Scalia (Secretary of Labor) and Ivanka Trump (Advisor to the President).

Bremberg, alongside Marc Short and Rick Dearborn, coordinated with aides of Senator Mitch McConnell in employing the Congressional Review Act to reverse 13 regulations made late in the presidency of Barack Obama by creating an Excel spreadsheet of targets, eventually being able to eliminate over twice as many regulations as they had anticipated.

In September 2018, President Trump announced his intent to nominate Bremberg as the next Representative of the United States to the European Office of the United Nations in Geneva with the rank of ambassador. His nomination was confirmed by a 50–44 vote on October 22, 2019. Bremberg presented his credentials to Director-General Tatiana Valovaya in Geneva on November 12, 2019.

Bremberg has collaborated to Project 2025; he is thanked for his contribution to Chapter 1: "White House Office".

Political offices
Preceded by Cecilia Muñoz	Director of the Domestic Policy Council; 2017–2019	Succeeded by Joe Grogan
Diplomatic posts
Preceded by Pamela Hamamoto	United States Ambassador to the United Nations International Organizations in Geneva; 2019–2021	Succeeded by Mark Cassayre (Acting)
