= Rob Orr (politician) =

American politician

Member of the Texas House of Representatives from the 58th district
- In office 2005–2015
- Succeeded by: DeWayne Burns

Personal details
- Born: 20 December 1955 (age 70)
- Party: Republican
- Education: University of Alaska

Rob Orr (born 20 December 1955) is an American politician. He served in the Texas House of Representatives from District 58 from 2005 to 2015.
