= Pamela Hamamoto =

American diplomat

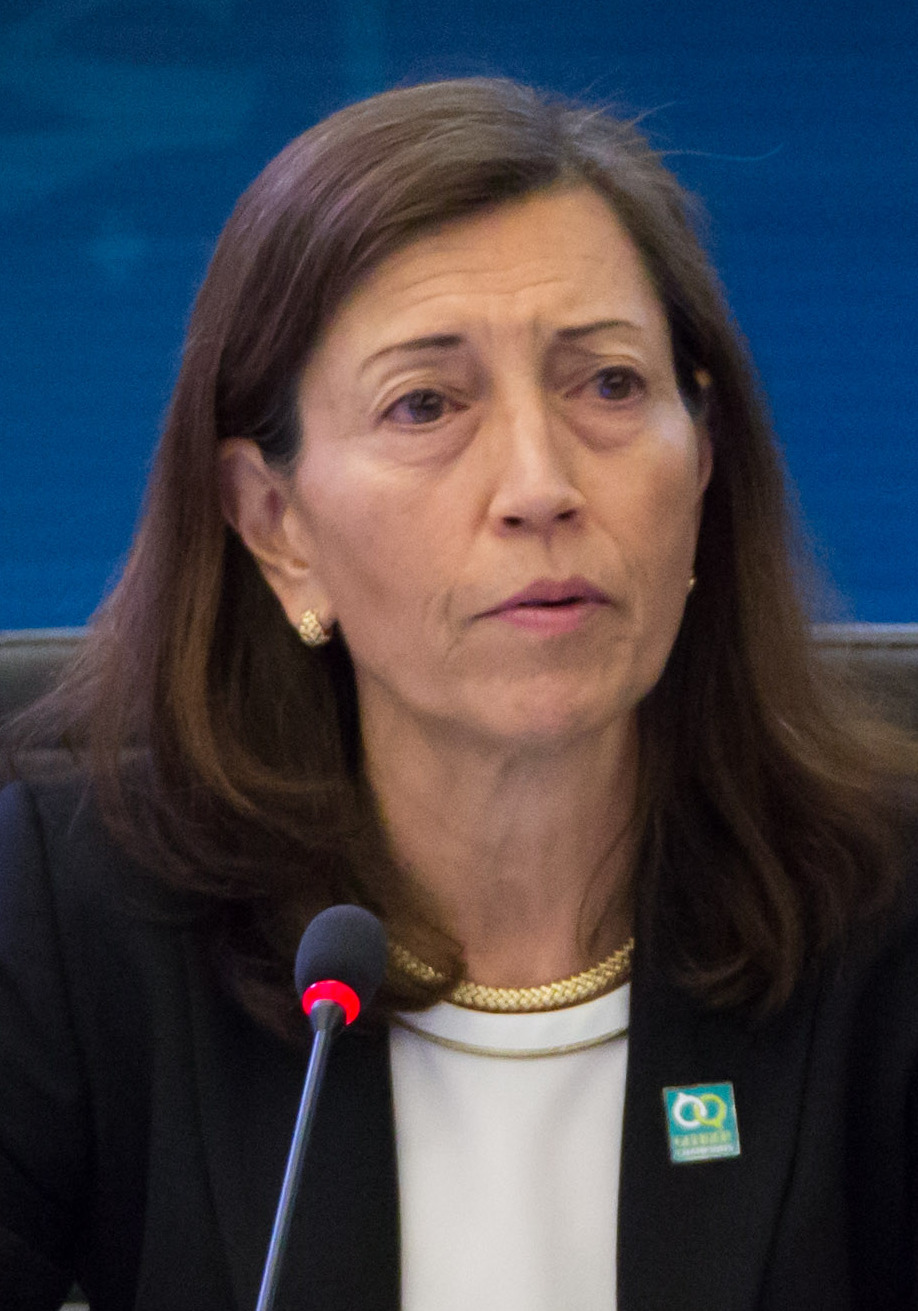

18th United States Ambassador to the United Nations International Organizations in Geneva
- In office June 26, 2014 – January 20, 2017
- President: Barack Obama
- Preceded by: Betty E. King
- Succeeded by: Andrew Bremberg

Personal details
- Born: 1960 (age 65–66)
- Education: Stanford University (B.S., M.S.); University of California, Los Angeles (M.B.A.)

Pamela K. Hamamoto is an American diplomat who served as the 18th United States Ambassador as Representative of the United States to the European Office of the United Nations in Geneva.

== Early life and education ==
Hamamoto is a native of Hawaii, one of four children born to Howard and Joanne Russell Hamamoto. She attended the Punahou School with future U.S. President Barack Obama.

She earned a B.S. and an M.S. in Civil Engineering from Stanford University in 1983 and an M.B.A. from the UCLA Anderson School of Management in 1990.

== Career ==
Hamamoto began her career as a civil engineer for Pacific Gas and Electric Company, developing computer models to optimize hydroelectric energy generation in California. She then worked at GTE Corporation and GTE Hawaiian Tel. During the 1990s, Hamamoto was as an investment banker with Goldman, Sachs & Co. and then at Merrill Lynch & Co, where she was a vice president in Corporate Finance.

When she was tapped by President Obama to serve as an ambassador, she was serving as trustee and advisor to educational institutions in California. Hamamoto served as a campaign bundler and fundraiser for Obama during the 2012 election.

When Hamamoto was sworn in by U.S. Vice President Joe Biden in May 2014, she became the 18th Permanent Representative of the United States of America to the United Nations and Other International Organizations in Geneva. She is the second woman to serve in this position since the 1950s. She resigned in January 2017, after President Trump took office.

Hamamoto is known as a champion of gender equality and the empowerment of women and girls. The U.S. Mission to the United Nations in Geneva has, with her leadership, initiated a program, "The Future She Deserves", to address gender-based violence, adolescent girls' health, economic empowerment and leadership opportunities.

Diplomatic posts
| Preceded by Betty E. King | United States Ambassador to the United Nations International Organizations in Geneva; 2014–2017 | Succeeded by Andrew Bremberg |
