= Warren W. Tichenor =

American diplomat

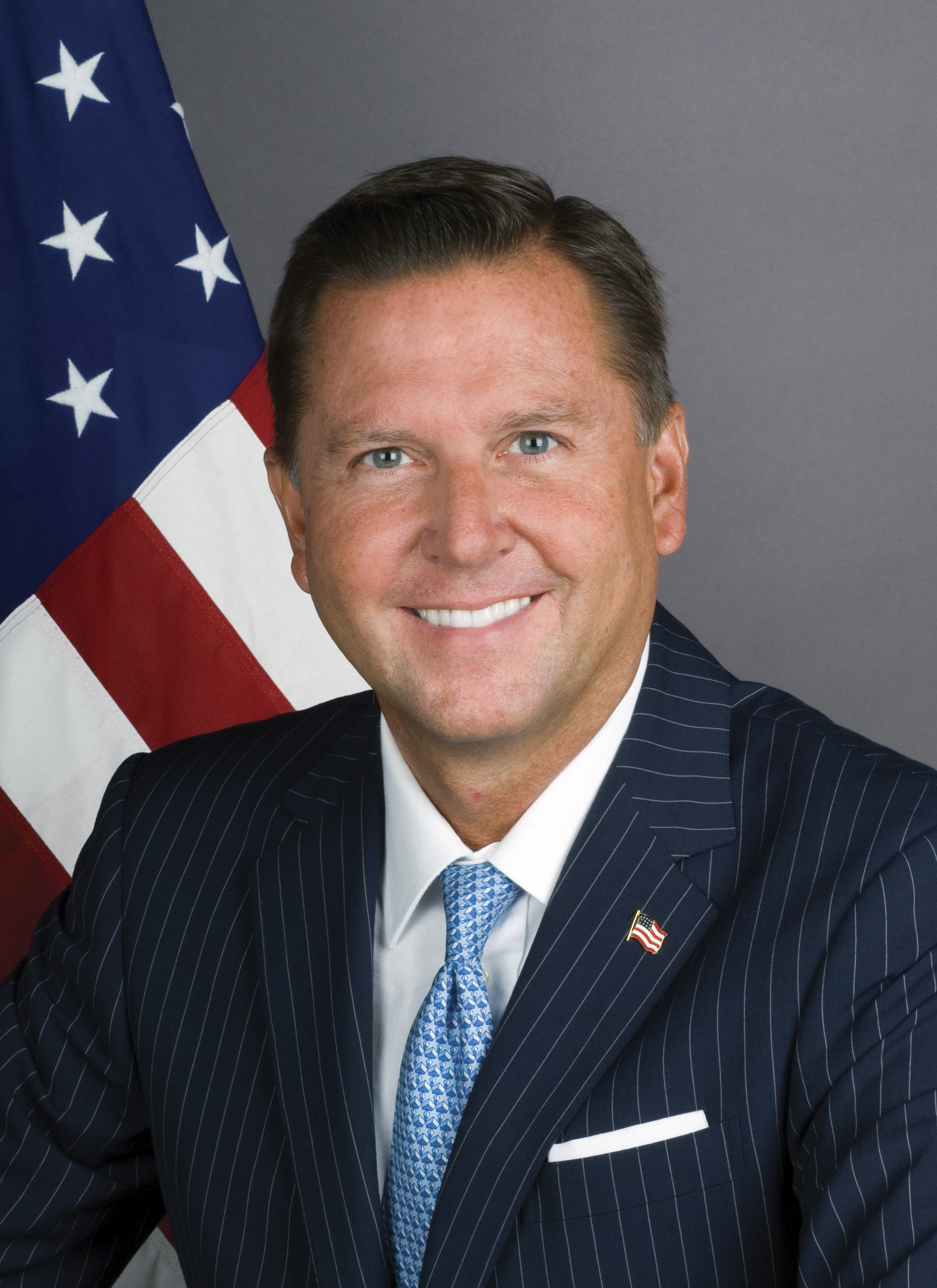

16th United States Ambassador to the United Nations International Organizations in Geneva
- In office June 12, 2006 – January 20, 2009
- President: George W. Bush
- Preceded by: Kevin Moley
- Succeeded by: Betty E. King

Personal details
- Born: 1960 (age 65–66) Harlingen, Texas
- Education: University of Southern California (BS)
- Occupation: Diplomat, businessman

Warren W. Tichenor (born in Harlingen, Texas in 1960) served as the 16th United States Ambassador to the United Nations International Organizations in Geneva. He served under president George W. Bush, and was sworn in on June 12, 2006 after being confirmed by a unanimous vote of the United States Senate on May 26, 2006.

During his tenure at the State Department, ambassador Tichenor led the United States Mission to the UN in Geneva in promoting and advancing United States policy before the United Nations, member states of the United Nations and the international organizations in Geneva.

Active in President Bush's presidential campaigns during the 2000 election, Tichenor was director of the Hispanic Campaign having served in a similar capacity in Bush's successful re-election campaign for governor of Texas in 1998.

Prior to that, he was President of W.W. Tichenor & Co. Inc, a San Antonio-based private investment firm. Tichenor began his career working in various positions in his family's media company, Tichenor Media System, Inc. The corporation was later known as Hispanic Broadcasting Corporation, the nation's largest owner-operator of Spanish-language stations. Hispanic Broadcasting merged in an all-stock transaction with Univision Communications, the largest Spanish television company in the U.S. in late 2003. The combined company which owns the U.S.’s top Spanish television network, Spanish cable network, Spanish radio group, Spanish record company, and Spanish language Internet portal was sold to a private equity consortium in 2007.

Tichenor is the president of W. W. Tichenor & Co., Inc. He has served on the Boards and in other capacities of various Civic, Political and Business organizations including on the President’s Council of the George W. Bush Presidential Library and Museum and on the Board of Advisors of the James A. Baker III Institute for Public Policy at Rice University.

A native Texan, born in Harlingen in 1960, Ambassador Tichenor graduated from the University of Southern California with a Bachelor of Science degree in 1982. The Ambassador and his wife, Rhonda, have a son, Warren II, and reside in San Antonio, Texas.

== See also ==
- United States Ambassador to the United Nations
- List of University of Southern California people

Diplomatic posts
Preceded by Kevin Moley	United States Ambassador to the United Nations International Organizations in Geneva; 2006–2009	Succeeded by Betty E. King
