= Texas's 58th House of Representatives district =

American legislative district

Texas's 58th State House of Representatives district
Representative
Helen Kerwin; R–Cleburne
- Demographics: 66.7% White; 4.8% Black; 23.4% Hispanic; 1.6% Asian
- Population (2020) • Voting age: 189,132; 140,933

The 58th district of the Texas House of Representatives contains all of Johnson and Somervell counties. The current representative is Helen Kerwin, who was first elected in 2024.

== Members ==
- Rob Orr
- DeWayne Burns
- Helen Kerwin

== Elections ==
(Sources:)

=== 2024 ===
2024 General Election
Party	Candidate	Votes	%
Republican	Helen Kerwin	63,760	82.54%
Libertarian	Richard Windmann	13,935	17.46%
Total votes		77,695	100%

2024 Republican Primary Runoff
Party	Candidate	Votes	%
Republican	Helen Kerwin	7,685	57.54%
Republican	DeWayne Burns	5,670	42.46%
Total votes		13,355	100%

2024 Republican Primary
Party	Candidate	Votes	%
Republican	Helen Kerwin	11,535	48.90%
Republican	DeWayne Burns	9,724	41.22%
Republican	Lyndon Laird	2,330	9.88%
Total votes		23,589	100%

=== 2022 ===
General election was cancelled, Incumbent DeWayne Burns was re-elected unopposed.

2022 Republican Primary
Party	Candidate	Votes	%
Republican	DeWayne Burns	15,323	100%
Total votes		15,323	100%

=== 2020 ===
2020 General Election
Party	Candidate	Votes	%
Republican	DeWayne Burns	62,176	79.04%
Democratic	Cindy Rocha	16,489	20.96%
Total votes		78,665	100%

2020 Republican Primary
Party	Candidate	Votes	%
Republican	DeWayne Burns	18,515	100%
Total votes		18,515	100%

2020 Democratic Primary
Party	Candidate	Votes	%
Democratic	Cindy Rocha	5,292	100%
Total votes		5,292	100%

=== 2018 ===
2018 General Election
Party	Candidate	Votes	%
Republican	DeWayne Burns	49,255	100%
Total votes		49,255	100%

2018 Republican Primary
Party	Candidate	Votes	%
Republican	DeWayne Burns	12,614	100%
Total votes		12,614	100%

=== 2016 ===
2016 General Election
Party	Candidate	Votes	%
Republican	DeWayne Burns	54,149	100%
Total votes		54,149	100%

2016 Republican Primary
Party	Candidate	Votes	%
Republican	DeWayne Burns	14,188	53.64%
Republican	Philip Eby	12,264	46.36%
Total votes		26,452	100%

=== 2014 ===
2014 General Election
Party	Candidate	Votes	%
Republican	DeWayne Burns	26,866	80.44%
Democratic	Greg A. Kauffman	6,532	19.56%
Total votes		33,398	100%

2014 Republican Primary Runoff
Party	Candidate	Votes	%
Republican	DeWayne Burns	5,142	53.41%
Republican	Philip Eby	4,485	46.59%
Total votes		9,627	100%

2014 Republican Primary
Party	Candidate	Votes	%
Republican	Philip Eby	5,499	40.15%
Republican	DeWayne Burns	4,162	30.39%
Republican	Henry W. Teich	3,100	22.63%
Republican	Lyndon Laird	936	6.83%
Total votes		13,697	100%

2014 Democratic Primary
Party	Candidate	Votes	%
Democratic	Greg A. Kauffman	1,304	100%
Total votes		1,304	100%

=== 2012 ===
2012 General Election
Party	Candidate	Votes	%
Republican	Rob Orr	45,861	100%
Total votes		45,861	100%

2012 Republican Primary
Party	Candidate	Votes	%
Republican	Rob Orr	10,512	100%
Total votes		10,512	100%

=== 2010 ===
2010 General Election
Party	Candidate	Votes	%
Republican	Rob Orr	27,537	75.73%
Democratic	John Greene	7,408	20.37%
Libertarian	Tom Stewart	1,418	3.90%
Total votes		36,363	100%

2010 Republican Primary
Party	Candidate	Votes	%
Republican	Rob Orr	10,089	68.01%
Republican	Ted Reynolds	4,746	31.99%
Total votes		14,835	100%

2010 Democratic Primary
Party	Candidate	Votes	%
Democratic	John Greene	1,767	100%
Total votes		1,767	100%

=== 2008 ===
2008 General Election
Party	Candidate	Votes	%
Republican	Rob Orr	39,697	70.55%
Democratic	Greg Allen Kauffman	14,749	26.21%
Libertarian	Tom Stewart	1,825	3.24%
Total votes		56,271	100%

2008 Republican Primary
Party	Candidate	Votes	%
Republican	Rob Orr	9,169	100%
Total votes		9,169	100%

2008 Democratic Primary
Party	Candidate	Votes	%
Democratic	Greg Allen Kauffman	10,097	100%
Total votes		10,097	100%

=== 2006 ===
2006 General Election
Party	Candidate	Votes	%
Republican	Rob Orr	21,766	62.76%
Democratic	Greg Allen Kauffman	11,419	32.92%
Libertarian	Tom Stewart	1,497	4.32%
Total votes		34,682	100%

2006 Republican Primary
Party	Candidate	Votes	%
Republican	Rob Orr	5,627	100%
Total votes		5,627	100%

2006 Democratic Primary
Party	Candidate	Votes	%
Democratic	Greg Allen Kauffman	1,261	100%
Total votes		1,261	100%

=== 2004 ===
2004 General Election
Party	Candidate	Votes	%
Republican	Rob Orr	37,001	69.79%
Democratic	Greg Allen Kauffman	16,020	30.21%
Total votes		53,021	100%

2004 Republican Primary Runoff
Party	Candidate	Votes	%
Republican	Rob Orr	4,630	60.42%
Republican	Sam Walls	3,033	39.58%
Total votes		7,663	100%

2004 Republican Primary
Party	Candidate	Votes	%
Republican	Sam Walls	3,518	41.63%
Republican	Rob Orr	2,774	32.83%
Republican	Scott Cain	2,158	25.54%
Total votes		8,450	100%

2004 Democratic Primary
Party	Candidate	Votes	%
Democratic	Greg Allen Kauffman	3,476	100%
Total votes		3,476	100%

=== 2002 ===
2002 General Election
Party	Candidate	Votes	%
Republican	Arlene Wohlgemuth	22,023	68.17%
Democratic	Greg Allen Kauffman	10,285	31.83%
Total votes		32,308	100%

2002 Republican Primary
Party	Candidate	Votes	%
Republican	Arlene Wohlgemuth	4,811	66.87%
Republican	Ron Crook	2,384	33.13%
Total votes		8,450	100%

2002 Democratic Primary
Party	Candidate	Votes	%
Democratic	Greg Allen Kauffman	1,796	55.90%
Democratic	Patrick G. Barkman	1,417	44.10%
Total votes		3,476	100%

=== 2000 ===
2000 General Election
Party	Candidate	Votes	%
Republican	Arlene Wohlgemuth	35,399	100%
Total votes		35,399	100%

2000 Republican Primary
Party	Candidate	Votes	%
Republican	Arlene Wohlgemuth	7,704	100%
Total votes		7,704	100%

=== 1998 ===
1998 General Election
Party	Candidate	Votes	%
Republican	Arlene Wohlgemuth	16,948	59.40%
Democratic	Gayle Appleby Ledbetter	11,585	40.60%
Total votes		28,533	100%

1998 Republican Primary
Party	Candidate	Votes	%
Republican	Arlene Wohlgemuth	3,215	100%
Total votes		3,215	100%

=== 1996 ===
1996 General Election
Party	Candidate	Votes	%
Republican	Arlene Wohlgemuth	21,487	53.92%
Democratic	Bernard Erickson	10,285	46.08%
Total votes		39,851	100%

1996 Republican Primary
Party	Candidate	Votes	%
Republican	Arlene Wohlgemuth	3,482	100%
Total votes		3,482	100%

1996 Democratic Primary
Party	Candidate	Votes	%
Democratic	Bernard Erickson	5,165	100%
Total votes		5,165	100%

=== 1994 ===
1994 General Election
Party	Candidate	Votes	%
Democratic	Bernard Erickson	21,487	53.92%
Republican	Arlene Wohlgemuth	10,285	46.08%
Total votes		39,851	100%

1994 Democratic Primary
Party	Candidate	Votes	%
Democratic	Bernard Erickson	6,795	100%
Total votes		6,795	100%

1994 Republican Primary
Party	Candidate	Votes	%
Republican	Arlene Wohlgemuth	2,084	100%
Total votes		2,084	100%

=== 1992 ===
1992 General Election
Party	Candidate	Votes	%
Republican	Bernard Erickson	21,487	58.00%
Democratic	Geneva Finstad	18,454	42.00%
Total votes		43,940	100%

1992 Democratic Primary
Party	Candidate	Votes	%
Democratic	Geneva Finstad	10,804	100%
Total votes		10,804	100%
