= Brooke Rollins =

American political advisor (born 1972)

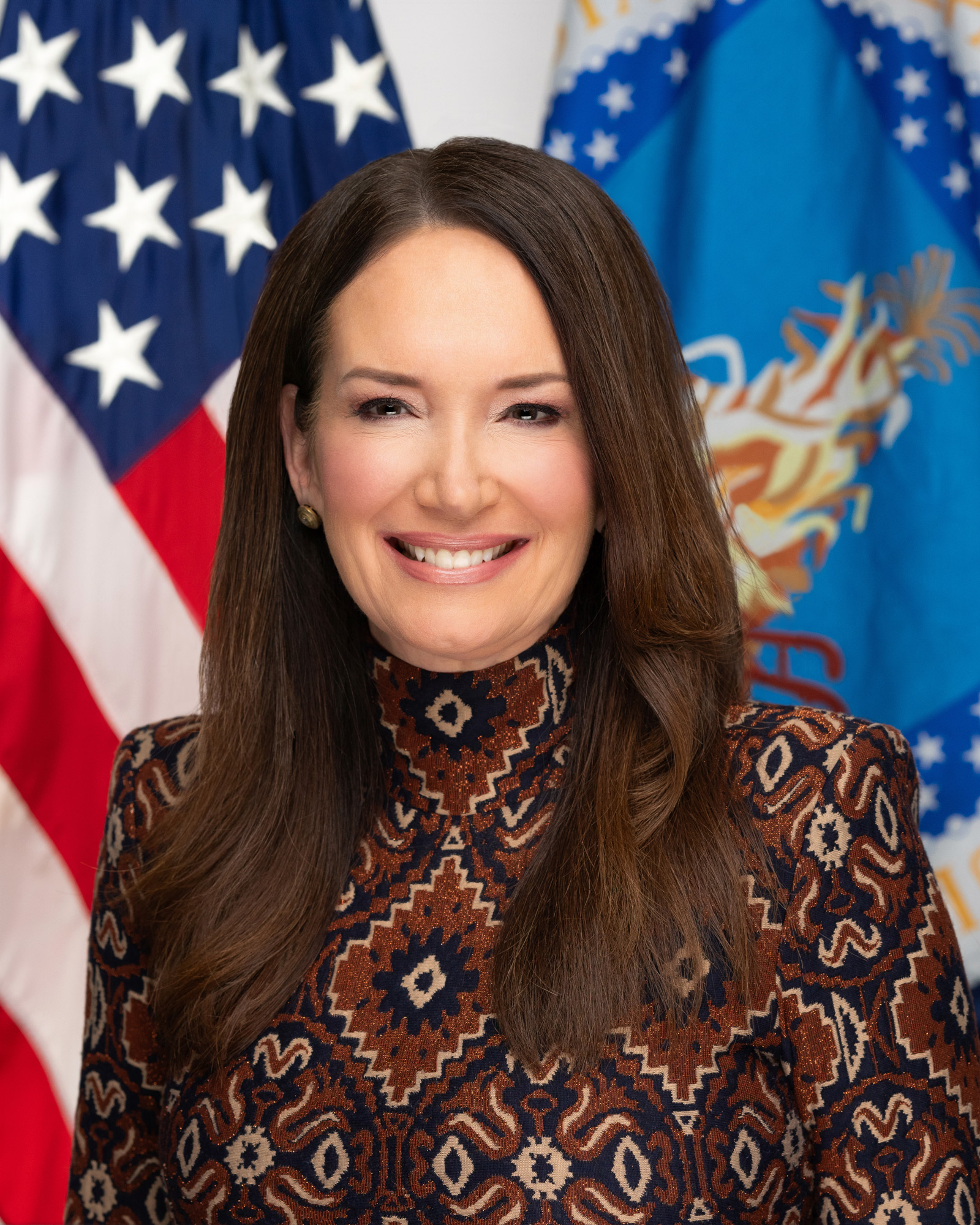
- Official portrait, 2025

33rd United States Secretary of Agriculture
- Incumbent
- Assumed office February 13, 2025
- President: Donald Trump
- Deputy: Stephen Vaden
- Preceded by: Tom Vilsack

Acting Director of the Domestic Policy Council
- In office May 24, 2020 – January 20, 2021
- President: Donald Trump
- Preceded by: Joe Grogan
- Succeeded by: Susan Rice

Director of the Office of American Innovation
- In office February 28, 2018 – May 24, 2020 Serving with Jared Kushner
- President: Donald Trump
- Preceded by: Reed Cordish
- Succeeded by: Office abolished

President of the Texas Public Policy Foundation
- In office January 1, 2003 – February 28, 2018
- Preceded by: Jeff Judson
- Succeeded by: Kevin Roberts

Personal details
- Born: Brooke Christine Leslie; April 10, 1972 (age 54) Glen Rose, Texas, U.S.
- Spouse: Mark Rollins (m. 1999)
- Children: 4
- Parent: Helen Kerwin (mother)
- Education: Texas A&M University (BS); University of Texas at Austin (JD)

Brooke Christine Leslie Rollins (née Leslie; born April 10, 1972) is an American political advisor and attorney who has served as the 33rd United States secretary of agriculture since 2025. Rollins served as the acting director of the Domestic Policy Council from 2020 to 2021 and as the director of the Office of American Innovation from 2018 to 2020.

Rollins graduated from Texas A&M University with a bachelor's degree in agricultural development and from the University of Texas at Austin with a Juris Doctor. She served as the deputy general counsel and the policy director of Rick Perry's reelection campaign in the 2002 Texas gubernatorial election. In 2003, Rollins became the president of the Texas Public Policy Foundation. In February 2018, President Donald Trump appointed Rollins as the co-director of the Office of American Innovation. In May 2020, she became the acting director of the Domestic Policy Council after Joe Grogan's resignation.

In 2021, Rollins established the America First Policy Institute alongside Larry Kudlow. She served as the institute's president and assisted in preparations for Trump's possible second presidential transition. In November 2024, Trump named Rollins as his nominee for secretary of agriculture. The Senate voted to confirm Rollins in February 2025.

== Early life and education (1972–1998) ==
Brooke Christine Leslie was born on April 10, 1972, in Dallas, Texas. Leslie was raised in Glen Rose. She was the oldest of three children born to Hugh and Helen Leslie. Hugh was the front office manager of a Hilton hotel in Saint Paul, while Helen managed a farm; they later divorced. Leslie assisted her mother in running a flower shop after the divorce. By 1989, Leslie had become the Area VIII president of Future Farmers of America and a member of 4-H. She began supporting conservatism after watching the first inauguration of Ronald Reagan. Leslie graduated from Glen Rose High School in 1990 and attended Texas A&M University as a pre-law student. By 1994, Leslie had become the student body president of the university, the first female to hold the position in its history. She later served as the speaker pro tempore of the student senate and as the chair of the Texas A&M Judicial Court. Rollins was also the Cotton Bowl Classic Queen. She graduated cum laude from Texas A&M University with a Bachelor of Science degree in agricultural development and from the University of Texas School of Law with a Juris Doctor.

== Career ==
=== Early career (1999–2003) ===
By April 1999, Leslie had become an attorney for Hughes and Luce. In June, she married Mark Rollins; they have four children. In the 2002 Texas gubernatorial election, she served as Governor Rick Perry's deputy general counsel for his campaign. In February 2002, the campaign named her as his policy director.

=== Texas Public Policy Foundation (2003–2018) ===
In December 2002, after receiving a recommendation from Perry, the Texas Public Policy Foundation named Rollins as its president. She began serving in the position the following month. In 2007, Rollins became the first female speaker at the College Station Aggie Muster, which honors deceased Texas A&M former students.

As the Texas Public Policy Foundation's president, Rollins led the politically declining institution to relevance; The Texas Observer wrote that the foundation had become a "bedrock institution of the Texas right" by 2011. Her policy work included criminal justice reform. Rollins increased the number of staffers from three to one hundred. In 2011, Texas Monthly named her as one of the twenty-five most powerful Texans. Rollins left the Texas Public Policy Foundation in 2018.

=== Trump administration work (2016–2021) ===
In August 2016, Donald Trump named Rollins to his economic advisory council. In February 2018, the real estate developer Reed Cordish resigned from his position as the director of the Office of American Innovation. The Trump administration appointed Rollins to succeed Cordish that month. At the office, she worked with Jared Kushner on prison reform legislation. In an effort to assert his authority, Kushner proposed appointing Rollins as the director of the Domestic Policy Council, a move that would have her control most domestic issues for the Trump administration with the exception of immigration. Mick Mulvaney's appointment as the acting White House chief of staff secured the position for the political advisor Joe Grogan, a Mulvaney appointee. As a federal government shutdown continued into January 2019, Kushner and Rollins began working on a long-term immigration proposal that would end the shutdown.

Rollins, alongside Ja'Ron Smith, coordinated with the Department of Housing and Urban Development on responding to the effects of the COVID-19 pandemic on minorities. Rollins had a key role in Trump's criminal justice reform agenda, including in developing the First Step Act. In May 2020, The New York Times reported that Trump was set to name Rollins as the acting director of the Domestic Policy Council following the resignation of Joe Grogan. Although Trump advisors had largely agreed to appoint Derek Lyons to the position, Rollins was viewed as a candidate who could appear on television. As protests against police brutality emerged across the United States that month, Rollins stated that the Trump administration would seek to fix divisions within the country. She was involved in policy planning for Trump's presumptive second term and had begun to organize transition planning alongside Chris Liddell, the White House deputy chief of staff for policy coordination, by September. Rollins was a member of Trump's 1776 Commission and helped produce its report.

=== America First Policy Institute (2021–2024) ===
In December 2020, following Donald Trump's loss in the 2020 presidential election, Politico reported that Rollins and Larry Kudlow, the director of the National Economic Council, were working on an organization to promote Trump's policies. By March 2021, the organization, the America First Policy Institute (AFPI), had hired approximately thirty staffers. The institute was formally established the following month. Rollins served as the president and chief executive of AFPI until March 2025. She was closely involved in efforts to prepare for Trump's possible second presidential transition; in October 2024, Politico Magazine wrote that Rollins had taken the "reins of the transition" through her work with the AFPI.

== United States Secretary of Agriculture (2025–present) ==
=== Nomination and confirmation ===
According to Bloomberg News, Rollins had been considered as a possible candidate for White House chief of staff as early as July 2022, in the event that Donald Trump ran for president. In October 2024, The New York Times reported that Trump had considered Rollins as his White House chief of staff. After his victory in the 2024 presidential election, Trump named campaign manager Susie Wiles as his chief of staff.

On November 23, 2024, Trump named Rollins as his nominee to serve as the secretary of agriculture, completing his cabinet. According to Politico, the decision was unexpected among Trump's advisors and occurred after CNN had reported that Trump was set to name former Georgia senator Kelly Loeffler to the position. Some agriculture industry officials viewed Rollins positively as a possible counter to Robert F. Kennedy Jr., Trump's nominee for secretary of health and human services, who held views critical of pesticides and industrial livestock production systems. According to The Wall Street Journal, Kennedy's staffers had neither Loeffler nor Rollins on their list of possible nominees for secretary of agriculture. Politico perceived the nomination as a maneuver that tempered Kennedy's policy reach.

Rollins met with senators in December 2024. She was among several nominees whose nominations were delayed after the Trump administration did not initially provide Senate committees with Federal Bureau of Investigation background checks and ethics paperwork. Rollins appeared before the Senate Committee on Agriculture, Nutrition, and Forestry on January 23, 2025. Amid uncertainty over Trump's tariff and immigration policy, Rollins stated that she would provide relief to farmers, particularly those in rural communities. She supported Trump's mass deportation efforts. Rollins vowed to support corn ethanol. The Senate Committee on Agriculture, Nutrition, and Forestry unanimously voted to advance Rollins's nomination on February 3. The Senate voted to confirm Rollins in a 72–28 vote on February 13.

=== Tenure ===
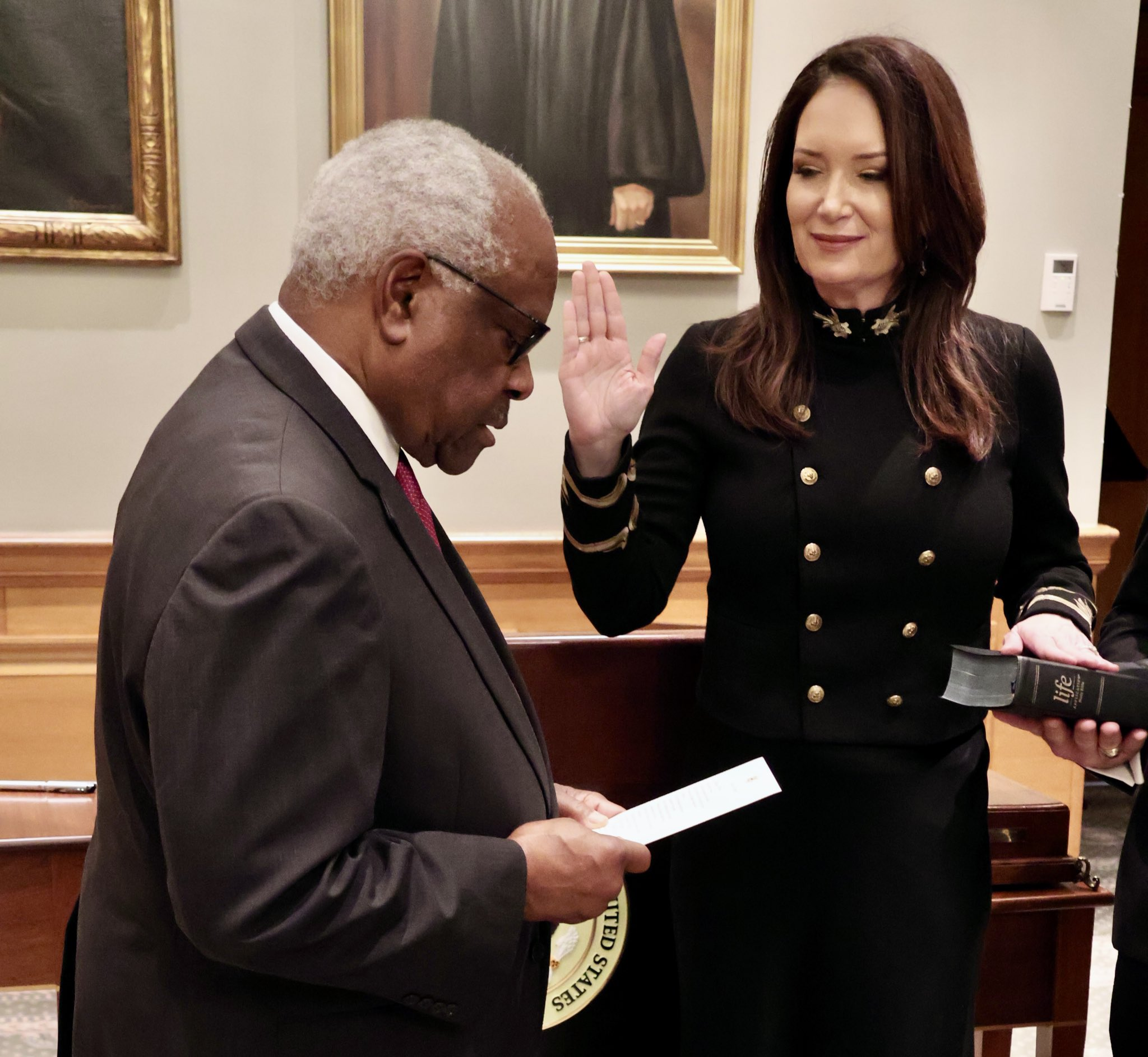
Rollins is sworn in by Justice Clarence Thomas in February 2025

Rollins was sworn in hours after she was confirmed by the Senate. Her tenure occurred amid an H5N1 outbreak; Rollins stated that she convened a meeting on the disease on her first day as the secretary of agriculture. Rollins's initial moves included championing the Department of Government Efficiency, rescinding diversity, equity, and inclusion programs, and instituting mass layoffs across the Department of Agriculture. She released funding for several agricultural grants as the Office of Management and Budget froze numerous federal grants. Rollins served on the MAHA Commission. In April, Rollins sent a letter to Maine governor Janet Mills stating that funding from the Department of Agriculture for education programs would be frozen. That month, she removed environmental protections for nearly sixty percent of national forests.

In June 2025, The New York Times reported that Rollins had told Trump some farmers were concerned that Immigration and Customs Enforcement raids were harming their businesses. Trump later posted on Truth Social that he was ordering the agency to pause raids and arrests at farms, hotels, and restaurants. That month, she rescinded a rule preventing road construction and timber harvesting in some areas on federal forestland. In a memorandum in July, Rollins moved to relocate most of the Department of Agriculture's remaining works to the agency's five regional offices. In August 2025, Rollins announced a policy change to disqualify renewable energy projects from loans under the Rural Energy for America Program.

As the Trump administration conflicted with Minnesota officials, Rollins requested that the state recertify many Supplemental Nutrition Assistance Program recipients in a letter in December. Minnesota sued Rollins over the letter. The following month, she froze food stamp funding to Minnesota. In January 2026, Rollins ended several regulations on oil and gas drilling on Forest Service land. In April, she issued an order removing environmental protections on some land.

In November 2026, federal judge Trina Thompson ruled that Rollins had likely violated the First Amendment by sending Christian religious emails to department employees. Thompson found that the Establishment Clause limited how Rollins could express her religious beliefs in her official role. The lawsuit was brought by seven department employees, the National Federation of Federal Employees, and Americans United for Separation of Church and State. A USDA spokesperson said the department was considering an appeal, calling the ruling "a completely unprecedented attempt to muzzle a cabinet secretary."

Political offices
Preceded by Joe Grogan	Director of the Domestic Policy Council; Acting; 2020–2021	Succeeded by Susan Rice
Preceded by Tom Vilsack	United States Secretary of Agriculture; 2025–present	Incumbent
Order of precedence
Preceded by Doug Burgum as United States Secretary of the Interior	Order of precedence of the United States as Secretary of Agriculture	Succeeded by Howard Lutnick as United States Secretary of Commerce
U.S. presidential line of succession
Preceded by Doug Burgum as United States Secretary of the Interior	Ninth in line as Secretary of Agriculture	Succeeded by Howard Lutnick as United States Secretary of Commerce
