= Alexandria Times =

Weekly newspaper in Alexandria, Virginia, USA

- Alexandria's only independent hometown newspaper.
- The front page on May 11, 2023
- Type: Weekly newspaper
- Founder: John H. Arundel
- Publisher: Denise Dunbar
- Founded: 2005
- Circulation: 20,000 weekly
- Website: alextimes.com
- Free online archives: alextimes.com/category/archives/

Alexandria Times is a newspaper in Alexandria, Virginia, focusing on investigative reporting, hard news, sports, business and events in the city of Alexandria. It was started to provide an additional alternative to the current local papers and to include more "hard news" coverage. The Times was bought by Alexandria Community Media, a 501(c)(3) nonprofit, on September 5, 2025. Though a nonprofit, the Times does not have a paywall and is accessible to all. It relies on advertising revenue, donations, and grants for revenue.

== Overview ==
Founded in 2005 by a group of residents led by John Arundel, the newspaper is a free weekly with both home delivery in seven zip codes and bulk availability in newspaper boxes in 13 zip codes in the City of Alexandria, Arlington County and the Alexandria portion of Fairfax County. It was sold to a group of investors in January 2009, led by John Ariail, which also included Denise and William Dunbar. The Times prints around 15,000 copies of the paper each week, and has 5,000 more subscribers to its weekly newsletter. The Times has received increasing acclaim in recent years for its investigative reporting and has won 54 Virginia Press Association awards for work done from 2022 through 2025. The publisher and executive editor is Denise Dunbar. The current managing editor is Sydney Kodama.

== See also ==
- Mari Stull
