= Rowland G. Freeman III =

11th Administrator of the General Services Administration
- In office July 2, 1979 – January 14, 1981
- President: Jimmy Carter
- Preceded by: Jay Solomon
- Succeeded by: Gerald P. Carmen

Personal details
- Born: February 11, 1922 New York City, New York
- Died: November 29, 2014 (aged 92) Williamsburg, Virginia
- Party: Republican
- Education: University of Massachusetts Amherst (BA); Harvard Business School (MBA)

Rowland G. Freeman III (February 11, 1922 – November 29, 2014) was an American United States Navy officer who served as Administrator of the General Services Administration from 1979 to 1981.

He died on November 29, 2014, in Williamsburg, Virginia at age 92.
