= Gerald B. Helman =

Career Foreign Service Officer (1932–2020)

Gerald Bernard Helman (November 4, 1932 Detroit, Michigan - October 16, 2020 Alexandria, Virginia), was a Career Foreign Service Officer who was Representative of the United States to the European Office of the United Nations from 1979 until 1981 with the rank of ambassador. Helman was also Deputy Under Secretary of State (1982-1991).

== Biography ==
Helman, the son of Jewish immigrants from Russia (near Minsk, in modern-day Belarus), attended Cass Technical High School (class of 1949), the University of Michigan (class of 1953) and the University of Michigan Law School (class of 1956). While an undergraduate, he met Dolores “Dolly” Hamel whom he later married and was editor of The Michigan Daily. In 1973 and 1974, Helman was a Woodrow Wilson Fellow at Princeton University.

In his diplomatic career, he worked for both the UN and NATO in political affairs and was involved in the negotiations for the Outer Space Treaty and Camp David Accords.
