= Joseph Carlton Petrone =

U.S. Army colonel

Joseph Carlton Petrone (November 30, 1922 Marshalltown, Iowa - March 24, 2016 Naples, Florida) was an American Army Colonel and the Representative of the United States to the European Office of the United Nations in Geneva.

== Personal life ==
A 1944 West Point graduate, Petrone served as a lieutenant in George Patton's 3rd Army in the Battle of the Bulge. In the United States, Petrone was a White House military aide under President Eisenhower and assistant military attaché to France. He retired from the army in 1970 having achieved the rank of colonel.

Petrone died at his home in Naples. He and his wife Augusta Henderson also lived in Dublin, New Hampshire.
