= Kevin Moley =

American businessman and government official

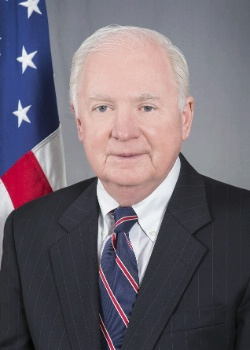
- Official portrait, 2018

27th Assistant Secretary of State for International Organization Affairs
- In office March 29, 2018 – November 29, 2019
- President: Donald Trump
- Preceded by: Bathsheba Nell Crocker
- Succeeded by: Michele J. Sison

15th United States Ambassador to the United Nations International Organizations in Geneva
- In office October 1, 2001 – April 30, 2006
- President: George W. Bush
- Preceded by: George Moose
- Succeeded by: Warren W. Tichenor

United States Deputy Secretary of Health and Human Services
- In office 1992–1993
- President: George H. W. Bush
- Preceded by: Constance Horner
- Succeeded by: Walter Broadnax

Assistant Secretary of Health and Human Services (Management and Budget)
- In office 1989–1992
- President: George H.W. Bush

Military service
- Allegiance: United States
- Branch/service: United States Marine Corps
- Years of service: 1965–1971
- Rank: Sergeant
- Awards: Purple Heart; Navy Commendation Medal

Kevin Edward Moley is an American businessman and government official. He served in several government positions, including Deputy Secretary of Health and Human Services from 1992 to 1993 and Assistant Secretary of State for International Organization Affairs from 2018 to 2019.

== Career ==
Moley is the former Ambassador to the U.S. Mission to the United Nations in Geneva. He also served in other government positions, including in the U.S. Department of Health and Human Services and Health Care Financing Administration, worked in several Republican political campaigns, and in the private sector. Moley also served in the United States Marine Corps from 1965 to 1971, rising to the rank of sergeant and receiving a Purple Heart and a Navy Commendation Medal.

=== Assistant Secretary of State ===
The United States Senate confirmed Moley to the post of Assistant Secretary of State for International Organization Affairs on March 22, 2018, by voice vote, and he assumed office on March 29, 2018. He succeeded Bathsheba N. Crocker.

In August 2019, the investigative political website Politico alleged Moley had engaged in "disrespectful and hostile treatment" of staffers. This reporting was substantiated by an Inspector General's report which found that leadership including Moley had failed to meet leadership and management standards. The report criticized Moley for demanding first class accommodation on a trip that did not qualify for first class accommodations based on department policy and reprimanding staff for “not fighting hard enough” to find a way to accommodate his request. Moley reportedly also removed a principal deputy assistant secretary after she raised concerns about Mari Stull’s treatment of employees. In October 2019 Senator Bob Menendez called for Secretary of State Mike Pompeo to fire Moley.

In October 2019, Moley announced he would step down from his position on November 29.

== See also ==
- Mari Stull

Diplomatic posts
Preceded by George Moose	United States Ambassador to the United Nations International Organizations in Geneva; 2001–2006	Succeeded by Warren W. Tichenor
Government offices
Preceded by Bathsheba Nell Crocker	Assistant Secretary of State for International Organization Affairs; 2018–2019	Succeeded by Jonathan Moore (acting)
