= Geoffrey Swaebe =

American businessman and diplomat (1911–1997)

Geoffrey Swaebe (March 23, 1911 – February 18, 1997) was a British-born American department store executive and diplomat who served as the U.S. ambassador to Belgium.

== Life and career ==
Swaebe was born in London on March 23, 1911. He came to the United States, settling in Boston, when he was 12. Instead of going to college, he worked for Florsheim Shoes. He worked his way up to executive positions not just with Florsheim but I. Miller & Sons in Chicago, Thalheimers Department Store in Richmond, Virginia, Pizitz Department Store in Birmingham, Alabama and, from 1950 to 1962, with the Hecht Company in Baltimore. When the May Company took over Hecht's, Swaebe moved to Los Angeles in 1962 to president and chairman of its regional operations. In 1972, he left to set up his own management consulting company. For a short time, he moved to New York to be chief executive of Abercrombie & Fitch during the store's bankruptcy proceedings.

In 1981, Ronald Reagan appointed him United States' representative at the United Nations in Geneva. While Ambassador to Belgium, he needed to negotiate with the Belgians to not back out of an agreement to accept American cruise missiles on Belgian soil as part of a NATO strategy.
