= Endorsements in the 2004 Democratic Party presidential primaries =

This is a list of endorsements for declared candidates in the Democratic primaries for the 2004 United States presidential election.

== Aggregate Endorsement Maps ==
Endorsements by Democrats in the House of Representatives (January 14, 2004).
John Kerry
John Edwards
Howard Dean
Wesley Clark
Joe Lieberman
Dick Gephardt
Carol Mosley Braun
Al Sharpton
Dennis Kucinich
Declined to Endorse or Unknown
Non-Party Representative

== Major Candidates ==
=== John Kerry ===
U.S. Cabinet Officials (Former)
- Henry Cisneros, U.S. Sec. of HUD (1993–1997)
- Robert Reich, U.S. Sec. of Labor (1993–1997)
U.S. Senate
- Jeff Bingaman, New Mexico CL-1 (1983-2013)
- Maria Cantwell, Washington CL-1 (2001-Present)
- Jon Corzine, New Jersey CL-1 (2001-2006)
- Dianne Feinstein, California CL-1 (1992-2023)
- Bob Graham, Florida CL-3 (1987-2005)
- Fritz Hollings, South Carolina CL-3 (1966-2005)
- Daniel Inouye, Hawaii CL-3 (1963-2012)
- Ted Kennedy, Massachusetts CL-1 (1962-2009)
- Herb Kohl, Wisconsin CL-1 (1989-2013)
- Carl Levin, Michigan CL-2 (1979-2015)
- Barbara Mikulski, Maryland CL-3 (1987-2017)
- Jay Rockefeller, West Virginia CL-2 (1985-2015)
- Paul Sarbanes, Maryland CL-1 (1977-2007)
- Debbie Stabenow, Michigan CL-1 (2001-2025)
U.S. Senate (Former)
- Max Cleland, Georgia CL-2 (1997-2003)
- Gary Hart, Colorado CL-3 (1975-1987)
- George J. Mitchell, Maine CL-1 (1980-1995)
U.S. House of Representatives
- Brian Baird, Washington 3rd (1999-2011)
- Tim Bishop, New York 1st (2003-2015)
- Earl Blumenauer, Oregon 3rd (1996-2025)
- Mike Capuano, Massachusetts (1999-2019)
- Ben Cardin, Maryland 3rd (1987-2007)
- Jim Clyburn, South Carolina 6th (1993-Present)
- Bill Delahunt, Massachusetts 10th (1997-2011)
- Ed Pastor, Arizona (1991-2015)
- Elijah Cummings, Maryland's 7th (1996-2019)
- Diana DeGette, Colorado's 1st (1997-Present)
- Norm Dicks, Washington 6th (1977-2013)
- John Dingell, Michigan (1955-2015)
- Harold Ford Jr., Tennessee 9th (1997-2007)
- Barney Frank, Massachusetts 4th (1981-2013)
- Rubén Hinojosa, Texas 15th (1997-2017)
- Chris Van Hollen, Maryland 8th (2003-2017)
- Steny Hoyer, Maryland 5th (1981-Present)
- Jay Inslee, Washington (1993-1995, 1999-2012)
- Ron Kind, Wisconsin 3rd (1997-2023)
- Norm Dicks, Washington 2nd (2001-Present)
- Sander Levin, Michigan (1983-2019)
- John Lewis, Georgia 5th (1987-2020)
- Nita Lowey, New York (1989-2021)
- Stephen Lynch, Massachusetts (2001-Present)
- Carolyn Maloney, New York (1993-2023)
- Ed Markey, Massachusetts (1976-2013)
- Carolyn McCarthy, New York 4th (2003-2015)
- Jim McGovern, Massachusetts (1997-Present)
- Denise Majette, Georgia 4th (2003-2005)
- Marty Meehan, Massachusetts 5th (1993-2007)
- Kendrick Meek, Florida 17th (2003-2011)
- Gregory Meeks, New York (1998-Present)
- Juanita Millender-McDonald, California 37th (1996-2007)
- Richard Neal, Massachusetts (1989-Present)
- Dave Obey, Wisconsin 7th (1969-2011)
- John Olver, Massachusetts (1969-1973, 1991-2013)
- Ciro Rodriguez, Texas (1997-2005, 2007-2011)
- Dutch Ruppersberger, Maryland 2nd (2003-2025)
- Louise Slaughter, New York (1987-2018)
- Adam Smith, Washington 9th (1997-Present)
- John F. Tierney, Massachusetts 6th (1997-2015)
- Mark Udall, Colorado 2nd (1999-2009)
- Tom Udall, New Mexico 3rd (1999-2009)
U.S. House of Representatives (Former)
- Lynn Schenk, California 49th (1993-1995)
Governors
- John Baldacci, Maine (2003–2011)
- Gary Locke, Washington (1997-2005)
- Janet Napolitano, Arizona (2003–2011)
- Jennifer Granholm, Michigan (2003–2011)
Governors (Former)
- Ben Cayetano, Hawaii (1994–2002)
State Officials
- Phil Angelides, State Treasurer (CA) (1999–2007)
- John D. Cherry, Lt. Governor (MI) (2003-2011)
- J. Joseph Curran Jr., Attorney General (MD) (1978–2007)
- Patty Judge, Sec. of Agriculture (IA) (1999–2007)
- Tom Miller, Attorney General (IA) (1979–1991, 1995–2023)
- William D. Schaefer, Comptroller (MD) (1999–2007)
- Eliot Spitzer, Attorney General (NY) (1999-2006)
- Steve Westly, Comptroller (CA) (2003–2007)
Mayors
- Martin O'Malley, Baltimore, Maryland (1999-2007)
State Legislators
- Michael E. Busch, State Del. Speaker (MD) (1987-2019)
- Ben Luján, State Hse. Speaker (NM) (1975-2012)
Local Officials
- Doug Duncan, CE of Montgomery County (MD) (1994-2006)
- James N. Robey, CE of Howard County (MD) (1998-2006)
- Joe Shirley Jr., President of the Navajo Nation (2003-2011)
- James T. Smith Jr., CE of Baltimore County (MD) (2002-2010)
- Antonio Villaraigosa, CM for Los Angeles (CA) (2000-2005)
Party Officials (Former)
- Lawrence H. Framme III, State Chair (VA) (2000-2003)
Activists and Public Figures
- Christie Vilsack, First Lady of Iowa (1999-2007)
- Lyndon LaRouche, Head of the NCLC (1969-2019)
- Gerald McEntee, President of the AFSCME (1981-2012)
Business Executives and Leaders
- Mark Gorenberg, Venture Capitalist
- Irwin M. Jacobs, CEO of Qualcomm (1985-2005)
- Richard Ziman, CEO of 'Arden Realty, Inc.' (1990-2006)
Entertainment and Sports Personalities
- Jason Alexander, Actor and Comedian
- Jennifer Aniston, Actress
- Christina Applegate, Actress
- Babyface, Singer-Songwriter
- James Brolin, Actor and Director
- Kevin Costner, Actor and Filmmaker
- Ted Danson, Actor
- Larry David, Comedian, Writer and Actor
- Tom DeLonge, Musician
- Danny Devito, Actor and Filmmaker
- Leonardo DiCaprio, Actor
- Dustin Hoffman, Actor and Filmmaker
- Quincy Jones, Composer and Music Producer
- Carole King, Singer-Songwriter and Musician
- Tobey Maguire, Actor
- Moby, Musician, Songwriter and Animal Rights Activist
- Rhea Perlman, Actress
- Brad Pitt, Actor
- Jerry Seinfeld, Comedian, Actor and Writer
- Aaron Sorkin, Screenwriter, Playwright and Filmmaker
- Mary Steenburgen, Actress, Comedian and Singer-Songwriter
- Oliver Stone, Filmmaker
- Sharon Stone, Actress
- Barbra Streisand, Singer, Actress and Songwriter
- James Taylor, Singer-Songwriter and Guitarist
- Kathleen Turner, Actress
- John Williams, Composer and Conductor
- Peter Yarrow, Singer-Songwriter
Organizations
- AFT
Newspapers and Publications
- New York Daily News
- Newsday
- Times Union
- Los Angeles Daily News
- San Francisco Chronicle
- The San Bernardino Sun
- The Baltimore Sun
- St. Paul Pioneer Press
- Boston Herald
- Akron Beacon Journal
- The Atlanta Journal-Constitution
- Iowa City Press-Citizen
- The Hawk Eye

=== Dennis Kucinich (to July 22, 2004) ===
U.S. House of Representatives
- Lynn Woolsey, California 6th (1993-2013)
State Legislators
- Ed Fallon, State Rep. (IA) (1993-2006)
- John Marty, State Sen. (MN) (1987-Present)
State Legislators (Former)
- Tom Hayden, State Sen. (CA) (1992-2000)
- Niilo Koponen, State Rep. (AK) (1983-1992)
Activists and Public Figures
- Arun M. Gandhi, Author and Socio-Political Activist
- John Hagelin, Leader of the American (TM) Movement
- John Robbins, Author and Vegan Activist
- Paul Schrade, Trade Union Activist
Entertainment and Sports Personalities
- Ben Affleck, Actor
- Ed Asner, Actor
- Peter Coyote, Actor, Director and Author
- James Cromwell, Actor
- Ani DiFranco, Singer-Songwriter
- Lila Garrett, Screenwriter and Radio Host
- Danny Glover, Actor
- Elliott Gould, Actor
- Willie Nelson, Singer, Songwriter, Guitarist and Activist
- Joaquin Phoenix, Actor
- Roy Scheider, Actor
- Michelle Shocked, Singer-Songwriter
- Studs Terkel, Actor, Writer and Historian
Organizations
- U.S. Marijuana Party
Newspapers and Publications
- San Francisco Bay Guardian

=== Al Sharpton (to March 15, 2004) ===
U.S. House of Representatives
- José E. Serrano, New York (1990-2021)
- Edolphus Towns, New York (1983-2013)
State Legislators
- Adam C. Powell IV, State Assm. (NY) (2001-2010)
Mayors
- Sharpe James, Newark, New Jersey (1986-2006)
Local Officials
- Charles Barron, CM for New York City (2002-2013, 2022-2023)
- Larry Seabrook, CM for New York City (2002-2012)
- José M. Serrano, CM for New York City (2002-2005)
Local Officials (Former)
- Percy Sutton, Bro. for Manhattan (NY) (1966-1977)
Academic Community
- Charles Ogletree, Legal Scholar
- Cornel West, Philosopher, Theologian, and Political Activist
Public Figures and Activists
- Louis Farrakhan, Leader of the Nation of Islam (1981-Present)
- Michael Hardy, Civil Rights Attorney
- Abner Louima, Social Activist
Business Executives and Leaders
- Napoleon Brandford III, Investment Banker
- Sean Combs, Founder of Bad Boy Records
- Earl G. Graves Sr., CEO of Black Enterprise Magazine (1970-2006)
- Cathy Hughes, Chair of Radio One (1980-Present)
- Robert L. Johnson, CEO of BET (1979-2006)
- Russell Simmons, Chair of Rush Communications (1983-Present)
Entertainers and Sports Personalities
- Tom Joyner, Radio Personality
- Jay-Z, Rapper

=== John Edwards (to March 2, 2004) ===
U.S. House of Representatives
- Frank Ballance, North Carolina 1st (2003–2004)
- Bob Etheridge, North Carolina 2nd (1997–2011)
- Chaka Fattah, Pennsylvania 2nd (1995-2016)
- Bernice Johnson, Texas 30th (1993–2023)
- Mike McIntyre, North Carolina 7th (1997–2015)
- Brad Miller, North Carolina 13th (2003–2013)
- David Price, North Carolina 4th (1987–1995, 1997-2023)
- Ike Skelton, Missouri 4th (1977–2011)
- Mel Watt, North Carolina 12th (1993–2014)
- Albert Wynn, Maryland 4th (1993–2008)
Governors
- Mike Easley, North Carolina (2001-2009)
Governors (Former)
- Roy Barnes, Georgia (1999-2003)
- Jim Hunt, North Carolina (1977-1985, 1993-2001)
State Legislators
- John Burton, State Sen. Pro. Tem. (CA) (1996-2004)
- Richard Miranda, State Sen. (AZ) (2003-2011)
- Wally Straughn, State Rep. (AZ) (2003-2005)
Activists and Public Figures
- Thomas Girardi, Attorney
Business Executives and Leaders
- Casey Wasserman, CEO of Wasserman Group (2002-Present)
Entertainment and Sports Personalities
- Glenn Close, Actress
- Larry David, Comedian, Writer and Actor
- Jennifer Garner, Actress
- Dennis Hopper, Actor, and Film Director
- Ashton Kutcher, Actor
- Barbra Streisand, Singer, Songwriter and Actress
- Rita Wilson, Actress and Singer
- Jerry Zucker, Filmmaker
Newspapers and Publications
- The Des Moines Register

=== Howard Dean (to February 18, 2004) ===
U.S. Cabinet Officials (Former)
- Bruce Babbitt, U.S. Sec. of the Interior (1993-2001)
- Al Gore, U.S. Vice President (1993-2001)
U.S. Senate
- Tom Harkin, Iowa CL-2 (1985-2015)
- Jim Jeffords, Vermont CL-1 (1989-2007) (Ind.)
- Patrick Leahy, Vermont CL-3 (1975-2023)
U.S. Senate (Former)
- Bill Bradley, New Jersey CL-2 (1979-1997)
- Carol Moseley Braun, Illinois CL-3 (1993-1999)
- Howard Metzenbaum, Ohio CL-1 (1974, 1976-1995)
U.S. House of Representatives
- Neil Abercrombie, Hawaii 1st (1986-1987, 1991-2010)
- Xavier Becerra, California (1993-2017)
- Corrine Brown, Florida (1993-2017)
- John Conyers, Michigan (1965-2017)
- Tim Ryan, Ohio (2003-2023)
- Bob Filner, California (1993-2012)
- Raúl Grijalva, Arizona (2003-2025)
- Rush Holt Jr., New Jersey 12th (1999-2015)
- Maurice Hinchey, New York (1993-2013)
- Jesse Jackson Jr., Illinois 2nd (1995-2012)
- Carolyn C. Kilpatrick, Michigan (1997-2011)
- Sheila Jackson Lee, Texas 18th (1995-2024)
- Zoe Lofgren, California (1995-Present)
- Jim McDermott, Washington 7th (1989-2017)
- Bob Menendez, New Jersey 13th (1993-2006)
- Alan Mollohan, West Virginia 1st (1983-2011)
- Jim Moran, Virginia's 8th (1991-2015)
- Jerry Nadler, New York (1992-Present)
- Grace Napolitano, California (1999-2025)
- Major Owens, New York (1983-2007)
- Frank Pallone, New Jersey (1988-Present)
- Nick Rahall, West Virginia (1977-2015)
- Lucille Roybal-Allard, California (1993-2023)
- Loretta Sanchez, California (1997-2017)<ref">"Rep. Loretta Sanchez Endorses Howard Dean". Desert Dispatch. December 10, 2003.</ref>
- Jan Schakowsky, Illinois 9th (1999-Present)
- Bobby Scott, Virginia 3rd (1993-Present)
- Hilda Solis, California (2001-2009)
- Bennie Thompson, Mississippi 2nd (1993-Present)
- Nydia Velázquez, New York (1993-Present)
- Diane Watson, California (2001-2011)
- David Wu, Oregon 1st (1999-2011)
Governors
- Jim McGreevey, New Jersey (2002-2004)
Governors (Former)
- Ben Cayetano, Hawaii (1994-2002)
- Jim Folsom Jr., Alabama (1993-1995)
- David Walters, Oklahoma (1991-1995)
- Lowell Weicker, Connecticut (1991-1995) (Ind.)
State Officials
- Mike Thurmond, Cmmr. of Labor (GA) (1999-2011)
State Officials (Former)
- Don Beyer, Lt. Governor (VA) (1990-1998)
State Officials (Former)
- Judi Dutcher, State Auditor (MN) (1995-2003)
State Legislators
- Daryl Beall, State Sen. (IA) (2003–2015)
- Roger Bruce, State Rep. (GA) (2003–2025)
- Gloria Butler, State Sen. (GA) (1990–2025)
- Polly Bukta, State Rep. (IA) (1997–Present)
- Scott Dibble, State Sen. (MN) (2003–present)
- Sheila Kuehl, State Sen. (CA) (2000–2008)
- John Longville, State Assm. (CA) (1998–2004)
- Becky Lourey, State Sen. (MN) (1997–2007)
- Pedro Marin, State Rep. (GA) (2003–2025)
- Billy Mitchell, State Rep. (GA) (2003–Present)
- Howard Mosby, State Rep. (GA) (2003–2019)
- Mee Moua, State Sen. (MN) (2002–2011)
- Nan Orrock, State Sen. (GA) (2007–Present)
- Walter R. Sailor Jr., State Rep. (GA) (2001–2008)
- Valencia Seay, State Sen. (GA) (2001–2025)
- Calvin Smyre, State Rep. (GA) (1975–2023)
- Pam Stephenson, State Rep. (GA) (2003–2020)
Mayors
- Martin Chávez, Albuquerque, New Mexico (1993-1997, 2001-2009)
- Raymond T. Rybak, Minneapolis, Minnesota (2002-2014)
Mayors (Former)
- Kenneth Reeves, Cambridge, Massachusetts (1992-1995)
Local Officials
- Tom Ammiano, M. of the San Francisco B.S. (1995-2008)
- Gifford Miller, C. Speaker for New York City (1996-2005)
- Ted Mondale, CC of the Metro Council (MN) (1999-2003)
- Vernon Jones, CEO for DeKalb County (GA) (2001-2009)
Party Officials
- Paul Berendt, State Party Chair (WA) (1995-2006)
Activists and Public Figures
- Dolores Huerta, Labor and Feminist Activist
- James M. Wall, Methodist Minister and Journalist
Business Executives and Leaders
- Reed Hastings, CEO of Netflix, Inc. (1999-2023)
Entertainment and Sports Personalities
- Calpernia Addams, Actress, Musician and Transgender Rights Activist
- David Crosby, Singer-Songwriter and Musician
- Michael Douglas, Actor
- Jade Estrada, Entertainer, Journalist and Human Rights Activist
- Melissa Etheridge, Singer, Songwriter and Musician
- Scarlett Johansson, Actress
- Graham Nash, Singer-Songwriter and Musician
- Paul Newman, Actor
- Anthony Rapp, Actor and Singer
- Rob Reiner, Actor and Filmmaker
- Martin Sheen, Actor
Organizations
- AFSCME
- CBC
- SEIU
- CTA
- IUPAT

=== Wesley Clark (to February 11, 2004) ===
U.S. Cabinet Officials (Former)
- John H. Dalton, U.S. Secretary of the Navy (1993-1998)
- Rodney E. Slater, U.S. Secretary of Transportation (1997-2001)
Non-Cabinet Executive Branch Officials (Former)
- Morton I. Abramowitz, U.S. Ambassador (Turkey) (1989-1991)
- J. Brady Anderson, Administrator for USAID (1999-2001)
- Christopher C. Ashby, U.S. Ambassador (Uruguay) (1997-2001)
- Jeffrey A. Bader, U.S. Ambassador (Namibia) (1999-2001)
- Donald M. Blinken, U.S. Ambassador (Hungary) (1994-1997)
- Amy L. Bondurant, U.S. Ambassador (OECD) (1997-2001)
- Avis T. Bohlen, U.S. Ambassador (Bulgaria) (1996-1999)
- George C. Bruno, U.S. Ambassador (Belize) (1994-1997)
- Paul L. Cejas, U.S. Ambassador (Belgium) (1998-2001)
- Timothy A. Chorba, U.S. Ambassador (Singapore) (1994-1998)
- Nancy H. Ely-Raphel, U.S. Ambassador (Slovenia) (1998-2001)
- Ralph Earle, Director of the ACDA (1980-1981)
- Mary M. French, U.S. Chief of Protocol (1997-2001)
- Edward M. Gabriel, U.S. Ambassador (Morocco) (1997-2001)
- Richard N. Gardner, U.S. Ambassador (Spain) (1993-1997)
- Robert S. Gelbard, U.S. Ambassador (Indonesia) (1999-2001)
- Gordon D. Giffin, U.S. Ambassador (Canada) (1997-2001)
- Lincoln Gordon, Asst. Sec. of State for I-AA (1966-1967)
- Anthony S. Harrington, U.S. Ambassador (Brazil) (2000-2001)
- John D. Holum, U. Sec. of State for ACIS (1997-2000)
- William J. Hughes, U.S. Ambassador (Panama) (1995-1998)
- Swanee Hunt, U.S. Ambassador (Austria) (1993-1997)
- Doug Jones, U.S. Attorney (N.D. AL) (1997-2001)
- James A. Joseph, U.S. Ambassador (South Africa) (1995-1999)
- Rodney G. Minott, U.S. Ambassador (Sweden) (1977-1980)
- John W. McDonald, U.S. Diplomat (1970's-1980's)
- Stanley L. McLelland, U.S. Ambassador (Jamaica) (1997-2001)
- Gerald S. McGowan, U.S. Ambassador (Portugal) (1998-2001)
- Lyndon L. Olson Jr., U.S. Ambassador (Sweden) (1998-2001)
- Donald K. Petterson, U.S. Ambassador (Sudan) (1992-1995)
- Kathryn L.H. Proffitt, U.S. Ambassador (Malta) (1998-2001)
- Edward L. Romero, U.S. Ambassador (Spain) (1998-2001)
- James Rosapepe, U.S. Ambassador (Romania) (1998-2001)
- James Rubin, Asst. Sec. of State for G.P.A. (1997-2000)
- David Sandalow, U.S. Ambassador (Romania) (1998-2001)
- Howard Bruner Schaffer, U.S. Ambassador (Romania) (1998-2001)
- Teresita Currie Schaffer, U.S. Ambassador (Romania) (1998-2001)
- David Scheffer, Asst. Sec. of State for OIESA (1999-2001)
- Cynthia P. Schneider, U.S. Ambassador (Netherlands) (1998-2001)
- Richard Schifter, Asst. Sec. of State for DHRL (1985-1992)
- Derek Shearer, U.S. Ambassador (Finland) (1994-1997)
- Thomas L. Siebert, U.S. Ambassador (Sweden) (1994-1997)
- Peter Tarnoff, U. Sec. of State for PA (1993-1997)
- Peter F. Tufo, U.S. Ambassador (Hungary) (1997-2001)
- Arturo Valenzuela, Dep. Asst. Sec. for I-AA (1993-1997)
- William G. Walker, U.S. Ambassador (El Salvador) (1988-1992)
- A. Vernon Weaver, U.S. Ambassador (EU) (1996-1999)
U.S. Senate
- Max Baucus, Montana CL-2 (1978-2014)
- Blanche Lincoln, Arkansas CL-3 (1999-2001)
- Mark Pryor, Arkansas CL-2 (2003-2015)
U.S. Senate (Former)
- Dale Bumpers, Arkansas CL-3 (1975-1999)
- George McGovern, South Dakota CL-3 (1963-1981)
- Gaylord Nelson, Wisconsin CL-3 (1963-1981)
- David Pryor, Arkansas CL-2 (1979-1997)
U.S. House of Representatives
- Marion Berry, Arkansas 1st (1997-2011)
- Sanford Bishop, Georgia 2nd (1993-Present)
- Artur Davis, Alabama 7th (2003-2011)
- Lincoln Davis, Tennessee 4th (2003-2011)
- Rahm Emanuel, Illinois 5th (2003-2009)
- Martin Frost, Texas 24th (1979-2005)
- Charlie Gonzalez, Texas 20th (1999-2013)
- Steve Israel, New York (2001-2017)
- William Jefferson, Louisiana 2nd (1991-2009)
- Dale Kildee, Michigan (1977-2013)
- Jim Matheson, Utah (2001-2015)
- Betty McCollum, Minnesota 4th (2001-Present)
- Solomon Ortiz, Texas 27th (1983-2011)
- Charles Rangel, New York (1971-2017)
- Mike Ross, Arkansas 4th (2001-2013)
- Vic Snyder, Arkansas 2nd (1997-2011)
- Charles Stenholm, Texas 17th (1979-2005)
- Gene Taylor, Mississippi (1989-2011)
- Mike Thompson, California (1999-Present)
- Anthony Weiner, New York 9th (1999-2011)
Governors (Former)
- Jim Hodges, South Carolina (1999-2003)
- Don Siegelman, Alabama (1999-2003)
State Officials
- Ben Chandler, Attorney General (KY) (1996-2004)
- Barbara Lawton, Lt. Governor (WI) (2003-2011)
State Officials (Former)
- Bob Butterworth, Attorney General (FL) (1987-2002)
State Legislators
- Kenneth Gottlieb, State Rep. (FL) (1998-2006)
Mayors (Former)
- Paul Johnson, Phoenix, Arizona (1990-1994)
- Andrew Young, Atlanta, Georgia (1982-1990)
Local Officials
- Jim Roth, County Cmmr. (OK) (2003-2007)
Party Officials
- Molly Beth Malcolm, State Party Chair (TX) (1998-2003)
Activists and Public Figures
- Michael Moore, Film Director and Author
Entertainment and Sports Personalities
- John Cusack, Actor
- Ted Danson, Actor
- George Jones, Singer, Songwriter and Musician
- Madonna, Singer, Songwriter, and Actress
- Mike Myers, Actor, Comedian and Filmmaker
- Mary Steenburgen, Actress, Comedian and Singer
Organizations
- Missisquoi Abenaki Tribe
Newspapers and Publications
- The Norman Transcript
- Lawton Constitution

=== Joe Lieberman (to February 3, 2004) ===
U.S. Senate
- Tom Carper, Delaware CL-1 (1949-1973)
- Dennis DeConcini, Arizona CL-1 (1949-1973)
- Chris Dodd, Connecticut CL-3 (1981-2011)
U.S. House of Representatives
- Dennis Cardoza, California 18th (2003-2012)
- Brad Carson, Oklahoma 2nd (2001-2005)
- Ed Case, Hawaii 2nd (2002-2007)
- Rosa DeLauro, Connecticut 3rd (1991-Present)
- Cal Dooley, California (1991-2005)
- Eliot Engel, New York (1989-2021)
- Alcee Hastings, Florida (1993-2021)
- John B. Larson, Connecticut 1st (1999-Present)
- Bill Lipinski, Illinois (1983-2005)
- Ellen Tauscher, California's 10th (1997-2009)
- Robert Wexler, Florida 19th (1997-2010)
U.S. House of Representatives
- Mel Levine, California 27th (1983-1993)
Governors (Former)
- Raúl Castro, Arizona (1975-1977)
Statewide Officials
- Robert Butkin, State Treasurer (OK) (1995-2005)
- Cruz Bustamante, Lt. Governor (CA) (1999-2007)
- John Carney, Lt. Governor (DE) (2001-2009)
- Drew Edmondson, Attorney General (OK) (1995-2011)
- Alan Hevesi, State Comptroller (NY) (2003-2006)
- Tim Kaine, Lt. Governor (VA) (2002-2006)
- Jack Markell, State Treasurer (DE) (1999-2009)
- Jeff McMahan, State Auditor and Inspector (OK) (2003-2008)
- Tom Miller, Attorney General (IA) (1979-1991, 1995-2023)
State Legislators
- Steve Gallardo, State Rep. (AZ) (2003-2009)
- Jack Jackson Jr., State Rep. (AZ) (2003-2005)
- ~~Richard Miranda, State Sen. (AZ) (2003-2011)~~
- Tom DiNapoli, State Assm. (NY) (1987-2007)
- Jeffrey Schoenberg, State Sen. (IL) (2003-2013)
- Sheldon Silver, State Ass. Speaker (NY) (1977-2015)
- ~~Wally Straughn, State Rep. (AZ) (2003-2005)~~
- Stratton Taylor, State Sen. (OK) (1982-2006)
Local Officials
- Tom Suozzi, CE of Nassau County (NY) (2002-2009)
Newspapers and Publications
- The Arizona Republic
- The Greenville News
- New Hampshire Union Leader
- The New Republic
- The State

=== Dick Gephardt (to January 20, 2004) ===
U.S. House of Representatives
- Rob Andrews, New Jersey 1st (1990-2014)
- Chris Bell, Texas 25th (2003-2005)
- Howard Berman, California (1983-2013)
- Sherrod Brown, Ohio 13th (1993-2007)
- Lois Capps, California (1998-2017)
- Ben Cardin, Maryland 3rd (1987-2007)
- Lacy Clay, Missouri's 1st (2001-2021)
- Jim Clyburn, South Carolina 6th (1993-Present)
- Jerry Costello, Illinois (1988-2013)
- Chet Edwards, Texas (1991-2011)
- Lane Evans, Illinois 17th (1983-2017)
- Bart Gordon, Tennessee 6th (1985-2011)
- Gene Green, Texas 29th (1993-2019)
- Joe Hoeffel, Pennsylvania 13th (1999-2005)
- Tim Holden, Pennsylvania (1993-2013)
- Steny Hoyer, Whip, Maryland 5th (1981-Present)
- Patrick J. Kennedy, Rhode Island 1st (1995-2011)
- James Langevin, Rhode Island 2nd (2001-2023)
- Nita Lowey, New York (1989-2021)
- Bob Matsui, California (1979-2005)
- Karen McCarthy, Missouri 5th (1995-2005)
- John Murtha, Pennsylvania 12th (1974-2010)
- Dave Obey, Wisconsin 7th (1969-2011)
- Ed Pastor, Arizona (1991-2015)
- Nancy Pelosi, Leader, California (1987-Present)
- Silvestre Reyes, Texas 16th (1997-2013)
- Dutch Ruppersberger, Maryland 2nd (2003-2025)
- Max Sandlin, Texas 1st (1997-2005)
- Adam Schiff, California (2001-2024)
- Ike Skelton, Missouri 4th (1977-2011)
- John Spratt, South Carolina 5th (1983-2011)
- John Tanner, Tennessee 8th (1989-2011)
Governors
- Bob Holden, Missouri (2001-2005)
Statewide Officials (Former)
- Robert S. Kerr III, Lt. Governor (OK) (1987-1991)
Activists and Public Figures
- James P. Hoffa, General President of the IBT (1998-2022)
Business Executives and Leaders
- Eric Schmidt, CEO of Google (2001-2011)
- Walter Shorenstein, CEO of Shorenstein Properties (1960-1995)
Entertainers and Sport Personalities
- David Foster, Record Producer, Composer and Musician
- Aaron Sorkin, Screenwriter, Playwright and Filmmaker
Organizations
- AMO
- IAM
- IBT
- LIUNA
- MEBA
- SIU
- TWU
- UAW (IA)
- UFCW
- USW

=== Carol Moseley Braun (to January 15, 2004) ===
U.S. Cabinet Officials (Former)
- William T. Coleman Jr., U.S. Sec. of Transportation (1975–1977)
Non-Cabinet Executive Officials (Former)
- John M. Deutch, Director of the CIA (1995–1996)
U.S. Senate (Former)
- Paul Simon, Illinois CL-2 (1949-1973)
U.S. House of Representatives
- Danny Davis, Illinois 7th (1997-Present)
- Bobby Rush, Illinois 1st (1993-2023)
U.S. House of Representatives (Former)
- Cleo Fields, Louisiana (1993-1997, 2025-Present)
- Harold Ford Sr., Tennessee (1975-1997)
State Officials
- C. Delores Tucker, Secretary of the Commonwealth (PA) (1971-1977)
State Legislators
- Emil Jones, State Sen. President (IL) (1983-2009)
Local Officials
- John Stroger, President of the CCBC (1994-2006)
Party Officials (Former)
- Donald Fowler, DNC Party Chair (1995-1997)
Organizations
- NOW
- NWPC
Activists and Public Figures
- Marian Wright Edelman, Civil Rights and Children's Rights Activist
- Kim Gandy, President of NOW (2001-2009)
- Dorothy Height, Civil Rights and Women's Rights Activist
- Celinda Lake, Pollster and Political Strategist
- Roselyn O'Connell, President of the NWPC (1999-2004)
- Gloria Steinem, Journalist and Social-Political Activist
- Coretta Scott King, Author and Civil Rights Activist
- Marie C. Wilson, Founder of The White House Project
Business Executives and Leaders
- W. Don Cornwell, CEO of Granite Broadcasting (1988-2009)
- Berry Gordy, Founder of Motown
- Mellody Hobson, President of Ariel Investments (2000-Present)
- Valerie Jarrett, CEO of 'The Habitat Company' (1995-2009)
- Robert L. Johnson, CEO of BET (1979-2006)
Entertainment and Sports Personalities
- Willie Davis, NFL DE (1958-1969)
- Quincy Jones, Record Producer and Composer
- Don King, Boxing Promoter

== Lyndon LaRouche ==
State Legislators
- Erik R. Fleming, State Rep. (MS) (1999-2008)
- Harold James, State Rep. (PA) (1989-2008, 2012-2013)
- Joe Towns, State Rep. (TN) (1995-Present)
- Perry B. Clark, State Rep. (KY) (1995-2006)
- Billy McKinney, State Rep. (GA) (1993-2003)
- Joe Neal, State Sen. (NV) (1973-2004)
