= Heimbold =

Heimbold is a surname. Notable people with the surname include:

- Charles A. Heimbold Jr. (1933–2024), American businessman and diplomat
- Pete Francis Heimbold (born 1975), American musician
