= Benjamin F. Angel =

American lawyer, politician and diplomat (1815-1894)

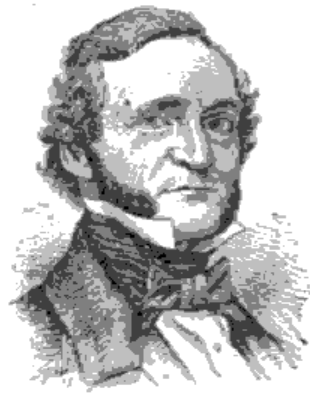
- Born: Benjamin Franklin Angel; November 28, 1815; Burlington, New York
- Died: September 11, 1894 (aged 78); Geneseo, New York
- Occupations: Lawyer, politician, diplomat
- Political party: Democratic

Benjamin Franklin Angel (November 28, 1815 – September 11, 1894) was an American lawyer, politician and diplomat.

== Life ==
Benjamin Franklin Angel was born in Burlington, New York, the son of Benjamin Angel and Abigail (Stickney) Angel. He studied law, was admitted to the bar, and commenced practice in Geneseo. He was Surrogate of Livingston County from 1836 to 1840 and from 1844 to 1847. He married Julia Jones. He was a delegate to the 1852 Democratic National Convention at Baltimore.

In 1853, his health having become impaired, he accepted an appointment as United States Consul at Honolulu, then in the Kingdom of Hawaii. In 1855, he was sent by President Franklin Pierce to China as Special Commissioner to settle a dispute between some American merchants and the Chinese government regarding the exaction of export duties. This mission was successful, and he returned to the United States by way of the East Indies, Egypt, and Europe. On his return, he was nominated for Congress without his consent, but was defeated.

In 1857, Angel was appointed by President James Buchanan as Minister to Sweden and Norway, and remained in Stockholm until 1861. He was a delegate to the 1864 Democratic National Convention at Chicago. He was President of the New York State Agricultural Society from 1873 to 1874.

He died in Geneseo, New York in 1894.

== Sources ==
- "Angel, Benjamin Franklin". The Biographical Dictionary of America. Vol. 1. 1906. p. 123.
- The New York Civil List compiled by Franklin Benjamin Hough (page 414; Weed, Parsons and Co., 1858)
- "The Obituary Record; Benjamin F. Angel" in NYT on September 13, 1894

Diplomatic posts
Preceded by Francis Schroeder	U.S. Minister to Sweden and Norway; 1857–1861	Succeeded by Jacob S. Haldeman
