= Joe Gibson =

Joe Gibson may refer to:

- Joe Gibson (American football) (1919–2002), American football player
- Joe Gibson (footballer) (born 2001), English footballer
- Joe Gibson (politician) (1938–2024), American politician from Texas

== See also ==
- Joseph Gibson (c. 1823–1886), Americo-Liberian politician
- Joseph Deighton Gibson Jr. (1920–2000), American radio disc jockey and actor
- Joey Gibson (political activist) (born 1983), American right-wing activist
