= Christopher Van Hollen =

Christopher Van Hollen could refer to:

- Christopher Van Hollen (diplomat) (1922-2013), American diplomat
- Chris Van Hollen (born 1959), United States senator from Maryland and son of Christopher Van Hollen
