= Robert Strausz-Hupé =

American diplomat (1903–2002)

United States Ambassador to Turkey
- In office July 27, 1981 – May 18, 1989
- President: Ronald Reagan; George H. W. Bush
- Preceded by: James W. Spain
- Succeeded by: Morton I. Abramowitz

11th United States Ambassador to NATO
- In office March 3, 1976 – April 20, 1977
- President: Gerald Ford; Jimmy Carter
- Preceded by: David K. E. Bruce
- Succeeded by: William Tapley Bennett Jr.

United States Ambassador to Sweden
- In office April 25, 1974 – March 3, 1976
- President: Gerald Ford
- Preceded by: Arthur J. Olsen
- Succeeded by: David S. Smith

United States Ambassador to Belgium
- In office February 15, 1972 – May 22, 1974
- President: Richard Nixon
- Preceded by: John S. D. Eisenhower
- Succeeded by: Leonard Firestone

United States Ambassador to Sri Lanka and Maldives
- In office May 3, 1970 – December 12, 1971
- President: Richard Nixon
- Preceded by: Andrew V. Corry
- Succeeded by: Christopher Van Hollen

Personal details
- Born: March 25, 1903 Vienna, Austria
- Died: February 24, 2002 (aged 98) Newtown Square, Pennsylvania, U.S.
- Party: Republican
- Spouses: Eleanor Cuyler (m. 1939; died 1976) Mayrose Ferreira Nugara (m. 1979)
- Profession: Diplomat; geopolitical theorist

Robert Strausz-Hupé (March 25, 1903 – February 24, 2002) was an Austrian-born American diplomat and geopolitical theorist.

== Life and career ==
Born in 1903 in Austria, Strausz-Hupé immigrated to the United States in 1923. Serving as an advisor on foreign investment to American financial institutions, he watched the Depression spread political misery across America and Europe. After the Anschluss of Austria in 1938, Strausz-Hupé began writing and lecturing to American audiences on "the coming war." After one such lecture in Philadelphia, he was invited to give a talk at the University of Pennsylvania, an event which led to his taking a position on the faculty there in 1940. He became an associate professor in 1946.

Strausz-Hupé founded the Foreign Policy Research Institute at the University of Pennsylvania in 1955, which later became independent in 1970. In 1957, the Institute published the first issue of Orbis, the quarterly journal that remains to this day the institute's flagship publication. Strausz-Hupé authored or co-authored several important books on international affairs.

Strausz-Hupé was a member of the Citizens Committee for a Free Cuba, founded in 1963.

Strausz-Hupé was a foreign policy advisor to Barry Goldwater when Goldwater was the Republican Party's candidate for President of the United States in 1964, and also advised Richard Nixon in his successful 1968 campaign. As president, Nixon appointed Strausz-Hupé to be Ambassador to Morocco in 1969, but the appointment was blocked by Arkansas Senator J. William Fulbright, head of the Foreign Relations Committee, on the grounds that Strausz-Hupé was too strongly against communism. Despite this, the following year he was appointed U.S. Ambassador to Sri Lanka and the Maldive Islands, and subsequently served as ambassador to Belgium (1972–1974), Sweden (1974–1976), NATO (1976–77), and Turkey (1981–1989).

In 1989, upon retirement after eight years as Ambassador to Turkey, Strausz-Hupé rejoined the Foreign Policy Research Institute as Distinguished Diplomat-in-Residence and president emeritus.

== Personal life and death ==
On April 26, 1938, in New York City, he married Eleanor DeGraff Cuyler Walker (1898–1976), daughter of railroad director Thomas DeWitt Cuyler (1854–1922) and his wife, Frances Lewis Cuyler (1860–1941). She was a descendant of the Hasbrouck family and a second cousin, once removed of New York Governor DeWitt Clinton. She was the youngest of four daughters, and was divorced from Joseph Walker with three children of her own: Eleanor Cuyler Walker Seyffert (1917–1992), Joseph Walker IV (1920–2007) and Peter Cuyler Walker (1925–2000). They did not have any children together, and Eleanor died on March 8, 1976, while in Sweden.

Strausz-Hupé married secondly Mayrose (nee Ferreira) Nugara (b. 1936) on August 22, 1979. She had three children of her own: Ingrid, Cynthia and Ricky. He died at home in Newtown Square, Pennsylvania, on February 24, 2002, at the age of 98.

== Quotations ==
- "As policy evolves towards several continental systems, and technology accentuates the strategic importance of large, contiguous areas. Thus the era of overseas empires and free world trade closes. If this reasoning is pushed to its absolute conclusion, the national state is also a thing of the past, and the future belongs to the giant state. Many nations will be locked in a few vast compartments. But in each of these one people, controlling a strategic area, will be master of the others." – Geopolitics: The Struggle for Space and Power (1942)

== Works ==
- Axis America: Hitler Plans Our Future (1941)
- Geopolitics: The Struggle for Space and Power (1942)
- The Balance of Tomorrow: Power and Foreign Policy in the United States (1945)
- International Relations (1950)
- The Zone of Indifference (1952)
- The Estrangement of Western Man (1953)
- A Forward Strategy for America (1955)
- Power and Community (1956)
- (co-editor) The Idea of Colonialism (1958)
- (with others) Protracted Conflict: A Forward Strategy for America (1959)
- (with others) Building the Atlantic World (1963)
- In My Time: An Eclectic Autobiography (1965)
- Strategy and Values: Selected Writings of Robert Strausz-Hupé (1973)
- Democracy and American Foreign Policy: Reflections on the Legacy of Alexis de Tocqueville (1995)

Diplomatic posts
Preceded by Andrew V. Corry	U.S. Ambassador to Sri Lanka; 1970–1971; Also accredited to Maldives	Succeeded by Christopher Van Hollen
Preceded by John S. D. Eisenhower	U.S. Ambassador to Belgium; 1972–1974	Succeeded by Leonard Firestone
Preceded by Jerome Holland	U.S. Ambassador to Sweden; 1974–1976	Succeeded by David S. Smith
Preceded by David K. E. Bruce	U.S. Ambassador to NATO; 1976–1977	Succeeded by W. Tapley Bennett, Jr.
Preceded by James W. Spain	U.S. Ambassador to Turkey; 1981–1989	Succeeded by Morton I. Abramowitz
