= Erik Ramanathan =

American diplomat

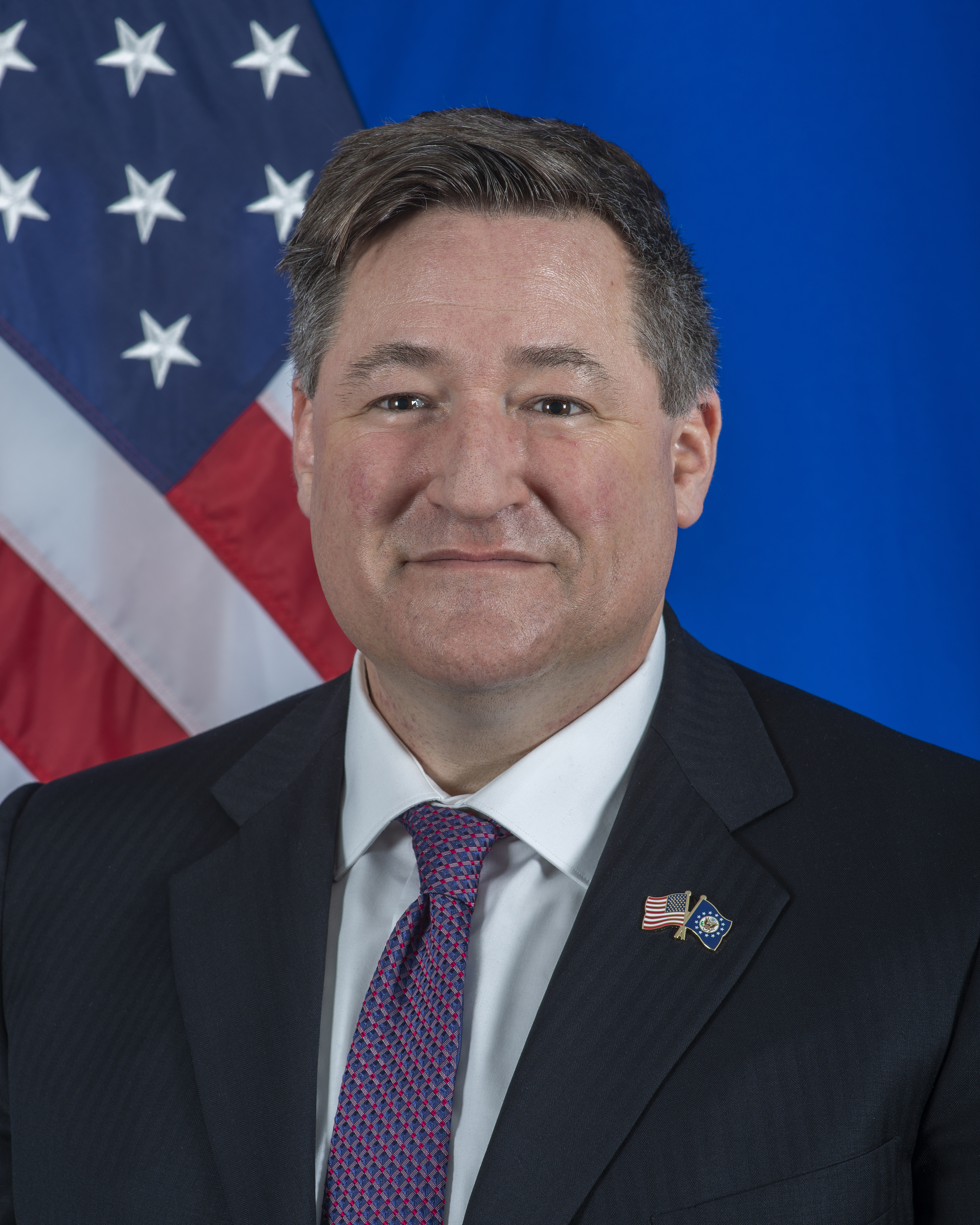
- Official portrait, 2022

United States Ambassador to Sweden
- In office January 20, 2022 – January 20, 2025
- President: Joe Biden
- Preceded by: Ken Howery
- Succeeded by: Christine Toretti

Personal details
- Born: Erik Douglas Newton
- Party: Democratic
- Spouse: Ranesh Ramanathan
- Children: 1
- Education: Johns Hopkins University (BA); Harvard University (JD)

Erik Douglas Ramanathan (né Newton) is an American attorney and diplomat who served as United States ambassador to Sweden under President Joe Biden from 2022 to 2025.

== Education ==
Ramanathan earned a Bachelor of Arts in behavioral sciences and biology from Johns Hopkins University in 1991 and a Juris Doctor from Harvard Law School in 1996. He moved from studying medicine to law because he believed he was better suited for a career in activism and policy, and wanted to take a more active role in politics. He was leader of the LGBT student organization at Johns Hopkins.

== Career ==
From 1996 to 2000, Ramanathan worked as an attorney at Proskauer Rose in New York City focused on medical centers and the healthcare industry. From 2000 to 2006, he was the senior vice president, general counsel and CCO of ImClone Systems, a Nasdaq-100 biotechnology firm researching and developing cancer treatments, which was later acquired by Eli Lilly and Company.

From 2001 to 2010, he was chairman of the board of directors of Immigration Equality, an organization that represents LGBTQ and HIV-positive people in the immigration system. He was also a trustee of the Barack Obama 2012 presidential campaign. From 2009 to 2012, Ramanathan was the executive director of the Harvard Law School Center on the Legal Profession where he studied the evolution of the global legal profession. Ramanathan was senior fellow from 2013 to 2015. He was co-chair of the finance cabinet for Congressman Seth Moulton's 2016 and 2018 re-election campaigns. He was also a member of the Joe Biden 2020 presidential campaign's national finance committee. Ramanthan went on to become the board chair of Heluna Health, a national health non-profit.

=== Ambassador to Sweden ===
On September 22, 2021, President Joe Biden announced his intent to nominate Ramanathan to be the next United States ambassador to Sweden. On October 4, 2021, his nomination was sent to the Senate. Hearings on his nomination were held before the Senate Foreign Relations Committee on November 2, 2021. On December 15, 2021, his nomination was reported out of committee. On December 18, 2021, his nomination was confirmed in the Senate by voice vote. He presented his credentials to king Carl XVI Gustaf on January 20, 2022.

His tenure as ambassador was focused on the Russo-Ukrainian War, Sweden's application for membership in NATO, and green economic transition. Following Russia's invasion of Ukraine, Ramanathan was involved in U.S. efforts to support Sweden's membership in NATO. While ambassador, Ramanathan signed international agreements with Sweden regarding combatting foreign malign disinformation, quantum information science and technology collaboration, space exploration, and advanced energy research and development.

== Personal ==
He is married to Ranesh Ramanathan, who leads the capital solutions practice at Akin Gump Strauss Hauer & Feld. They met when they were both studying organic chemistry at university. He has adopted his partner's last name. The Boston-based couple has a daughter, Violet, born in 2005 from surrogacy, who as of 2022 attends a high school in Stockholm.

== See also ==
- Ambassadors of the United States

Diplomatic posts
| Preceded by Ken Howery | United States Ambassador to Sweden; 2022–2025 | Succeeded by Christine Toretti |
