= William Walton Butterworth =

American diplomat

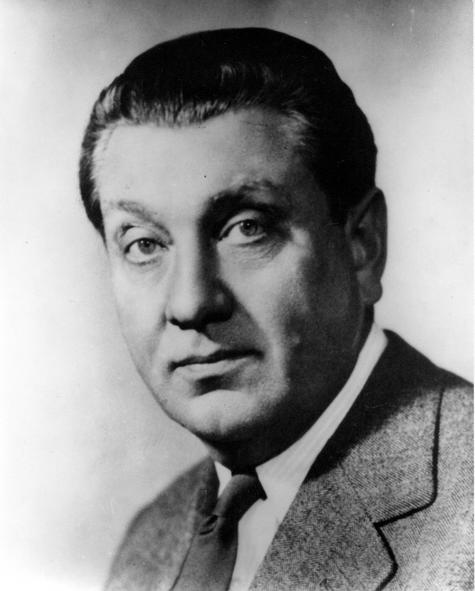

8th United States Ambassador to Canada
- In office October 4, 1962 – September 10, 1968
- President: John F. Kennedy; Lyndon B. Johnson
- Preceded by: Livingston T. Merchant
- Succeeded by: Harold F. Linder

1st United States Ambassador to the European Communities
- In office August 10, 1961 – October 25, 1962
- President: John F. Kennedy
- Preceded by: New office
- Succeeded by: John W. Tuthill

United States Ambassador to Sweden
- In office July 5, 1950 – December 9, 1953
- President: Harry S. Truman; Dwight D. Eisenhower
- Preceded by: H. Freeman Matthews
- Succeeded by: John M. Cabot

1st Assistant Secretary of State for Japanese Affairs
- In office March 28, 1950 – July 4, 1950
- President: Harry S. Truman
- Preceded by: Position established
- Succeeded by: Position abolished

1st Assistant Secretary of State for Far Eastern Affairs
- In office September 29, 1949 – March 28, 1950
- President: Harry S. Truman
- Preceded by: Position established
- Succeeded by: Dean Rusk

Personal details
- Born: September 7, 1903 New Orleans, Louisiana, U.S.
- Died: March 31, 1975 (aged 71) New York City, U.S.
- Resting place: New Orleans, Louisiana, U.S.

William Walton Butterworth (September 7, 1903 – March 31, 1975) was an American diplomat. He was United States Ambassador to Canada. Butterworth is best known for his work on Asian-American foreign relations, particularly during the clash of the communists and nationalists in post-war China. He was also instrumental in laying the groundwork for the European Union via his work with the European Coal and Steel Community and European Economic Community.

== Education ==
Butterworth was born in New Orleans, Orleans Parish, Louisiana, on September 7, 1903. In Mercer County, New Jersey, he attended The Lawrenceville School where he graduated in 1921. He later attended New Jersey's Princeton University, graduating in 1925. He was also a Rhodes Scholar at Oxford University in England.

== Foreign Service ==
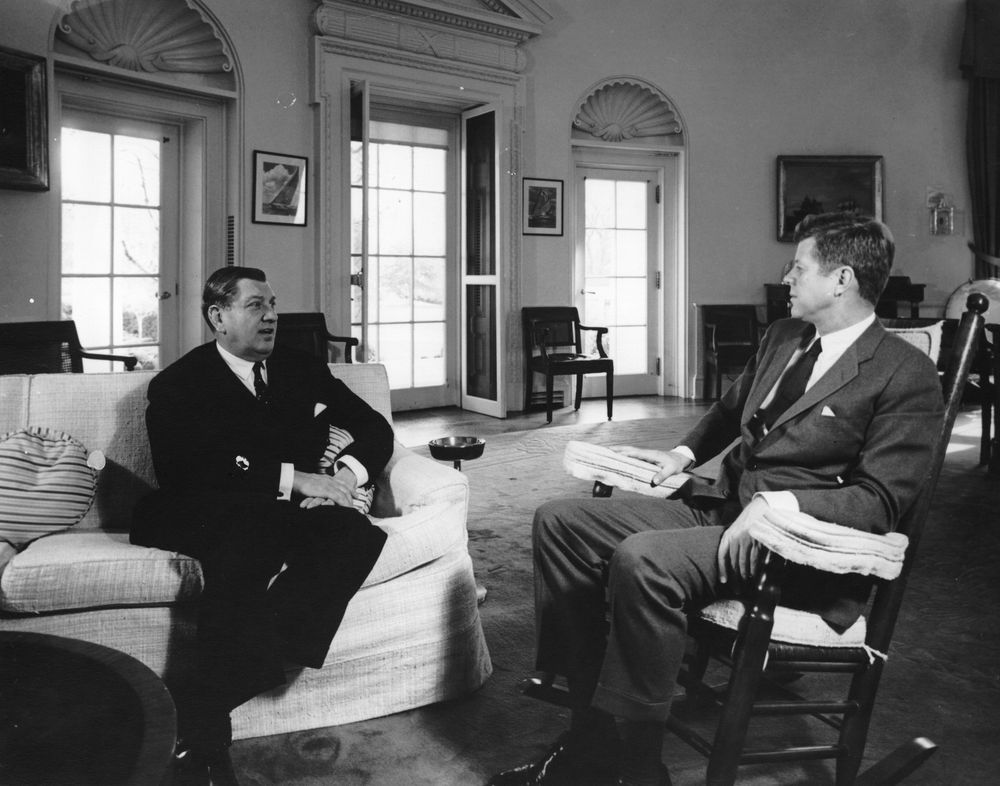
Butterworth, Ambassador to Canada, meets with President Kennedy in the Oval Office on November 16, 1962.

He entered the Foreign Service in 1928 and began a career that encompassed 40 years of service.

His career began with a one-year stint at the State Department building in Washington. From 1929 to 1931, he was the vice consul to the Embassy in Singapore. Following brief posts in Washington and Ottawa, he was assigned to the American Embassy in London, where he served as second secretary until 1941. During World War II, Butterworth was first secretary of the American Embassy in Madrid from 1942 to 1944. Concurrently, he was in charge of operations for the United States Commercial Co. for the Iberian Peninsula, a government entity that played war games by procuring strategic war materials, including tungsten. From 1944 to 1946 he was the U.S. Embassy counselor in Madrid. From 1946 to 1947, Mr. Butterworth served as the counselor of the U.S. Embassy in Nanking, China, where he held the rank of minister and was a political advisor to George Marshall. Following his assignment in China, Butterworth returned as director for Far Eastern Affairs. He was appointed by General Marshall to be the Assistant Secretary for Far Eastern Affairs in 1950. Butterworth later served as U.S. ambassador to Sweden, U.S. representative to the European Coal and Steel Community, U.S. representative to the European Economic Community and European Atomic Energy Community. He was named a Career Ambassador on March 20, 1962, one of forty-six diplomats to hold the title.

In what would be his last posting, Butterworth was appointed by President John F. Kennedy to be the 8th U.S. Ambassador to Canada on October 4, 1962; on September 10, 1968, he would leave this posting.

== Pan American airplane crash ==
On February 22, 1943, Butterworth and the other passengers and crew on Pan American's Yankee Clipper crashed into the Tagus River in Lisbon, Portugal. On September 13, 1968, Butterworth was presented with the Department's Award for Heroism, he was cited:

In recognition of your courage and cool-headed resourcefulness at the crash...Although injured, you broke free of the wreckage, swam to survivors in the water and assisted them in reaching floating debris which sustained life until a rescue boat arrived

Butterworth was an expert swimmer and helped other survivors despite two cracked ribs, all while keeping his briefcase full of classified documents with him. The plane crashed when the left wing touched the water during descent. Tamara Drasin and Ben Robertson, along with 22 others, were killed in the crash.

== Retirement ==
After retirement in 1968, William Walton Butterworth died on March 31, 1975, of cirrhosis of the liver. While his last residence was in Mercer County, New Jersey, he was buried at Metairie Cemetery, City of New Orleans, Orleans Parish, Louisiana.

== Footnotes ==
Government offices
New title Pub. L. 81–73	Assistant Secretary of State for Far Eastern Affairs; September 29, 1949 – July 4, 1950	Succeeded by Dean Rusk
Diplomatic posts
Preceded by H. Freeman Matthews	United States Ambassador to Sweden; Ambassador Extraordinary and Plenipotentiary; July 5, 1950 – December 9, 1953	Succeeded by John M. Cabot
New title	United States Ambassador to the European Communities; August 10, 1961 – October 25, 1962	Succeeded by John W. Tuthill
Preceded by Livingston T. Merchant	United States Ambassador to Canada; October 4, 1962 – September 10, 1968	Succeeded by Harold F. Linder
