= Philip Young (ambassador) =

American government official and diplomat

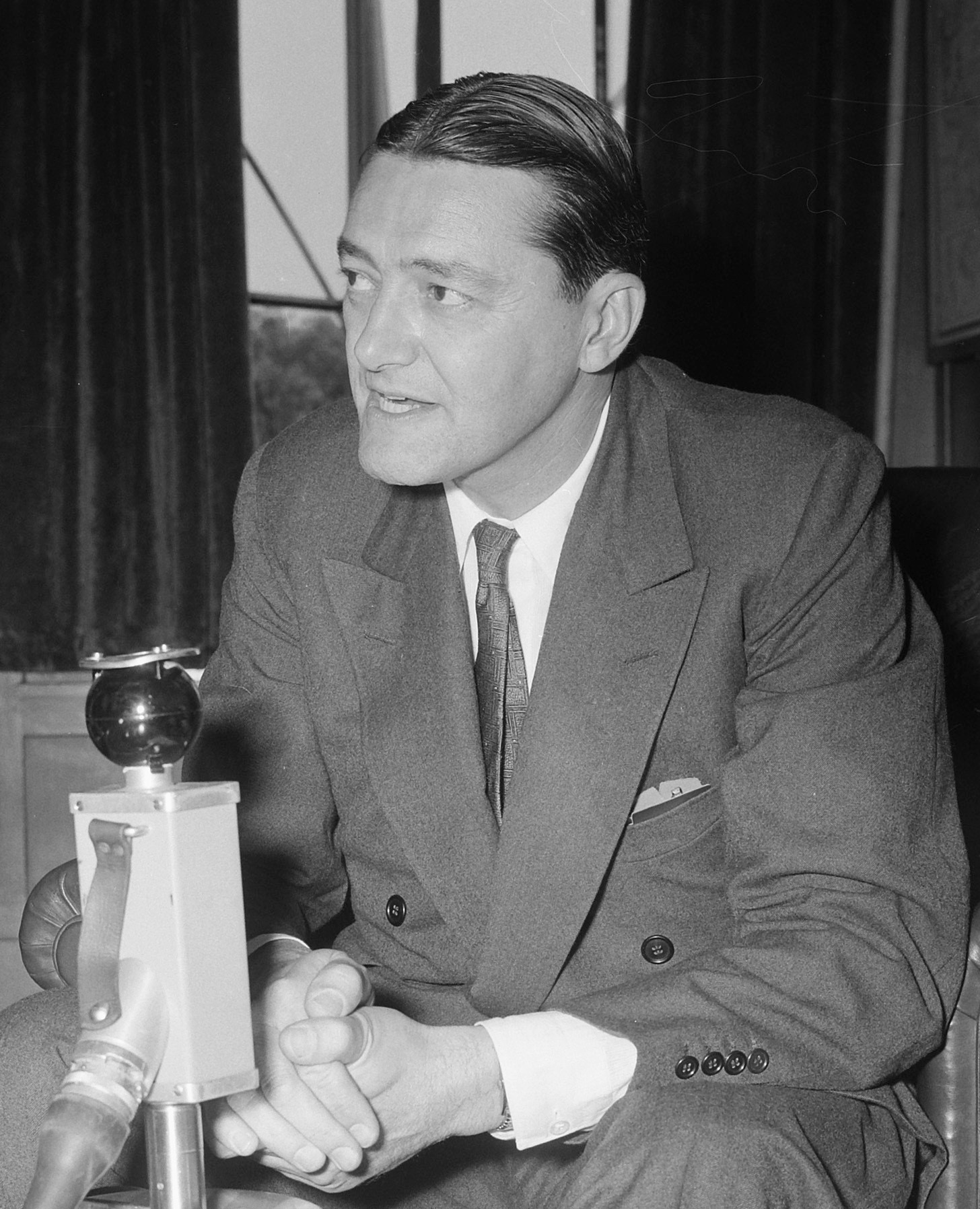
- Philip Young in the Netherlands in 1957

Chair of the United States Civil Service Commission
- In office March 23, 1953 – February 11, 1957
- Preceded by: Robert Ramspeck
- Succeeded by: Harris Ellsworth

United States Ambassador to the Netherlands
- In office 1957–1960
- Preceded by: H. Freeman Matthews
- Succeeded by: John S. Rice

Personal details
- Born: May 9, 1910 Lexington, Massachusetts, U.S.
- Died: January 15, 1987 (aged 76) Arlington, Virginia, U.S.
- Parent: Owen D. Young (father)
- Education: Harvard University

Philip Young (May 9, 1910 – January 15, 1987) was an American government official and diplomat who served as United States ambassador to the Netherlands and chair of the United States Civil Service Commission.

== Life and career ==
The son of Owen D. Young, Philip Young was born in Lexington, Massachusetts on May 9, 1910. He graduated from the Choate School, received his bachelor's degree from St. Lawrence University, and graduated with a master of business administration degree from Harvard University in 1933.

Young was initially employed as an economist at the Securities and Exchange Commission, where he worked until 1938, when he moved to the Treasury Department, where he worked on the Lend-Lease Program at the start of World War II. Young joined the United States Navy after the United States became involved in hostilities, serving as a Lieutenant Commander in the supply corps.

After the war Young entered the private sector, where he worked until becoming dean of Columbia University's Business School in 1948. While at Columbia he worked closely with Dwight D. Eisenhower during Eisenhower's term as president of the university. When Eisenhower became President of the United States in 1953, he appointed Young as his personnel manager and named him to a position on the Civil Service Commission. He served until 1957. He was the commission's chairman from March 23, 1953, until resigning on February 11, 1957. He garnered mixed attention for carrying out an executive order to purge government departments of individuals who were only suspected of being subversive.

In 1957 Young was appointed as the ambassador to the Netherlands, where he served until 1960.

Upon returning to the United States, Young was named executive director of the United States Council for the International Chamber of Commerce, where he served until 1965. He then worked for several years as a management consultant before retiring to Van Hornesville, New York and Great Falls, Virginia.

He died in Arlington, Virginia on January 15, 1987.

Diplomatic posts
Preceded by H. Freeman Matthews	United States Ambassador to the Netherlands; 1957–1960	Succeeded by John S. Rice
