= David S. Smith =

American diplomat

David Shiverick Smith (January 25, 1918 – April 13, 2012) was the United States ambassador to Sweden from 1976–1977.

== Early life ==
Smith was born in Omaha, Nebraska, the son of Anna (née Shiverick) and Floyd Monroe Smith. He graduated magna cum laude from Dartmouth College (where he was a member of Phi Beta Kappa), having also studied at the Sorbonne, the University of Mexico and Columbia University Law School. He served in the United States Navy during World War II.

== Career ==
Smith became the United States ambassador to Sweden under President Gerald Ford in 1976. He oversaw Henry Kissinger's visit to the country, the first time a United States Secretary of State had visited Sweden. His service ended in 1977.

He was appointed by President Dwight D. Eisenhower as a trustee of the National Cultural Center and was a board member of the Council of American Ambassadors.

== Personal life ==
His niece was actress Anne Ramsey. He was married to June Noble, daughter of Edward J. Noble.

Diplomatic posts
Preceded by Robert Strausz-Hupé	U.S. Ambassador to Sweden; 1976 -1977	Succeeded by Rodney O'Gliasain Kennedy-Minott
