= Christine Toretti =

American politician and businesswoman (born 1957)

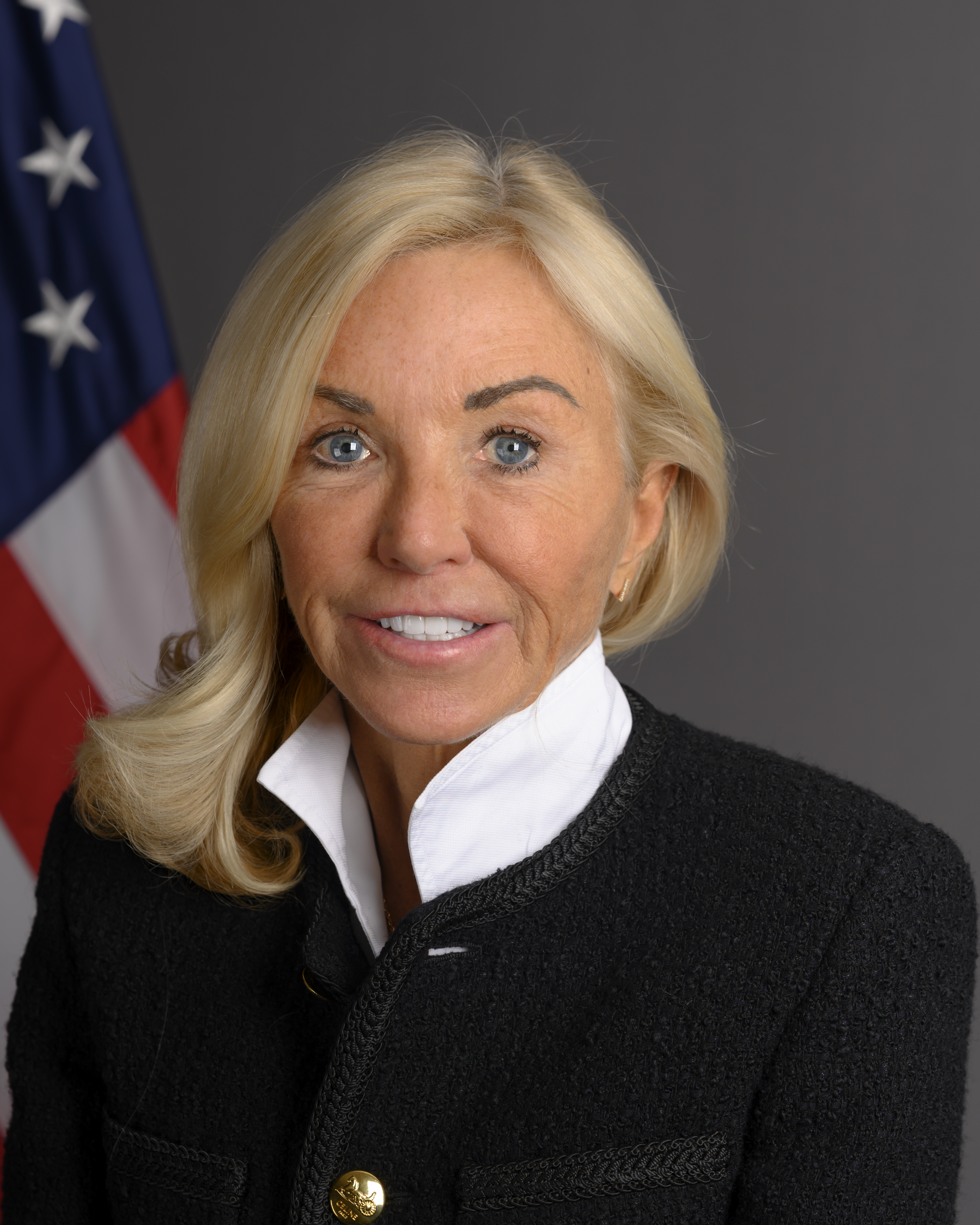
- Official portrait, 2025

United States Ambassador to Sweden
- Incumbent
- Assumed office October 21, 2025
- President: Donald Trump
- Preceded by: Erik Ramanathan

Republican National Committeewoman from Pennsylvania
- In office August 21, 1997 – October 21, 2025
- Preceded by: Anne Anstine
- Succeeded by: Lori Hardiman

Personal details
- Born: February 24, 1957 (age 69)
- Party: Republican
- Spouse: Lute Olson (m. 2003; div. 2007)
- Children: 3

Christine Jack Toretti (born February 24, 1957) is an American politician, businesswoman, philanthropist, and Pennsylvania's Republican National Committeewoman. In January 2025, then President-elect Donald Trump nominated her to become the United States ambassador to Sweden. She was confirmed by the U.S. Senate on September 18, 2025.

== Business career ==
Toretti was the chair and CEO of S.W. Jack Drilling Co., a privately held land-based drilling company in the United States.

Toretti assumed control of the company in 1990, upon the unexpected death of her father, Samuel W. Jack Jr. Prior to that, she served as CFO. She is noted as a rare female CEO in the male-dominated energy industry. The company had 92 employees and $5 million in annual revenue in 1990.

In 1995, Toretti expanded the company when she led the purchase and merger with another drilling company. She relinquished day-to-day operations in 1997. The company currently has 350 employees and $60 million in annual revenue.

From 2004 to 2010, S.W. Jack Drilling donated more than $150,000 to then Pennsylvania governor Tom Corbett.

== Political career ==
Toretti founded the Anne Anstine Excellence in Public Service Series, a training program specifically designed to educate, empower, and advance Republican women.

Former Pennsylvania governor Tom Ridge appointed Toretti to the Pennsylvania State System of Higher Education in 1995, where she helped reorganize the organization's investments in higher education. Former Pennsylvania governor Mark Schweiker appointed her to the Interstate Oil and Gas Compact Commission. President George W. Bush appointed her to the Rural Telephone Bank, the National Petroleum Council and to the advisory board for the U.S. Secretary of Energy

On August 21, 1997, Toretti was elected to serve as the Republican National Committeewomen for Pennsylvania. She served on the RNC Committee on Arrangements for the 2000 Republican National Convention. She was involved in George W. Bush's 2000 presidential campaign, one of the first Pennsylvania Republicans to endorse the then-Texas governor. In 2001, she was named to the PoliticsPA list of "Pennsylvania's Most Politically Powerful Women"

In 2002, she was named to the PoliticsPA "Power 50" list of politically influential personalities. In 2003, the Pennsylvania Report named her to "The Pennsylvania Report Power 75" list of influential figures in Pennsylvania politics. In 2010, Politics Magazine named her one of the most influential Pennsylvania Republicans.

In 2006, Toretti chaired Lynn Swann's 2006 Pennsylvania gubernatorial campaign.

On May 18, 2018, president Donald Trump nominated Toretti to become the United States ambassador to Malta. However, the U.S. Senate never confirmed Toretti, and returned her nomination in 2019 and 2020.

In January 2025, Trump again nominated Toretti, this time to become the United States ambassador to Sweden. She was sworn in on October 2, 2025 by Vice President JD Vance and presented her credentials to the King of Sweden Carl XVI Gustaf on 21 October.

== Personal life ==
Toretti met University of Arizona basketball coach Lute Olson at an NCAA dinner. They married in Las Vegas, Nevada on April 14, 2003. During their marriage, she and her three sons split time between her home on a 200-acre (0.81 km^{2}) farm in Indiana, Pennsylvania and Tucson, Arizona. Olson filed for divorce on December 6, 2007. The proceedings became contentious, with Toretti alleging that Olson improperly moved funds from a joint account the day after filing for divorce.

Toretti serves on several corporate boards, including S&T Bank and the Lockhart Company. Toretti is an ex-officio advisor to the Indiana County Chamber of Commerce. She previously served as the foundation for the Indiana University of Pennsylvania president, and as a boardmember of The Andy Warhol Museum advisory board, Indiana hospital board, Chi Omega foundation, and The Committee of 200.

Diplomatic posts
Preceded by Erik Ramanathan	United States Ambassador to Sweden; 2025–present	Incumbent
