= H. Freeman Matthews =

American diplomat (1899–1986)

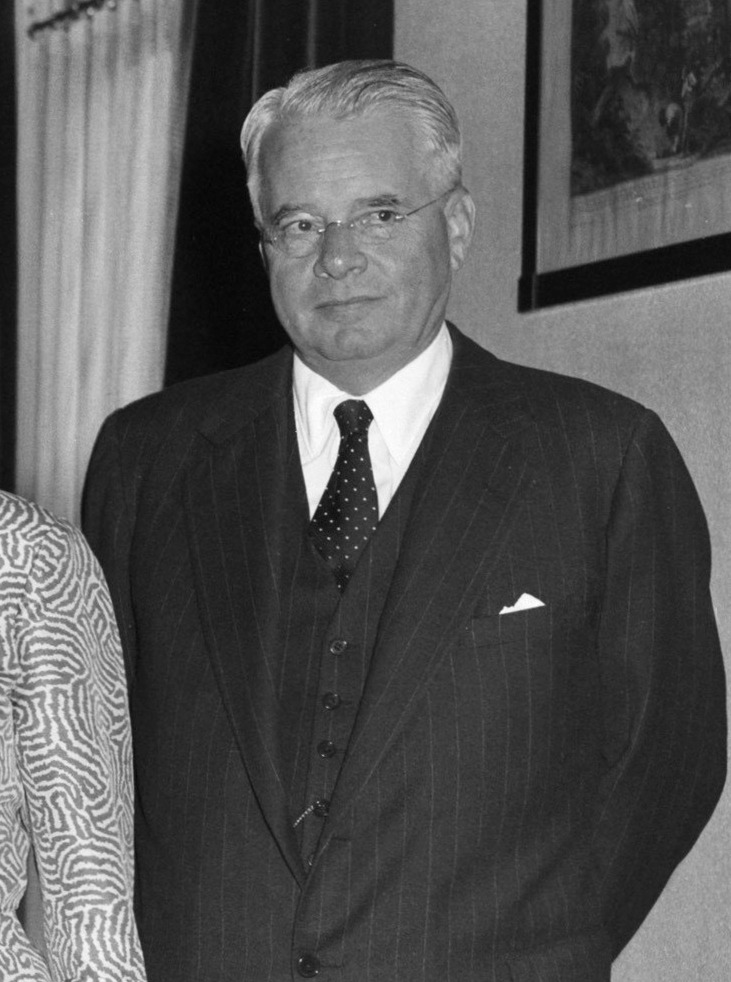
- Matthews in the Netherlands in 1956

United States Ambassador to Austria
- In office September 4, 1957 – May 25, 1962
- President: Dwight D. Eisenhower; John F. Kennedy
- Preceded by: Llewellyn Thompson
- Succeeded by: James Williams Riddleberger

United States Ambassador to the Netherlands
- In office November 25, 1953 – June 11, 1957
- President: Dwight D. Eisenhower
- Preceded by: Selden Chapin
- Succeeded by: Philip Young

United States Ambassador to Sweden
- In office December 5, 1947 – May 24, 1950
- President: Harry Truman
- Preceded by: Louis G. Dreyfus
- Succeeded by: W. Walton Butterworth

Acting United States Ambassador to Spain
- In office June 5, 1939 – October 19, 1939
- President: Franklin D. Roosevelt
- Preceded by: Claude G. Bowers
- Succeeded by: Alexander W. Weddell

Personal details
- Born: Harrison Freeman Matthews; May 26, 1899 Baltimore, Maryland, U.S.
- Died: October 19, 1986 (aged 87) Washington, D.C., U.S.
- Spouses: Elizabeth Rodgers Luke (m. 1925; died 1955) Helen Lewis Skouland (m. 1957; died 1966) Elizabeth Bluntschli (m. 1967)

Harrison Freeman Matthews (May 26, 1899 – October 19, 1986) was an American career diplomat who served as Ambassador to three European countries. He was born on May 26, 1899, and served in the United States Navy during World War I, and became a career employee of the United States Department of State in 1924. He died on October 19, 1986, at 87 years old.

== Early life ==
Harrison Freeman "Doc" Matthews was born in Baltimore, Maryland, on May 26, 1899.

He served in the United States Navy during World War I, and received bachelor's (1921) and master's (1922) degrees from Princeton University. From 1922 to 1923 he studied at the École Libre des Sciences Politiques, in Paris, France.

== Career ==
Matthews became a career employee of the United States Department of State, and his assignments included secretary positions in Budapest (1924 to 1926) and Bogotá (1926 to 1929). From 1930 to 1933 he served at the State Department as Deputy Chief of the Latin American Affairs Division. In 1933, Matthews moved to a secretary position in Havana, Cuba, where he served until 1937. He occupied a similar position in Paris, France, from 1937 to 1940, and was the consul there from 1938 to 1940. During 1939 he was acting Ambassador to Spain.

From 1940 to 1941 he was First Secretary in the U.S. embassy to France during the Vichy French government. Just before France's surrender to Germany in 1940 he took custody of the Versailles Treaty and the Treaty of Westphalia from the French foreign office, which he then had couriered to the United States for safe-keeping for the duration of the war.

From 1941 to 1943 he was counselor at the American embassy in London, England.

From 1943 to 1947, he served again at the State Department, assigned as Chief of the European Affairs Division and Director of the Office of European Affairs. During the Yalta Conference he and Harry Hopkins convinced President Franklin D. Roosevelt to accede to Winston Churchill's and Anthony Eden's demands that France be given a seat on the Allied Control Council alongside the US, the USSR, and the UK. Matthews was Ambassador to Sweden from 1947 to 1950. From 1950 to 1953, he served as Deputy Undersecretary of State. He was acting Secretary of State for the one day between the departure of Dean Acheson and the swearing in of John Foster Dulles.

In 1953, Matthews was appointed to succeed Selden Chapin as Ambassador to the Netherlands, and he remained in this post until 1957 when he was replaced by Philip Young. He succeeded Llewellyn Thompson as the Ambassador to Austria from 1957 until his 1962 retirement when he was succeeded by James Williams Riddleberger.

=== Later career ===
After his retirement from the Foreign Service, he served from 1963 to 1969 as a member of the CIA's Board of National Estimates and as the American chairman of the Permanent Joint Board on Defense, between America and Canada, from 1963 to 1969.

== Personal life ==
In 1925, Matthews was married to Covington, Virginia-born Elizabeth Rodgers "Frisk" Luke (1900–1955), daughter of Thomas Luke of Tarrytown, New York. Before his first wife's death from cancer in 1955, they were the parents of:

- H. Freeman Matthews Jr. (1927–2006), who was also a career diplomat.
- Thomas Luke Matthews (1933–1993), who married Emily Hill, daughter of Charles Beekman Hill Jr., in 1957.

After the death of his first wife, in 1957 he remarried to Helen Lewis Skouland, a former member of the United States Foreign Service who died aboard the MV Kungsholm in 1966. He remarried for a third time to Elizabeth Bluntschli in 1967.

Matthews died in Washington, D.C., on October 19, 1986. He is buried at Friends Cemetery in Baltimore.

Diplomatic posts
| Preceded by Louis G. Dreyfus Jr. | United States Ambassador to Sweden; September 20, 1947 – May 24, 1950 | Succeeded by W. Walton Butterworth |
| Preceded by Selden Chapin | United States Ambassador to the Netherlands; November 25, 1953 – June 11, 1957 | Succeeded by Philip Young |
| Preceded by Llewellyn Thompson | United States Ambassador to Austria; August 5, 1957 – May 25, 1962 | Succeeded by James W. Riddleberger |
