= List of ambassadors of the United States to Sweden =

Ambassador of the United States to the Kingdom of Sweden
- Förenta staternas ambassadör i Konungariket Sverige

- United States ambassador flag

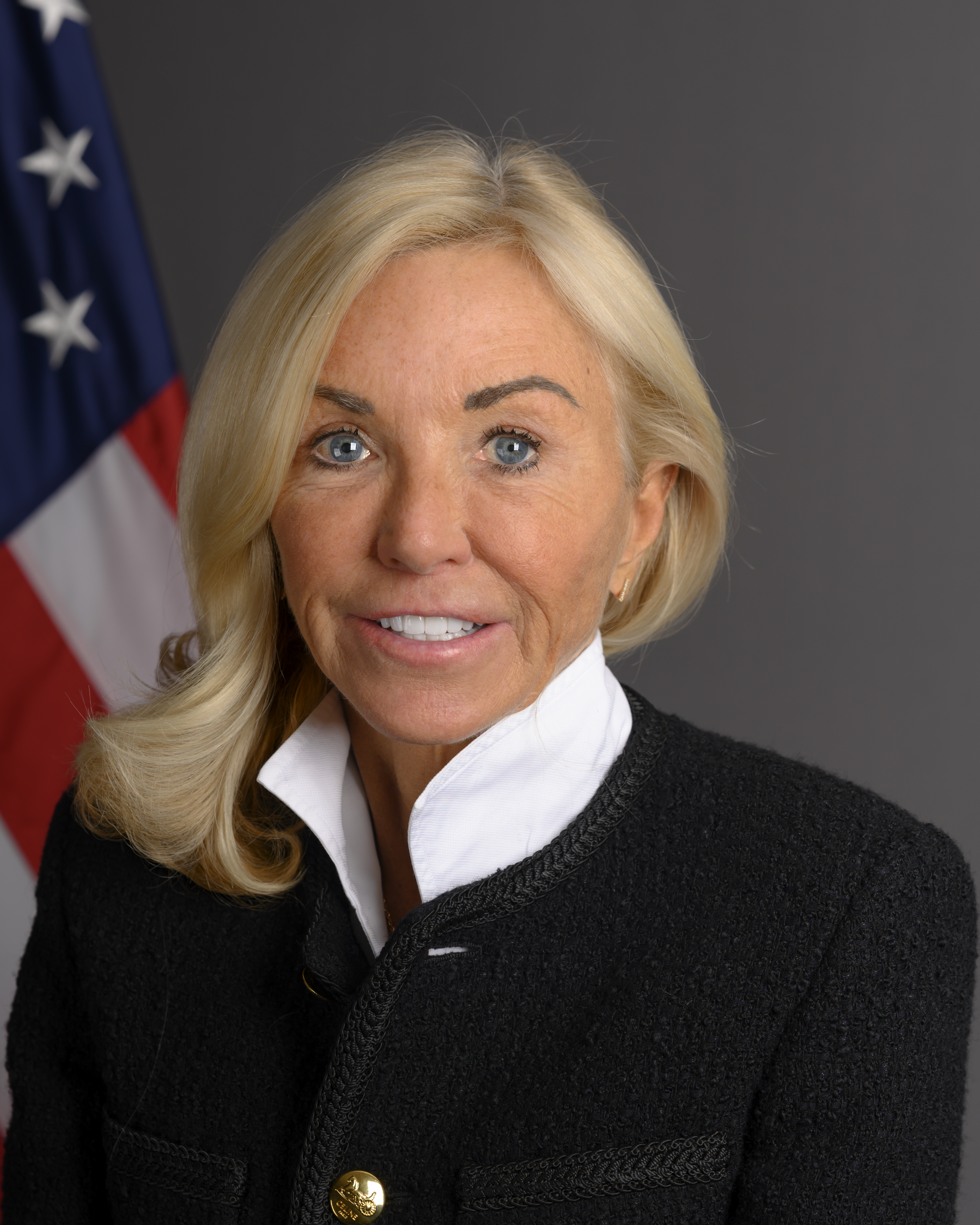
- Incumbent; Christine Toretti since October 21, 2025
- U.S. Department of State; Embassy of the United States, Stockholm
- Reports to: U.S. Secretary of State
- Residence: Villa Åkerlund
- Seat: Stockholm, Sweden
- Nominator: The president
- Appointer: The president with the advice and consent of the Senate
- Term length: At the pleasure of the president No fixed term
- Inaugural holder: Benjamin Franklin as Minister Plenipotentiary
- Formation: September 28, 1782
- Website: U.S. Embassy – Stockholm

The United States ambassador to the Kingdom of Sweden (Swedish: Förenta Staternas ambassadör i Konungariket Sverige) serves as the official diplomatic representative of the United States to the King and the Government of the Kingdom of Sweden. Diplomatic relations between Sweden and the United States began with the signing of the Treaty of Amity and Commerce in 1783. Sweden received its first U.S. resident minister in 1814, but in 1818, the senior U.S. diplomat again became the chargé d'affaires. In 1854, the senior American diplomat in Sweden again became the minister resident. From 1814 to 1905 the United States Chief of Mission in Sweden also represented United States interests with respect to Norway, as Norway was aligned with Sweden during this period in the Union between Sweden and Norway.

The contemporary tendency of American presidents is to appoint fundraisers or prominent campaign supporters to the ambassador's post in Sweden, rather than promoting career members of the United States Foreign Service. The position is currently vacant.

== Residence ==
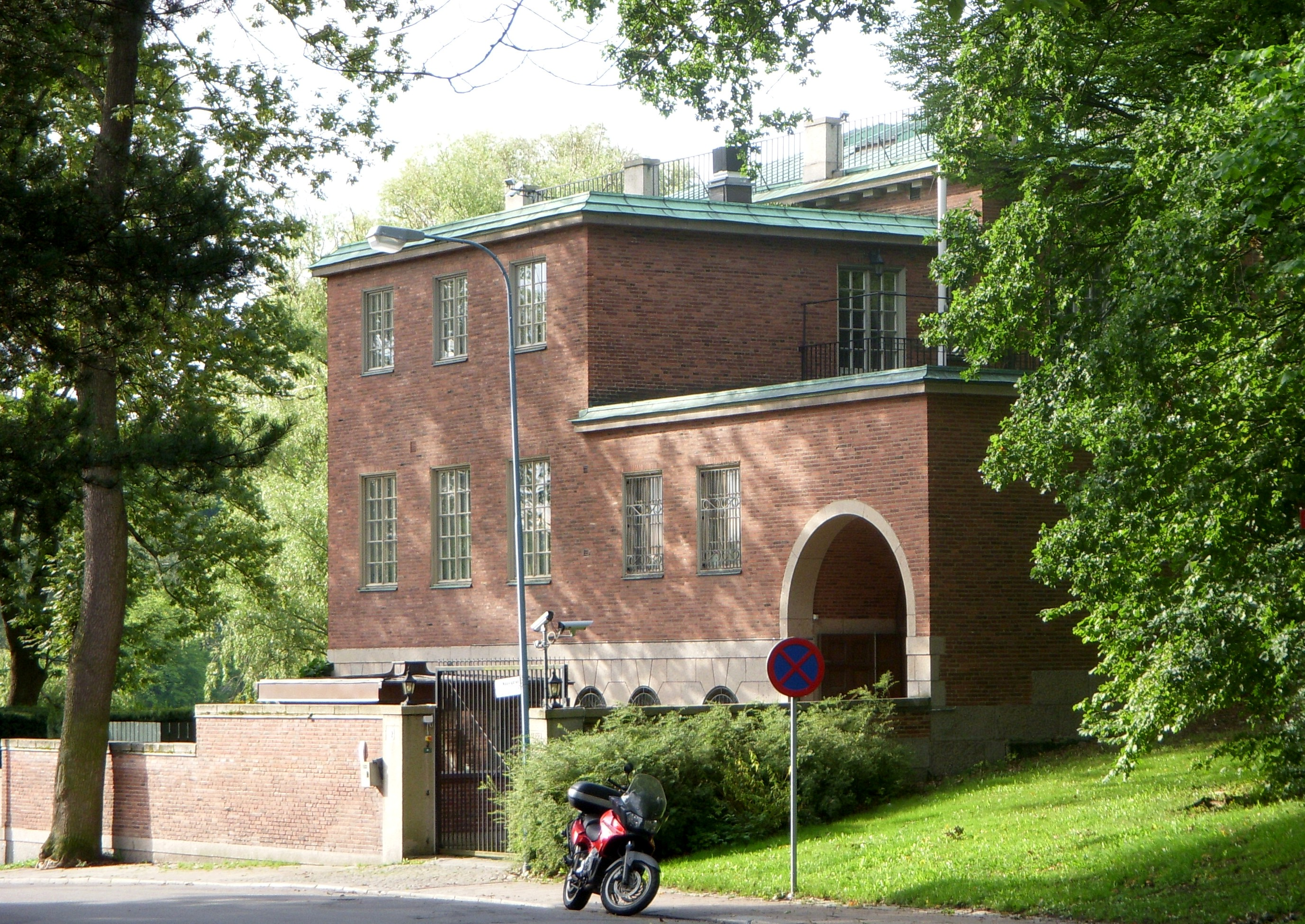
The residence ("Villa Åkerlund") of the U.S. Ambassador in Stockholm, Sweden.

Since the 1930s, the ambassador is resident in the ambassadorial residence, Villa Åkerlund, of the United States Embassy in Diplomatstaden, Stockholm.

== List of American chiefs of mission to Sweden ==
=== 18th century ===
Portrait	Representative	Title	Appointment	Presentation of credentials	Termination of mission
	Benjamin Franklin	Minister Plenipotentiary	September 28, 1782	Note: Was in Paris as U.S. ambassador to France; negotiated treaty with the Swedish Ambassador in Paris.	April 3, 1783

=== 1814–1854 (non-resident minister) ===
Portrait	Representative	Title	Appointment	Presentation of credentials	Termination of mission
	Jonathan Russell	Minister Plenipotentiary	January 18, 1814	April 29, 1818	October 22, 1818
	Christopher Hughes	Chargé d'Affaires	January 21, 1819		July 5, 1825
	William C. Somerville	Chargé d'Affaires	March 9, 1825		Died en route to post
	John James Appleton	Chargé d'Affaires	May 2, 1826	October 28, 1826	August 16, 1830
	Christopher Hughes	Chargé d'Affaires	March 3, 1830	August 16, 1830	September 22, 1841
	George W. Lay	Chargé d'Affaires	May 12, 1842	October 4, 1842	October 11, 1845
	Henry W. Ellsworth	Chargé d'Affaires	April 19, 1845	October 11, 1845	January 25, 1861
	Francis Schroeder	Chargé d'Affaires	November 7, 1849	April 22, 1850	June 29, 1854

=== 1854–1885 (minister resident) ===
Portrait	Representative	Title	Appointment	Presentation of credentials	Termination of mission
	Francis Schroeder	Minister Resident	June 29, 1854	August 19, 1854	September 17, 1857
	Benjamin F. Angel	Minister Resident	July 17, 1857	November 4, 1857	June 25, 1861
	Jacob S. Haldeman	Minister Resident	March 16, 1861	June 25, 1861	September 24, 1864
	James H. Campbell	Minister Resident	May 18, 1864	Sep 24, 1864	March 29, 1867
	John McGinnis, Jr.	Minister Resident	November 16, 1866		Did not proceed to post, his nomination having been rejected by the Senate while he was en route.
	Joseph J. Bartlett	Minister Resident	March 19, 1867	June 4, 1867	July 24, 1869
	John S. Carlile	Minister Resident			Not commissioned
	Christopher Columbus Andrews	Minister Resident	June 3, 1869	July 24, 1869	November 5, 1877
	John L. Stevens	Minister Resident	August 28, 1877	November 5, 1877	June 3, 1883
	William W. Thomas, Jr.	Minister Resident	June 6, 1883	September 6, 1883	June 30, 1885
	Rufus Magee	Minister Resident	April 2, 1885	July 3, 1885	Promoted to Envoy Extraordinary and Minister Plenipotentiary

=== 1885–1947 (envoy extraordinary and minister plenipotentiary) ===
Portrait	Representative	Title	Appointment	Presentation of credentials	Termination of mission
	Rufus Magee	Envoy Extraordinary and Minister Plenipotentiary	August 10, 1888	September 26, 1888	May 25, 1889
	William W. Thomas, Jr.	Envoy Extraordinary and Minister Plenipotentiary	March 19, 1889	May 27, 1889	May 2, 1894
	Thomas B. Ferguson	Envoy Extraordinary and Minister Plenipotentiary	February 14, 1894	May 2, 1894	February 7, 1898
	William W. Thomas, Jr.	Envoy Extraordinary and Minister Plenipotentiary	December 18, 1898	February 8, 1898	May 31, 1905
	Charles H. Graves	Envoy Extraordinary and Minister Plenipotentiary	March 8, 1905	May 31, 1905	December 12, 1913
	Ira Nelson Morris	Envoy Extraordinary and Minister Plenipotentiary	July 13, 1914	August 28, 1914	April 3, 1923
	Robert Woods Bliss	Envoy Extraordinary and Minister Plenipotentiary	January 30, 1923	August 8, 1923	March 15, 1927
	Leland Harrison	Envoy Extraordinary and Minister Plenipotentiary	February 26, 1927	May 31, 1927	November 11, 1929
	John Motley Morehead III	Envoy Extraordinary and Minister Plenipotentiary	January 22, 1930	March 31, 1930	April 6, 1933
	Laurence A. Steinhardt	Envoy Extraordinary and Minister Plenipotentiary	May 11, 1933	August 28, 1933	June 26, 1937
	Fred Morris Dearing	Envoy Extraordinary and Minister Plenipotentiary	April 22, 1937	September 23, 1937	June 17, 1938
	Frederick A. Sterling	Envoy Extraordinary and Minister Plenipotentiary	June 16, 1938	September 26, 1938	July 14, 1941
	Herschel V. Johnson	Envoy Extraordinary and Minister Plenipotentiary	October 21, 1941	December 12, 1941	April 28, 1946
	Louis G. Dreyfus, Jr.	Envoy Extraordinary and Minister Plenipotentiary	August 1, 1946	January 3, 1947	October 6, 1947
	H. Freeman Matthews	Envoy Extraordinary and Minister Plenipotentiary	July 21, 1947		

=== 1947–present day (ambassador extraordinary and plenipotentiary) ===
Portrait	Representative	Title	Appointment	Presentation of credentials	Termination of mission
	H. Freeman Matthews	Ambassador Extraordinary and Plenipotentiary	September 20, 1947	December 5, 1947	May 24, 1950
	W. Walton Butterworth	Ambassador Extraordinary and Plenipotentiary	July 5, 1950	September 18, 1950	December 9, 1953
	John M. Cabot	Ambassador Extraordinary and Plenipotentiary	March 1, 1954	May 6, 1954	May 14, 1957
	Francis White	Ambassador Extraordinary and Plenipotentiary	June 3, 1957	September 17, 1957	December 9, 1958
	James C.H. Bonbright	Ambassador Extraordinary and Plenipotentiary	October 29, 1958	January 9, 1959	March 20, 1961
	J. Graham Parsons	Ambassador Extraordinary and Plenipotentiary	March 15, 1961	May 16, 1961	April 17, 1967
	William Womack Heath	Ambassador Extraordinary and Plenipotentiary	April 5, 1967	May 23, 1967	January 23, 1969
	Vacant	No ambassador appointed	January 24, 1969		February 15, 1970
	Jerome H. Holland	Ambassador Extraordinary and Plenipotentiary	February 16, 1970	April 14, 1970	August 30, 1972
	Arthur J. Olsen	Chargé d'Affaires ad interim	December 1972		May 1974
	Robert Strausz-Hupé	Ambassador Extraordinary and Plenipotentiary	April 25, 1974	May 29, 1974	March 3, 1976
	David S. Smith	Ambassador Extraordinary and Plenipotentiary	April 6, 1976	May 7, 1976	April 29, 1977
	Rodney O'Gliasain Kennedy-Minott	Ambassador Extraordinary and Plenipotentiary	August 3, 1977	September 29, 1977	September 26, 1980
	Franklin S. Forsberg	Ambassador Extraordinary and Plenipotentiary	December 11, 1981	January 14, 1982	December 12, 1985
	Gregory J. Newell	Ambassador Extraordinary and Plenipotentiary	December 9, 1985	December 19, 1985	June 12, 1989
	Charles Edgar Redman	Ambassador Extraordinary and Plenipotentiary	May 12, 1989	June 13, 1989	August 24, 1992
	Thomas L. Siebert	Ambassador Extraordinary and Plenipotentiary	February 9, 1994	March 24, 1994	December 17, 1997
	Lyndon Lowell Olson, Jr.	Ambassador Extraordinary and Plenipotentiary	November 10, 1997	January 22, 1998	August 1, 2001
	Charles A. Heimbold, Jr.	Ambassador Extraordinary and Plenipotentiary	August 3, 2001	September 26, 2001	February 12, 2004
	Miles T. Bivins	Ambassador Extraordinary and Plenipotentiary	May 25, 2004	June 9, 2004	January 31, 2006
	Michael M. Wood	Ambassador Extraordinary and Plenipotentiary	May 30, 2006	June 8, 2006	January 20, 2009
	Matthew Barzun	Ambassador Extraordinary and Plenipotentiary	August 12, 2009	August 21, 2009	May 28, 2011
	Mark Brzezinski	Ambassador Extraordinary and Plenipotentiary	October 18, 2011	November 24, 2011	July 1, 2015
	Robert S. Gilchrist	Chargé d'Affaires ad interim	July 1, 2015		March 1, 2016
	Azita Raji	Ambassador Extraordinary and Plenipotentiary	February 1, 2016	March 1, 2016	January 20, 2017
	David Lindwall	Chargé d'Affaires ad interim	January 20, 2017		December 18, 2018
	Pamela Tremont	Chargé d'Affaires ad interim	April 2019		November 7, 2019
	Ken Howery	Ambassador Extraordinary and Plenipotentiary	September 17, 2019	November 7, 2019	January 20, 2021
	Pamela Tremont	Chargé d'Affaires ad interim	January 20, 2021		June 12, 2021
	Dillon Banerjee	Chargé d'Affaires ad interim	June 12, 2021		July 22, 2021
	Pamela Tremont	Chargé d'Affaires ad interim	July 23, 2021		January 20, 2022
	Erik Ramanathan	Ambassador Extraordinary and Plenipotentiary	December 18, 2021	January 20, 2022	January 20, 2025
	Mark Evans	Chargé d'Affaires ad interim	January 20, 2025		June 30, 2025
	Anna Radivilova	Chargé d'Affaires ad interim	June 30, 2025		August 1, 2025
	Viraj LeBailly	Chargé d'Affaires ad interim	August 1, 2025		October 20, 2025
	Christine Toretti	Ambassador Extraordinary and Plenipotentiary	September 18, 2025	October 21, 2025	Incumbent

== See also ==
- List of ambassadors of Sweden to the United States
- Embassy of the United States, Stockholm
- Foreign relations of Sweden
- Foreign relations of the United States
