= Christopher Van Hollen Sr. =

American diplomat (1922–2013)

Christopher Van Hollen
- Van Hollen in the Haverford College yearbook, 1947

United States Ambassador to Sri Lanka
- In office October 27, 1972 – April 21, 1976
- President: Richard Nixon; Gerald Ford
- Preceded by: Robert Strausz-Hupé
- Succeeded by: John H. Reed

United States Ambassador to the Maldives
- In office December 10, 1972 – April 26, 1976
- President: Richard Nixon; Gerald Ford
- Preceded by: Robert Strausz-Hupé
- Succeeded by: John H. Reed

Personal details
- Born: September 23, 1922 Baltimore, Maryland, U.S.
- Died: January 30, 2013 (aged 90) Washington, D.C., U.S.
- Spouse: Edith Farnsworth (m. 1953; died 2007)
- Children: 3, including Christopher Jr.
- Education: Haverford College (BA); Johns Hopkins University (MA, PhD)

Christopher Van Hollen Sr. (September 23, 1922 – January 30, 2013) was an American diplomat who served as the United States Ambassador to Sri Lanka and the Maldives from 1972 until 1976. He was the father of U.S. Senator Chris Van Hollen.

== Biography ==
=== Early life ===
Van Hollen was born in Baltimore, and was raised in the city's northern Cedarcroft neighborhood. His mother, Cecilia Harvey (Coale; 1897–1975), was a secretary for the League of Women Voters, while his father, Donald Beauchamp Van Hollen (1893–1974), worked for the Baltimore Gas and Electric Company, before joining the family's seafood business. Christopher's grandfather, George Henry Van Hollen (1865–1928), owned the Atlantic Packing Co. The Van Hollen family, the namesake of Baltimore's Hollen Road, helped to develop the Cedarcroft section of North Baltimore.

He graduated from Baltimore's Gilman School preparatory school in 1941. He briefly attended Haverford College in Pennsylvania, but left to enlist in the United States Navy in 1942 during World War II. He was honorably discharged as a lieutenant for a naval transport ship at the end of the war. Van Hollen re-enrolled at Haverford College following World War II and received a bachelor's degree in 1947. He next earned a doctorate in political science from Johns Hopkins University in 1951. He also graduated from the Naval War College and completed academic studies at the University of California, Berkeley. While studying at Johns Hopkins, Van Hollen worked as the campaign manager for congressional candidate Leo McCormick in his Democratic primary challenge against incumbent U.S. Rep. George Fallon in 1948. Rep. Fallon easily dispatched McCormick in the primary.

Van Hollen married Edith Eliza Farnsworth, a CIA Russian studies expert at the time, in 1953. Eliza Van Hollen later became a noted specialist and chief analyst on Afghanistan within the Bureau of Intelligence and Research at the U.S. State Department.

=== Career ===
Van Hollen joined U.S. Secretary of State Dean Acheson's executive secretariat shortly after completing his doctorate at Johns Hopkins. He attended the NATO Ministerial meeting in Lisbon in February 1952, which admitted Greece and the host nation, Portugal, into NATO.

He was posted as a political officer at the U.S. embassy in New Delhi, India, in 1955. He also received postings in Calcutta (now Kolkata), Pakistan and Turkey. He was appointed deputy assistant secretary for the Near East and South Asia in 1969. In 1971, he openly disagreed with National Security Adviser Henry Kissinger's handling of the Bangladesh Liberation War, which led to Bangladesh's independence.

He was appointed as U.S. Ambassador to Sri Lanka and the Maldives in 1972 by President Richard Nixon.

In 1980 he published a widely quoted article, titled "The Tilt Policy Revisited", about the handling of the 1971 crisis in South Asia in the journal Asian Survey.

Christopher Van Hollen died from Alzheimer's disease on January 30, 2013, at the Washington Home and Hospice in Washington, D.C., at the age of 90. His wife, Eliza, died in 2007. He was survived by three children, then-U.S. Rep. Chris Van Hollen Jr., Caroline Van Hollen, and Cecilia Van Hollen; two sisters, Margaret Lee of Baltimore and Cecilia Van Hollen; and five grandchildren.

Diplomatic posts
Preceded by Robert Strausz-Hupé	U.S. Ambassador to Sri Lanka; 1972–1976	Succeeded by John H. Reed
