= Joe Gibson (politician) =

American politician (1938–2024)

Member of the Waco City Council
- In office 1974–1978

Member of the Texas House of Representatives from the 35B district
- In office 1979–1981
- Preceded by: Lyndon Lowell Olson Jr.
- Succeeded by: Rollin Khoury

Personal details
- Born: October 4, 1938 Amarillo, Texas, U.S.
- Died: October 11, 2024 (aged 86) Clifton, Texas, U.S.
- Party: Democratic

Joe Travis Gibson Jr. (October 4, 1938 – October 11, 2024) was an American politician in the state of Texas. He served as a member of the Waco City Council from 1974 to 1978 and as a Democratic member of the Texas House of Representatives, representing the Waco-based District 35B from 1979 to 1981. He lost renomination in 1980. A lawyer and real estate agent, he died in Clifton, Texas on October 11, 2024, at the age of 86.

== Electoral history ==
=== 1978 ===
Texas House of Representatives, District 35B, 1978 primary * denotes incumbent Source:
Party	Candidate	Votes	%
Democratic	Joe Gibson	10,805	51.3
Democratic	Rod Goble	6,280	29.8
Democratic	Andy Anderson	2,590	12.3
Democratic	Ray Atkinson	1,404	6.7
Total votes		21,079	100

Texas House of Representatives, District 35B, 1978 election * denotes incumbent Source:
Party	Candidate	Votes	%
Democratic	Joe Gibson	14,967	63.1
Republican	Gordon Erkfitz	8,739	36.9
Total votes		23,706	100

=== 1980 ===
Texas House of Representatives, District 35B, 1980 primary * denotes incumbent Source:
Party	Candidate	Votes	%
Democratic	Doug Henager	6,785	50.4
Democratic	Joe Gibson*	6,674	49.6
Total votes		13,459	100
