= Lyndon Lowell Olson Jr. =

American businessman, politician and diplomat

Lyndon L. Olson Jr.

United States Ambassador to Sweden
- In office January 22, 1998 – August 1, 2001
- President: Bill Clinton; George W. Bush
- Preceded by: Thomas L. Siebert
- Succeeded by: Charles A. Heimbold Jr.

Member of the Texas House of Representatives from the 35th district
- In office January 9, 1973 – January 9, 1979
- Preceded by: Tom Moore Jr.
- Succeeded by: Joe Gibson

Personal details
- Born: March 7, 1947 (age 79) Waco, Texas, U.S.
- Party: Democratic
- Spouse: Kay Woodward Olson
- Education: Baylor University
- Profession: Banker

Lyndon Lowell Olson Jr. (born March 7, 1947) is an American business executive and diplomat. He served as U.S Ambassador to Sweden between 1997 and 2001.

== Business career ==
Olson had a long career in insurance industry. From 1979 to 1987, he was Chairman of the Texas State Board of Insurance and in 1982 served as president of the National Association of Insurance Commissioners. He worked for Citigroup between 1990-1998.

He currently serves as chairman of public relations firm Hill & Knowlton in New York City.

== Political and diplomatic career ==
Olson served as a member of the Texas House of Representatives from 1973 until 1979.

In 1997 Olson was nominated by President Clinton to be Ambassador to Sweden and went on to serve in this capacity until 2001.

Mr. Olson served as a negotiator on the U.S. Israeli Free Trade Agreement.

== Awards ==
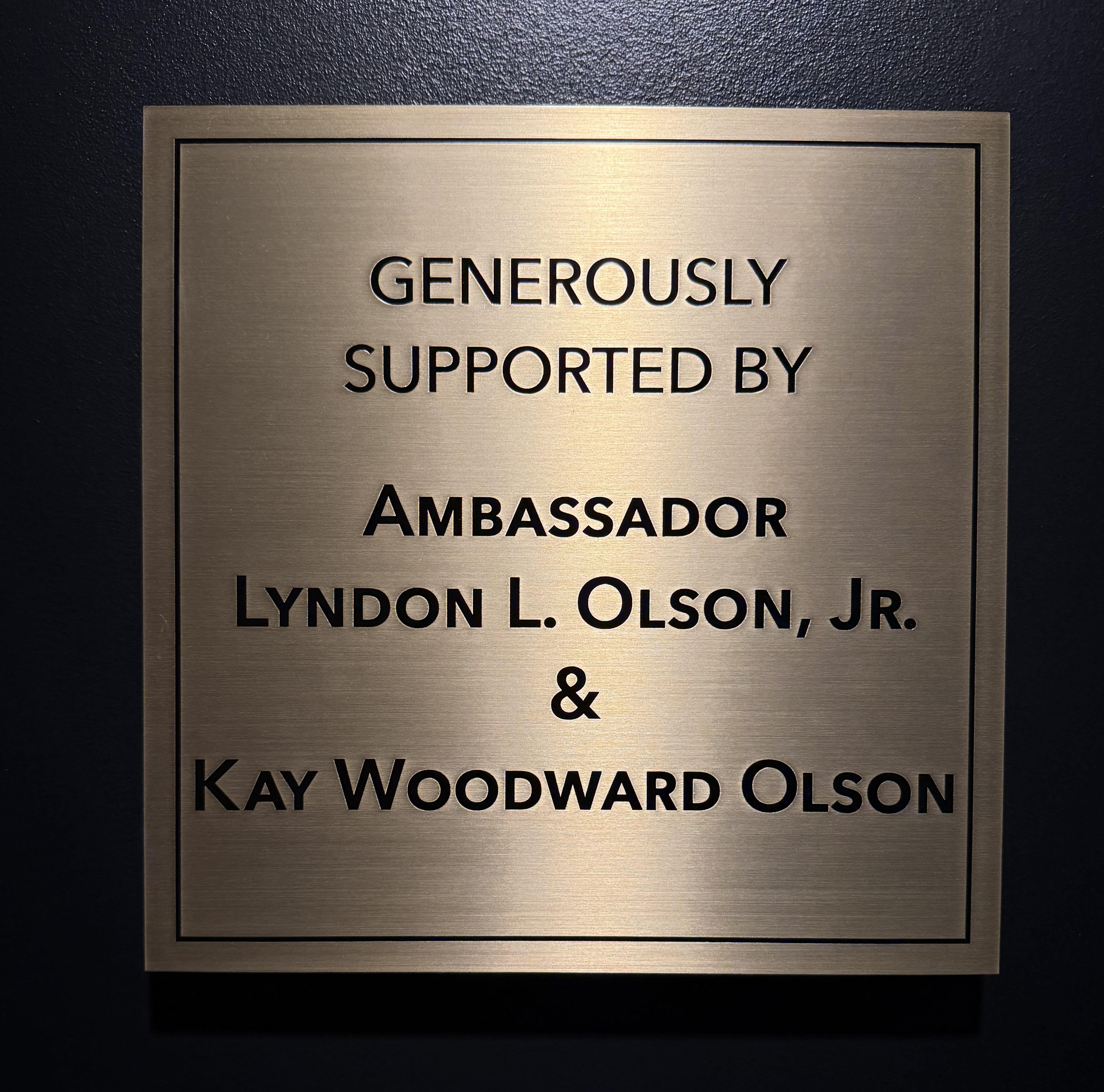
A plaque at the LBJ Presidential Library in Austin notes the philanthropic support of Olson and his wife.

In 2002, King Carl XVI Gustaf of Sweden presented him with the Swedish-American of the Year Award. He was also awarded the Ellis Island Medal of Honor in 2001. The recipient of an honorary doctorate from Sweden's Umeå University, Olson has served as the chairman and is a member of the board of directors of the Swedish American Chamber of Commerce and is a Trustee of the American Scandinavian Foundation, both in New York City. In 2007 Olson was presented the Order of the Polar Star by the King and Queen of Sweden. Olson has served as a Commissioner and Vice Chairman of the United States Advisory Commission on Public Diplomacy having been appointed by President George W. Bush.

Olson is a recipient of the Gates of Jerusalem Award from the State of Israel and serves on the board of the Jerusalem Foundation. In 1999, he received Baylor University's Distinguished Alumni Award and in 2002 its Price Daniel Distinguished Public Service Award. Born in 1947, Mr. Olson is an active member of the Council on Foreign Relations and the Council of American Ambassadors.

== Education ==
Olson is a graduate of Baylor University and attended Baylor Law School.

== Personal life ==
He is a member and Elder of the First Presbyterian Church in Waco, Texas.

Texas House of Representatives
Preceded by Tom Moore Jr.	Member of the Texas House of Representatives from District 35 (Waco); 1973–1978	Succeeded by Joe Gibson
Diplomatic posts
Preceded by Thomas L. Siebert	U.S. Ambassador to Sweden; 1997–2001	Succeeded by Charles A. Heimbold Jr.
