= Molly Beth Malcolm =

American educator and politician

Dr. Molly Beth Beene Malcolm (born April 26, 1955) is an American educator and former politician. She is the executive vice chancellor of operations and public affairs for Austin Community College in Austin, Texas.

== Early life and education ==
Born in Magnolia, Arkansas, and raised in Winnsboro, Texas, Malcolm earned an undergraduate degree from Southern Methodist University, a Master of Science from Texas A&M University-Texarkana, and a Doctor of Education degree in Educational Administration from The University of Texas at Austin. She is a Licensed Professional Counselor.

== Career ==
Malcolm began her career as a public schools counselor and elementary teacher in Arkansas, Oklahoma, and Texas. Her career then took a turn to politics after which she returned to school to pursue a career in higher education.

=== Politics ===
Originally a Republican, Malcolm worked for Clayton Williams′ 1990 campaign for governor of Texas against Ann W. Richards. In 1992, Malcolm became a Democrat. The Texas Democratic Party elected her as chairperson in 1998 and to two additional terms in 2000 and in 2002. The first woman to hold this position, she resigned on October 25, 2003.

=== Austin Community College ===
After earning her Doctor of Education, Malcolm was named a Special Assistant to the President/CEO. In this role she served as a senior advisor to the President on a broad scope of complex issues including the coordination of a successful $385 million bond election in 2014. She was then named Vice President of Community Engagement and Public Affairs, where she had direct supervisory responsibility for government and community relations, the Center for Nonprofit Studies, the Center for Public Policy and Political Studies, the ACC Alumni Network, the Student Government Association, international programs, the African American Cultural Center, and the Latino/Latin American Studies Center.

Malcolm was a driving force in the development of ACC's flagship Highland Campus. In 2017, Malcolm was named Executive Vice Chancellor of Operations and Public Affairs and serves on the Chancellor's Executive Leadership Team. In that role she oversaw ACC's COVID-19 response, and coordinated efforts for a successful $770 million bond election in 2022. In addition to overseeing campus operations across the community college, she also acts as ACC's a key point of contact to business leaders, government officials, international organizations, education leaders, and the general public.

=== The University of Texas at Austin ===
In addition to her leadership role at Austin Community College, Malcolm is a professor of Practice in the Department of Educational Leadership and Policy Doctoral Program at the University of Texas at Austin.

== Awards ==
In 2023, Malcolm was named an Honorary Alumnus of Leadership Austin. She was awarded the Austin Community College Chancellor's Leadership Excellence Award in 2022. Also in 2022 Malcolm was profiled as a Top Woman Leader of Austin in Women We Admire. In her adopted hometown of Texarkana, Malcolm has been recognized with the NAACP Torchbearer Award, the Martin Luther King Jr. Acts of Kindness Leadership Award, the Texarkana Community Journal Outstanding Woman Award, and the Alumni Achievement Award from Texas A&M University-Texarkana. October 25, 2010, Malcolm was named the 2010 Winnsboro High School distinguished alumna in Winnsboro in east Texas.

== Community service ==
Malcolm serves on the Board of Directors of University Federal Credit Union ($4.5 billion in assets), on the Opportunity Austin 5.0 Steering Committee, the Austin Economic Development Corporation, UTeach Advisory Council, Austin Healthcare Council, National Security Innovation Council, Downtown Austin Alliance, Annette Strauss Institute for Civic Life, and the Texas Lyceum Advisory Council.
