= Charles A. Heimbold Jr. =

American businessman and diplomat (1933–2024)

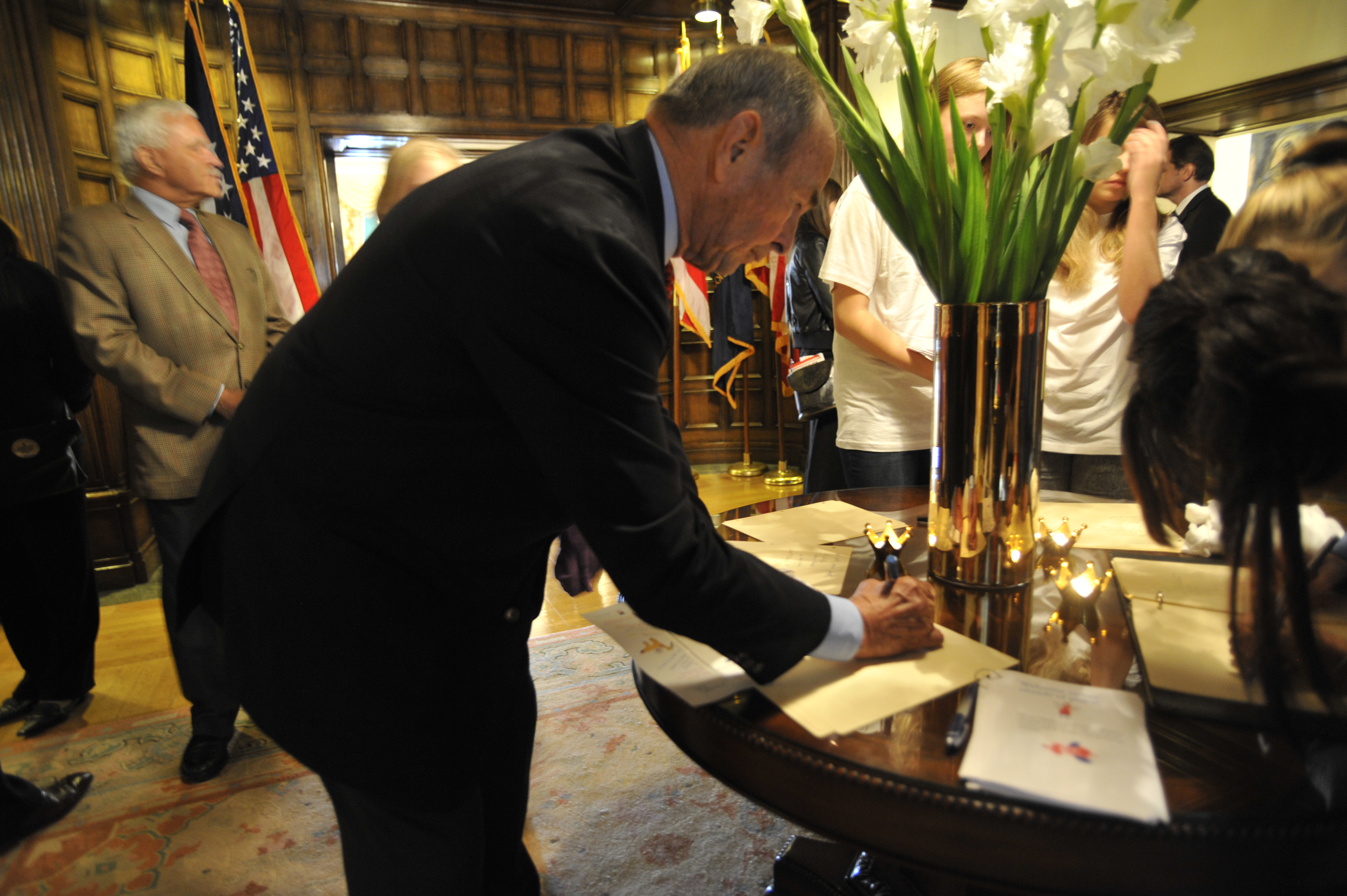
- Heimbold in 2011

United States Ambassador to Sweden
- In office September 26, 2001 – February 12, 2004
- President: George W. Bush
- Preceded by: Lyndon Lowell Olson Jr.
- Succeeded by: Teel Bivins

Personal details
- Born: May 27, 1933 Newark, New Jersey, U.S.
- Died: August 20, 2024 (aged 91) Riverside, Connecticut, U.S.
- Party: Republican
- Education: Villanova University (BA); University of Pennsylvania (JD); New York University (LLM)

Military service
- Allegiance: United States
- Branch/service: United States Navy
- Years of service: 1954–1957

Charles A. Heimbold Jr. (May 27, 1933 – August 20, 2024) was an American businessman and diplomat, who was Chairman and CEO of Bristol-Myers Squibb Company, and as U.S. Ambassador to Sweden. His son is American musician Pete Francis Heimbold, of Dispatch fame.

== Biography ==
Heimbold was an honors graduate of Villanova University, having graduated in 1954, and of the University of Pennsylvania Law School in 1960, where he was a member of the University of Pennsylvania Law Review. He also received a Master of Laws degree from New York University and completed a program at The Hague Academy of International Law in the summer of 1959.

Heimbold was Chairman and CEO of Bristol-Myers Squibb Company.

On April 13, 2001, Heimbold was nominated by President George W. Bush as U.S. Ambassador to Sweden. He was confirmed by the U.S. Senate on August 1, and sworn in on September 12 in New York City. Heimbold presented his credentials to King Carl XVI Gustaf in Stockholm on September 26, 2001.

Heimbold died at home in Riverside, Connecticut, on August 20, 2024, at the age of 91.

His son is American musician Pete Francis Heimbold, of Dispatch fame.

== Sources ==
- Charles A. Heimbold, Jr., Former U.S. Ambassador to Sweden
- A Brief History of Bristol-Myers Squibb

Diplomatic posts
Preceded by Lyndon Lowell Olson Jr.	United States Ambassador to Sweden; 2001–2004	Succeeded by Teel Bivins
