= Thomas L. Siebert =

American diplomat

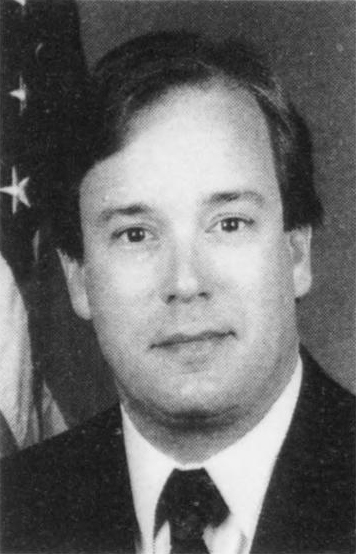
Thomas Siebert

Thomas Leland Siebert is an American lawyer and former diplomat. He was born to Virgil and Evelyn Siebert in Cleveland, Ohio, the second of four sons. Siebert was appointed United States Ambassador to Sweden in 1994 by President Bill Clinton and served in this capacity until 1998.

Siebert received his B.A. at Georgetown University and his J.D. at Georgetown University Law Center.

He was a member of the Council of American Ambassadors. In 1998, he served as Chairman of the International Telecommunication Union (ITU) Plenipotentiary Conference. The ITU – at the time composed of representatives of 189 Nations – is the United Nations' specialized agency devoted to telecommunications matters and is the highest decision-making body made up of representatives of governments belonging to an international treaty-making organization. Ambassador Siebert served as parliamentarian and negotiator on such contentious issues as Palestinian membership in the ITU.

Siebert served on the Diplomatic Council on Energy Security. This Council provides advice to Securing America's Energy Future (SAFE), a nonpartisan, not-for-profit organization committed to reducing America's dependence on oil and improving U.S. energy security. Ambassador Siebert also serves on the Board of Advisers of the International Criminal Court (ICC) Project which operates within the American Bar Association's (ABA) Center for Human Rights. The ICC Project's mission is to strengthen the U.S.-ICC relationship within many American circles. Ambassador Siebert is Chairman of the Stockholm International Peace Research Institute – North America (SIPRI-NA) headquartered in Washington, DC. SIPRI-NA's charter is to contribute to policy debates on global and regional security issues through dissemination of SIPRI research, analysis, and recommendations drawn from SIPRI's global networks.

He also served on the Board of American Citizens Abroad (ACA) Global Foundation.

He lives with his wife, Debbie, in Washington, D.C., and is the father of their four children: Sarah, Lauren, Thomas Siebert II (Teddy), and Trevor.

== See also ==
- List of notable Georgetown University alumni

== Sources ==
- Thomas L. Siebert on politicalgraveyard.com

Diplomatic posts
Preceded by Charles E. Redman	U.S. Ambassador to Sweden; 1994 - 1998	Succeeded by Lyndon Lowell Olson, Jr.
