= Rodney O'Gliasain Kennedy-Minott =

American historian

United States Ambassador to Sweden
- In office September 29, 1977 – September 26, 1980
- President: Jimmy Carter
- Preceded by: David S. Smith
- Succeeded by: William Cowles Hamilton

Personal details
- Born: June 1, 1928 Portland, Oregon, U.S.
- Died: December 15, 2004 (aged 76) Monterey, California, U.S.
- Party: Democratic
- Education: Stanford University
- Profession: Professor; Historian; Advisor

Military service
- Allegiance: United States of America
- Branch/service: United States Army
- Years of service: 1946–52
- Rank: Sergeant

Rodney O'Gliasain Kennedy-Minott (sometimes spelled Rodney Glisan Kennedy-Minott; June 1, 1928 – December 15, 2004) was an American diplomat, Democratic Party activist and professor.

== Early life ==
Rodney Glisan Minott was born to Joseph Albert Minott and wife Gainor Owen Baird, in Portland, Oregon, on June 1, 1928. His great-grandfather was Dr. Rodney Glisan. He served as a United States Army sergeant in Japan from 1946 until 52. He then studied at Stanford University, receiving his bachelor's in 1953, master's in 1956, and doctorate in 1960.

== Academic career ==
From 1960 until 1965, Kennedy-Minott was assistant director of the Western civilization history program at Stanford University, before becoming associate professor at Portland State University. In 1966, he became associate dean of instruction at California State University, where he became a full professor of U.S. history in 1969. He was a senior lecturer in national security affairs at the Naval Postgraduate School until his retirement in 2002.

From 1971 until 1973, he advised Thames Television on European emigration to the United States, and served as a researcher for The World at War.

== Political career ==
Kennedy-Minott worked on the 1964 United States Senate campaign of Pierre Salinger and the 1972 presidential campaign of George McGovern.

In 1976, Kennedy-Minott was chairman for the Northern California portion of Jimmy Carter's presidential campaign. In August 1977, Carter appointed him ambassador to Sweden, which he served as until September 1980. Carter was a close friend of Kennedy-Minott, and a frequent guest at his home in Atherton, California.

== Personal life ==
Kennedy-Minott was married to Polly Fitzhugh Kennedy (1929–1997), but they had divorced before her death. They had two daughters, Katherine Pardow and Polly Berry, and a son, Rodney Glisan. Kennedy-Minott had three grandchildren: Cambria Minott-Gaines, William Weihnacht and Joseph Minott.

He died from complications of pancreatitis on December 15, 2004.

== Published works ==
- Peerless Patriots: the Organized Veterans and the Spirit of Patriotism (1962)
- The Fortress That Never Was: the Myth of Hitler's Bavarian Stronghold (1964)
- The Sinking of the Lollipop: Shirley Temple vs. Pete McCloskey (1968)
- U.S. Regional Force Application: the Maritime Strategy and its Effect on Nordic Stability (1988, Hoover Institution)

Diplomatic posts
| Preceded by David S. Smith | U.S. Ambassador to Sweden; 1977–1980 | Succeeded by Franklin S. Forsberg |
