= Francis Schroeder =

American diplomat

Francis Schroeder was the Ambassador of the United States to the Kingdom of Sweden from June 29, 1854 to September 17, 1857 and chargé d'affaires to Sweden from November 7, 1849 until being appointed ambassador. He was married to Caroline Seaton Schroeder, the daughter of William Seaton, the owner of the newspaper the National Intelligencer and the 13th mayor of Washington, D.C.

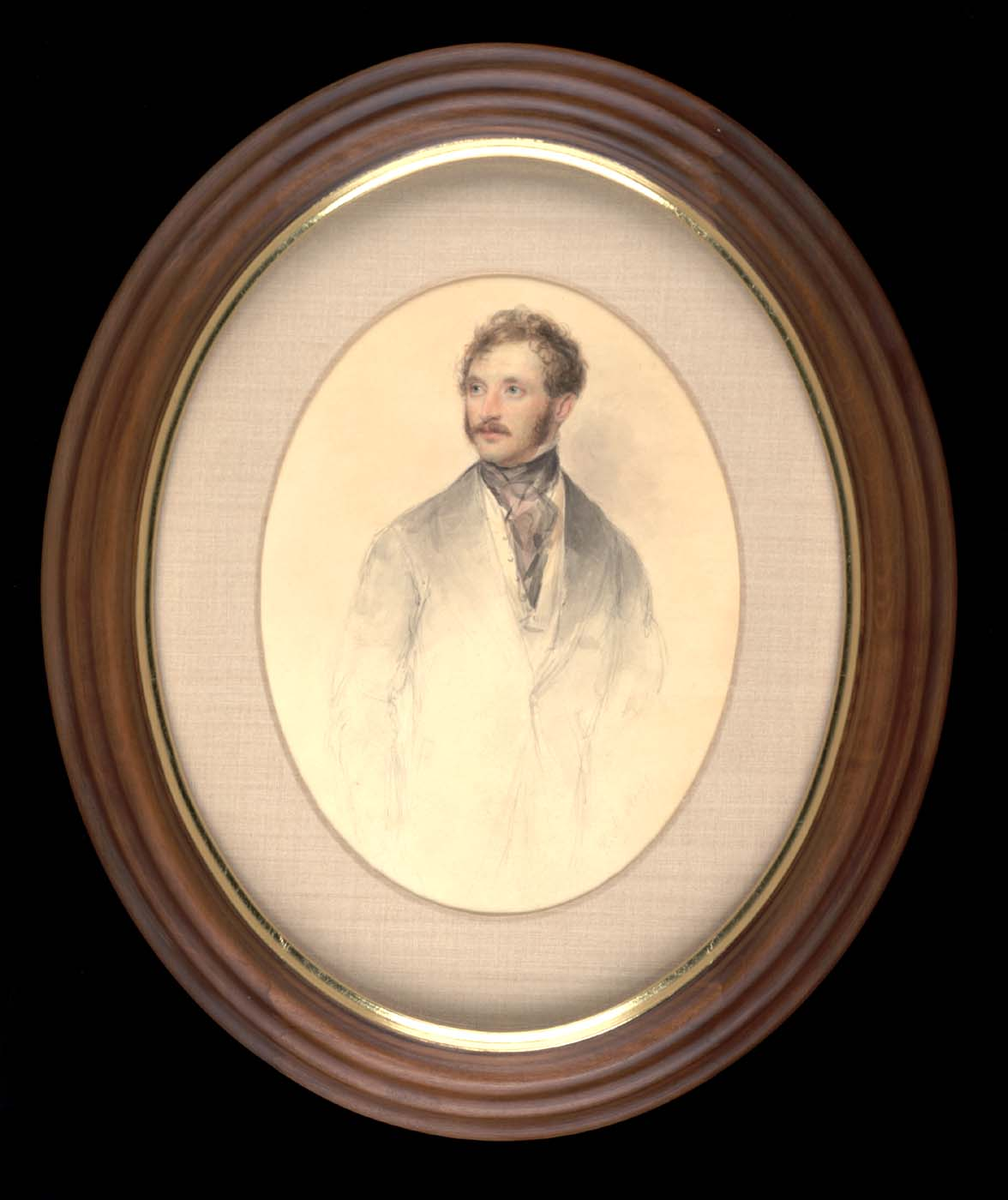
