= List of Republicans who opposed the Donald Trump 2020 presidential campaign =

This is a list of Republicans and conservatives who opposed the re-election of incumbent Donald Trump, the 2020 Republican Party nominee for President of the United States. Among them are former Republicans who left the party in 2016 or later due to their opposition to Trump, those who held office as a Republican, Republicans who endorsed a different candidate, and Republican presidential primary election candidates that announced opposition to Trump as the presumptive nominee. Over 70 former senior Republican national security officials and 61 additional senior officials have also signed onto a statement declaring, "We are profoundly concerned about our nation's security and standing in the world under the leadership of Donald Trump. The President has demonstrated that he is dangerously unfit to serve another term."

A group of former senior U.S. government officials and conservatives—including from the Reagan, Bush 41, Bush 43, and Trump administrations formed The Republican Political Alliance for Integrity and Reform (REPAIR) to, "focus on a return to principles-based governing in the post-Trump era." A third group of Republicans, Republican Voters Against Trump was launched in May 2020 collected over 500 testimonials opposing Trump.

== Former Executive Branch officials ==
=== U.S. President ===
George W. Bush

- George W. Bush, 43rd President of the United States (2001–2009), Governor of Texas (1995–2000) (wrote-in Condoleezza Rice)

=== Cabinet-level officials ===
- Peter Allgeier, U.S. Trade Representative (2005, 2009) (endorsed Joe Biden)
- William Cohen, U.S. Secretary of Defense (1997–2001), Chair of the Senate Aging Committee (1995–1997), Chair of the Senate Indian Affairs Committee (1981–1983), U.S. Senator from Maine (1979–1997), U.S. Representative from ME-02 (1973–1979) (endorsed Joe Biden)
- Stuart M. Gerson, U.S. Attorney General (1993), Assistant Attorney General for the Civil Division (1989–1993) (endorsed Joe Biden)
- Carlos Gutierrez, U.S. Secretary of Commerce (2005–2009) (endorsed Joe Biden)
- Chuck Hagel, U.S. Secretary of Defense (2013–2015), Chair of the President's Intelligence Advisory Board (2009–2013), U.S. Senator from Nebraska (1997–2009) (endorsed Joe Biden)
- Michael Hayden Director of the National Security Agency (NSA) (1999–2005), Principal Deputy Director of National Intelligence (2005–2006), Director of the Central Intelligence Agency (2006–2009), 4 star general (April 22, 2005) (endorsed Joe Biden)
- Carla Hills, U.S. Trade Representative (1989–1993), U.S. Secretary of Housing and Urban Development (1975–1977) (endorsed Joe Biden)
- Peter Keisler, U.S. Attorney General (2007), Assistant Attorney General for the Civil Division (2003–2007), Acting Associate Attorney General (2002–2003) (endorsed Joe Biden)
- Ray LaHood, U.S. Secretary of Transportation (2009–2013), U.S. Representative from IL-18 (1995–2009) (endorsed Joe Biden)
- James Mattis, Secretary of Defense (2017–2019)
- Bob McDonald, U.S. Secretary of Veterans Affairs (2014–2017) (endorsed Joe Biden)
- John Negroponte, U.S. Deputy Secretary of State (2007–2009), Director of National Intelligence (2005–2007), U.S. Ambassador to Iraq (2004–2005), U.S. Ambassador to the United Nations (2001–2004), U.S. Ambassador to the Philippines (1993–1996), U.S. Ambassador to Mexico (1989–1993), Deputy National Security Advisor (1987–1989), Assistant Secretary of State for Oceans and International Environmental and Scientific Affairs (1985–1987), U.S. Ambassador to Honduras (1981–1985) (endorsed Joe Biden)
- Mary Peters, U.S. Secretary of Transportation (2006–2009) (endorsed Joe Biden)

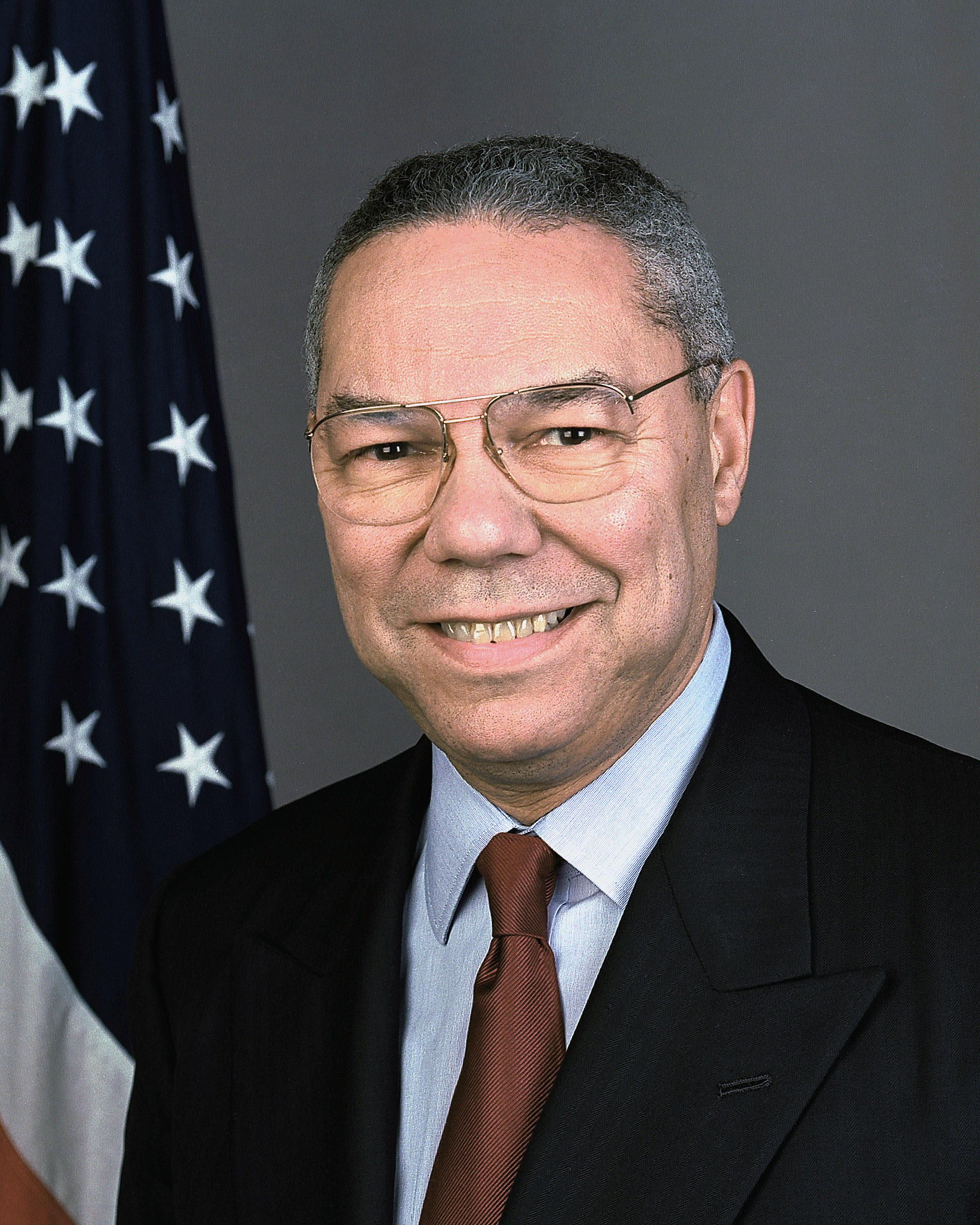
Colin Powell

- Colin Powell, U.S. Secretary of State (2001–2005), Chairman of the Joint Chiefs of Staff (1989–1993), National Security Advisor (1987–1989) (later Independent, endorsed Joe Biden)
- William Reilly, Administrator of the Environmental Protection Agency (1989–1993) (endorsed Joe Biden)
- Tom Ridge, U.S. Secretary of Homeland Security (2003–2005), Governor of Pennsylvania (1995–2001), U.S. Representative from PA-21 (1983–1995) (endorsed Joe Biden)
- Thomas A. Shannon Jr., U.S. Secretary of State (2017) (endorsed Joe Biden)
- Ann Veneman, executive director of UNICEF (2005–2010), U.S. Secretary of Agriculture (2001–2005) (endorsed Joe Biden)
- William H. Webster, Chair of the Homeland Security Advisory Council (2005–2020), Director of Central Intelligence (1987–1991), Director of the Federal Bureau of Investigation (1978–1987), Judge of the U.S. Court of Appeals for the Eighth Circuit (1973–1978), Judge of the U.S. District Court for the Eastern District of Missouri (1970–1973), U.S. Attorney for the Eastern District of Missouri (1960–1961) (endorsed Joe Biden)
- Christine Todd Whitman, Administrator of the Environmental Protection Agency (2001–2003), Governor of New Jersey (1994–2001) (endorsed Joe Biden)
- Robert Zoellick, U.S. Trade Representative (2001–2005) (endorsed Joe Biden)

=== Defense Department officials ===
- Chuck Boyd, 4-star General United States Air Force (1959–1995) (endorsed Joe Biden)
- Torie Clark, Assistant Secretary of Defense for Public Affairs (2001–2003) (endorsed Joe Biden)
- Michael Donley, U.S. Secretary of the Air Force (2008–2013) (endorsed Joe Biden)
- Raymond DuBois, Acting Under Secretary of the Army (2005–2006) (endorsed Joe Biden)
- William McRaven, Admiral, Commander of U.S. Special Operations Command (2011–2014) (endorsed Joe Biden)
- Sean O'Keefe, Administrator of the National Aeronautics and Space Administration (2001–2004), U.S. Secretary of the Navy (1992–1993) (endorsed Joe Biden)
- Richard V. Spencer, U.S. Secretary of the Navy (2017–2019) (endorsed Michael Bloomberg)
- William Howard Taft IV, U.S. Ambassador to NATO (1989–1992), U.S. Deputy Secretary of Defense (1984–1989) (endorsed Joe Biden)
- Michael Vickers, Under Secretary of Defense for Intelligence (2011–2015) (endorsed Joe Biden)
- Matthew Waxman, Deputy Assistant Secretary of Defense for Detainee Affairs (2004–2005) (endorsed Joe Biden)
- Dov Zakheim, Under Secretary of Defense (Comptroller) (2001–2004) (endorsed Joe Biden)

=== Homeland Security Department officials ===
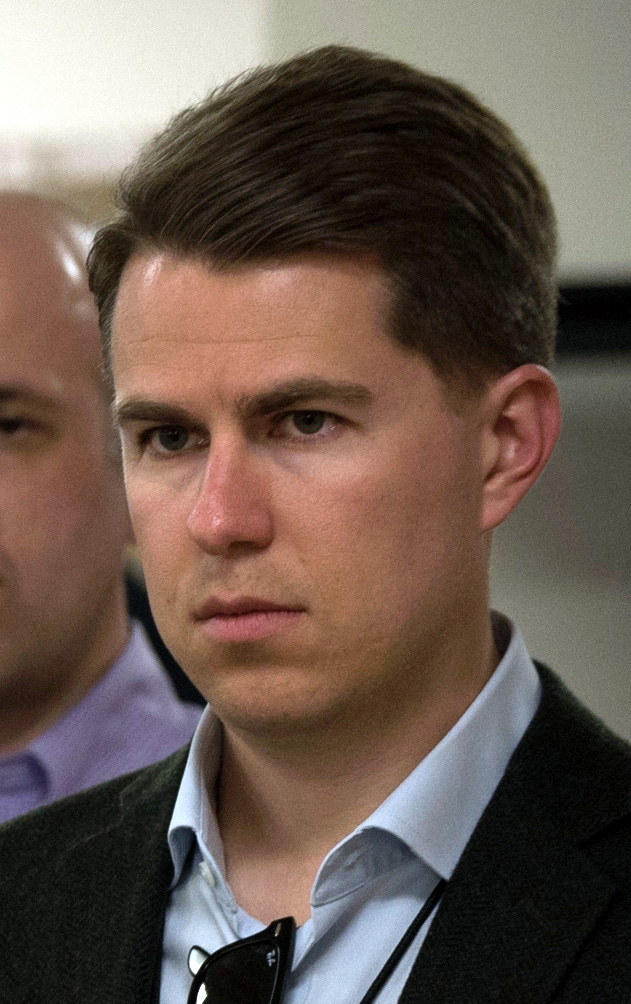
Miles Taylor

- Kenneth Adelman Fmr Director, Arms Control and Disarmament Agency (1983–1987) (endorsed Joe Biden)
- Parney Albright, Assistant Secretary of Homeland Security for Science and Technology (2003–2005) (endorsed Joe Biden)
- Michael D. Brown, Administrator of the Federal Emergency Management Agency (2003–2005) (endorsed Joe Biden)
- James Loy, U.S. Deputy Secretary of Homeland Security (2003–2005), Administrator of the Transportation Security Administration (2002–2003), Commandant of the Coast Guard (1998–2002) (endorsed Joe Biden)
- John Mitnick, General Counsel of the Department of Homeland Security (2018–2019) (endorsed Joe Biden)
- Elizabeth Neumann, Deputy Chief of Staff of the Department of Homeland Security (2016–2020) (endorsed Joe Biden)
- Miles Taylor, Chief of Staff of the Department of Homeland Security (2017–2019), author known as "Anonymous" (endorsed Joe Biden)

=== Intelligence Community officials ===
- Jon D. Glassman National Security Advisor to the Vice President, U.S. Ambassador to Afghanistan (1983–86), United States Ambassador to Paraguay (1991–94) (endorsed Joe Biden)
- Michael Leiter, Director of the National Counterterrorism Center (2007–11) (endorsed Joe Biden)

=== Justice Department officials ===
- A. Brian Albritton, Middle District of Florida (2008–10)
- Donald B. Ayer, U.S. Deputy Attorney General (1989–90), U.S. Attorney for the Eastern District of California (1981–86)
- Daniel Bogden, U.S. Attorney for the District of Nevada (2009–17, 2001–06) (endorsed Joe Biden)
- Greg Brower, U.S. Attorney for the District of Nevada (2008–09), member of Nevada Senate (2011–16) (endorsed Joe Biden)
- Wayne Budd, District of Massachusetts (1989–92) (endorsed Joe Biden)
- Paul Charlton, U.S. Attorney for the District of Arizona (2001–06) (endorsed Joe Biden)
- James Comey, Director of the Federal Bureau of Investigation (2013–17), U.S. Deputy Attorney General (2003–05) (Independent since 2016, endorsed Joe Biden)
- Charles Fried, U.S. Solicitor General (1985–89) (endorsed Joe Biden)
- Jonathan L. Goldstein, U.S. Attorney for the District of New Jersey (1974–77) (endorsed Joe Biden)
- Thomas Heffelfinger, U.S. Attorney for the District of Minnesota (1991–93), (2001–06) (endorsed Joe Biden)
- David C. Iglesias, U.S. Attorney for the District of New Mexico (2001–06) (endorsed Joe Biden)
- Marcos Jimenez, U.S. Attorney for the Southern District of Florida (2002–05) (endorsed Joe Biden)
- David Kelley, U.S. Attorney for the Southern District of New York (2003–05) (endorsed Joe Biden)
- John McKay, U.S. Attorney for the Western District of Washington (2001–06) (endorsed Joe Biden)
- Jan Paul Miller, U.S. Attorney for the Central District of Illinois (2002–05) (endorsed Joe Biden)
- Matthew Orwig, U.S. Attorney for the Eastern District of Texas (2001–07) (endorsed Joe Biden)
- Paul Perez, U.S. Attorney for the Middle District of Florida (2002–07) (endorsed Joe Biden)
- Stanley Twardy, U.S. Attorney for the District of Connecticut (1985–91) (endorsed Joe Biden)
- Ken Wainstein, U.S. Attorney for the District of Columbia (2004–06) (endorsed Joe Biden)
- William H. Webster, Director of the Federal Bureau of Investigation (1978–87), U.S. Attorney for the Eastern District of Missouri (1960–61) (endorsed Joe Biden)

=== State Department officials ===
- Richard Armitage, U.S. Deputy Secretary of State (2001–05) (endorsed Joe Biden)
- John B. Bellinger III, Legal Adviser of the Department of State (2005–09) (endorsed Joe Biden)
- Robert Blackwill, U.S. Ambassador to India (2001–03) (endorsed Joe Biden)
- Richard Boucher, Assistant Secretary of State for South and Central Asian Affairs (2006–2009) (endorsed Joe Biden)
- Charles R. Bowers, U.S. Ambassador to Bolivia (1991–1994) (endorsed Joe Biden)
- Peter Bridges, U.S. Ambassador to Somalia (1984–1986) (endorsed Joe Biden)
- Richard Burt, U.S. Ambassador to Germany (1985–89) (endorsed Joe Biden)
- Jack Chow, former Special Representative of the U.S. Secretary of State on Global HIV/AIDS (endorsed Joe Biden)
- Eliot A. Cohen, Counselor of the Department of State (2007–09) (endorsed Joe Biden)
- Chester Crocker, Assistant Secretary of State for African Affairs (1981–89) (endorsed Joe Biden)
- Sada Cumber, Special Envoy to the Organisation of Islamic Cooperation (2008–09) (endorsed Joe Biden)
- Eric S. Edelman, Under Secretary of Defense for Policy (2005–09), U.S. Ambassador to Turkey (2003–05), U.S. Ambassador to Finland (1998–2001) (endorsed Joe Biden)
- Julie Finley, U.S. Ambassador to the Organization for Security and Cooperation in Europe (2005–2009) (endorsed Joe Biden)
- Carl W. Ford Jr., Assistant Secretary of State for Intelligence and Research (2001–2003) (endorsed Joe Biden)
- James Glassman, Under Secretary of State for Public Diplomacy (2008–09) (endorsed Joe Biden)
- Colleen Graffy, Deputy Assistant Secretary of State for Public Diplomacy in Europe and Eurasia (2004–09) (endorsed Joe Biden)
- Gordon Gray III, U.S. Ambassador to Tunisia (2009–12) (endorsed Joe Biden)
- Richard Kauzlarich Fmr Dep Asst Secretary of State (1984–86) United States Ambassador to Bosnia and Herzegovina (August 1, 1997 – August 20, 1999)(endorsed Joe Biden)
- James Kelly, Assistant Secretary of State for East Asian and Pacific Affairs (2001–05) (endorsed Joe Biden)
- David Kramer, Assistant Secretary of State for Democracy, Human Rights, and Labor (2008–09) (endorsed Joe Biden)
- Stephen Krasner, Director of Policy Planning (2005–07) (endorsed Joe Biden)
- Frank Lavin, U.S. Ambassador to Singapore (2001–05) (endorsed Joe Biden)
- Winston Lord, U.S. Ambassador to China (1984–1989) (endorsed Joe Biden)
- Brett McGurk, Special Presidential Envoy for the Global Coalition to Counter the Islamic State of Iraq and the Levant (2015–18)
- Alberto J. Mora, general counsel to the U.S. Information Agency (1989–1993) (endorsed Joe Biden)
- Douglas H. Paal, former member of the U.S. State Department Policy Planning Staff (endorsed Joe Biden)
- Kori Schake, Deputy Director of Policy Planning (2007–08) (endorsed Joe Biden)
- Gregory Schulte, U.S. Ambassador to the International Atomic Energy Agency (2005–2009) (endorsed Joe Biden)
- Mark C. Storella, U.S. Ambassador to Zambia (2010–2013) (endorsed Joe Biden)
- Shirin R. Tahir-Kheli, Alternate United States Representative to the United Nations for Special Political Affairs (1990–1993) (endorsed Joe Biden)
- Robert Tuttle, U.S. Ambassador to the United Kingdom (2005–09) (endorsed Joe Biden)
- John Wolf, Assistant Secretary of State for International Organization Affairs (1989–1992), Ambassador to Malaysia (1992–1995) (endorsed Joe Biden)
- Philip Zelikow, Counselor of the Department of State (2005–07) (endorsed Joe Biden)

=== Treasury Department officials ===
- Jimmy Gurulé, Under Secretary of the Treasury for Terrorism and Financial Intelligence (2001–03) (endorsed Joe Biden)
- Rosario Marin, Treasurer of the United States (2001–03) (endorsed Joe Biden)

=== White House officials ===
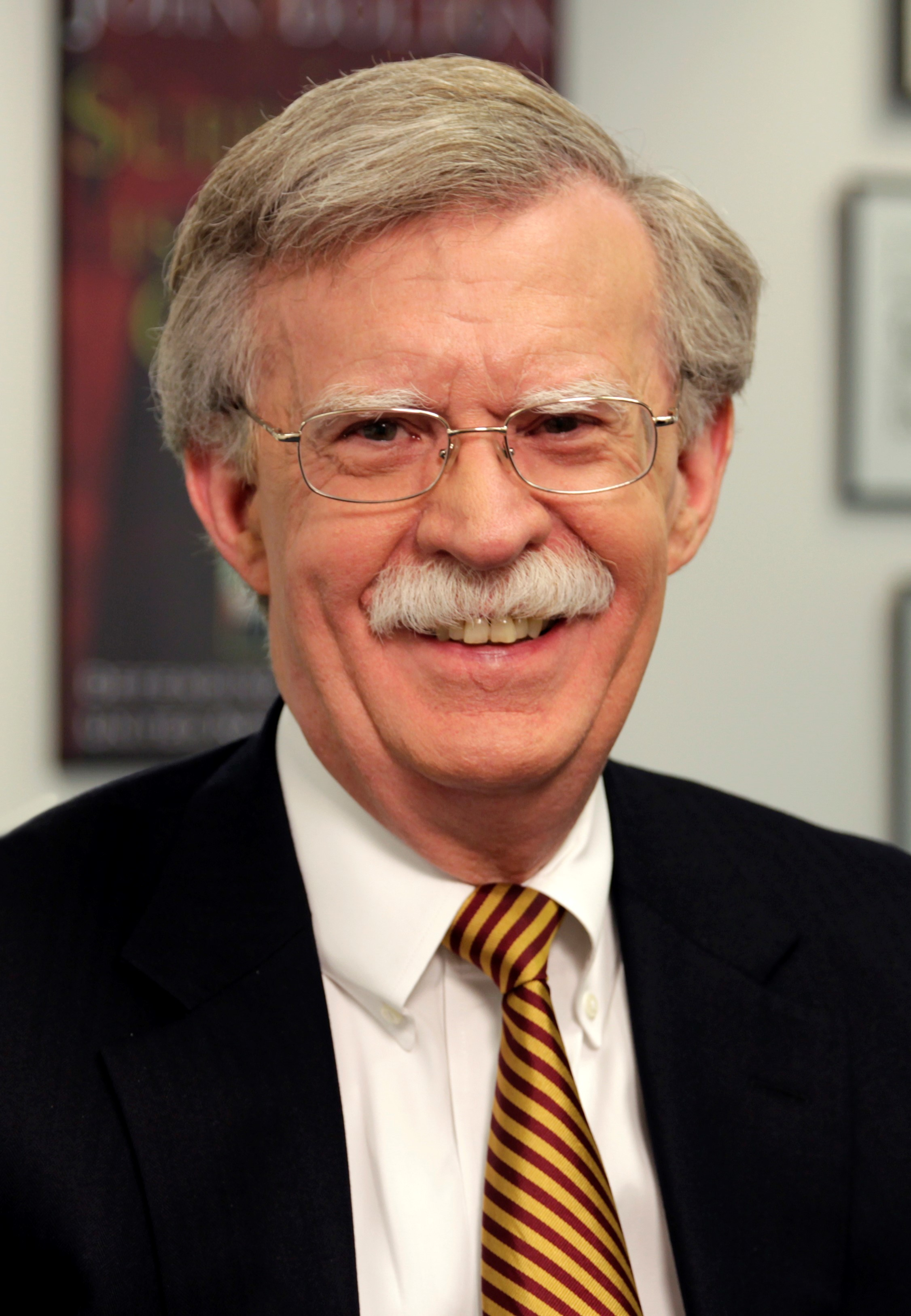
John Bolton

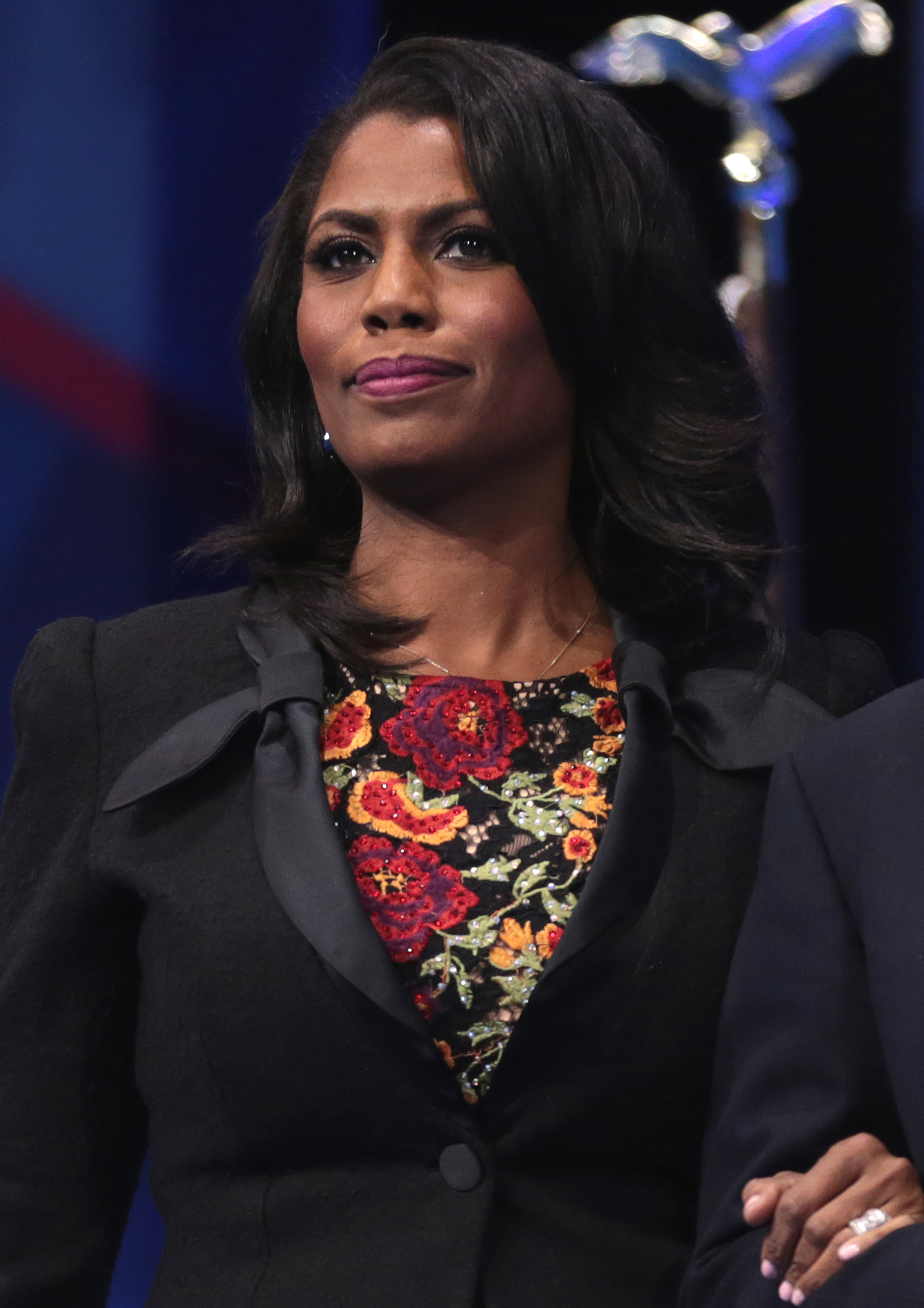
Omarosa

- Steve Abbot, Deputy Homeland Security Advisor (2001–03) (endorsed Joe Biden)
- Bruce Bartlett, author, historian, domestic policy advisor to Ronald Reagan (former Republican, now Independent; previously endorsed Elizabeth Warren, then Joe Biden)
- Kenneth Bernard, Special Assistant to the President for Biodefense and Assistant Surgeon General (2002–05) (endorsed Joe Biden)
- John Bolton, National Security Advisor (2018–19), U.S. Ambassador to the United Nations (2005–06)
- Victor Cha, Director for Asian Affairs of the National Security Council (2004–07) (endorsed Joe Biden)
- Gary Edson, Deputy National Security Advisor for International Economic Affairs (2001–04) (endorsed Joe Biden)
- Richard Falkenrath, Deputy Homeland Security Advisor (2003–04) (endorsed Joe Biden)
- Aaron Friedberg, Director of Policy Planning and National Security Affairs to the Vice President (2003–05) (endorsed Joe Biden)
- Stephen Harmelin, White House Aide (1964-1965) (endorsed Joe Biden)
- Bill Kristol, Chief of Staff to the Vice President (1989–93), founder of The Weekly Standard, editor of The Bulwark (endorsed Joe Biden)
- Omarosa Manigault Newman, Communications Director of the Office of Public Liaison (2017–18), reality television star (Independent since 2019, endorsed Joe Biden)
- Peggy Noonan, Special Assistant to the President (1984–86), columnist for The Wall Street Journal.
- Anthony Scaramucci, White House Communications Director (2017) (endorsed Joe Biden)
- Stephen Slick, Senior Director for Intelligence Programs and Reform of the National Security Council (2005–09) (endorsed Joe Biden)
- Shirin Tahir-Kheli, Senior Director for Democracy, Human Rights and International Operations of the National Security Council (2003–05) (endorsed Joe Biden)
- Olivia Troye, Homeland Security and Counterterrorism Advisor to Vice President Pence (2018–) and aide to the White House Coronavirus Task Force (endorsed Joe Biden)
- Ken Wainstein, Homeland Security Advisor (2008–09) (endorsed Joe Biden)

=== Other executive officials ===
- Linton Brooks, Administrator of the National Nuclear Security Administration and Under Secretary of Energy for Nuclear Security (2003–07) (endorsed Joe Biden)
- Josh Venable, U.S. Department of Education Chief of Staff for Betsy Devos (2016–18) chief of staff for the Michigan Republican Party (endorsed Joe Biden)

== U.S. senators ==
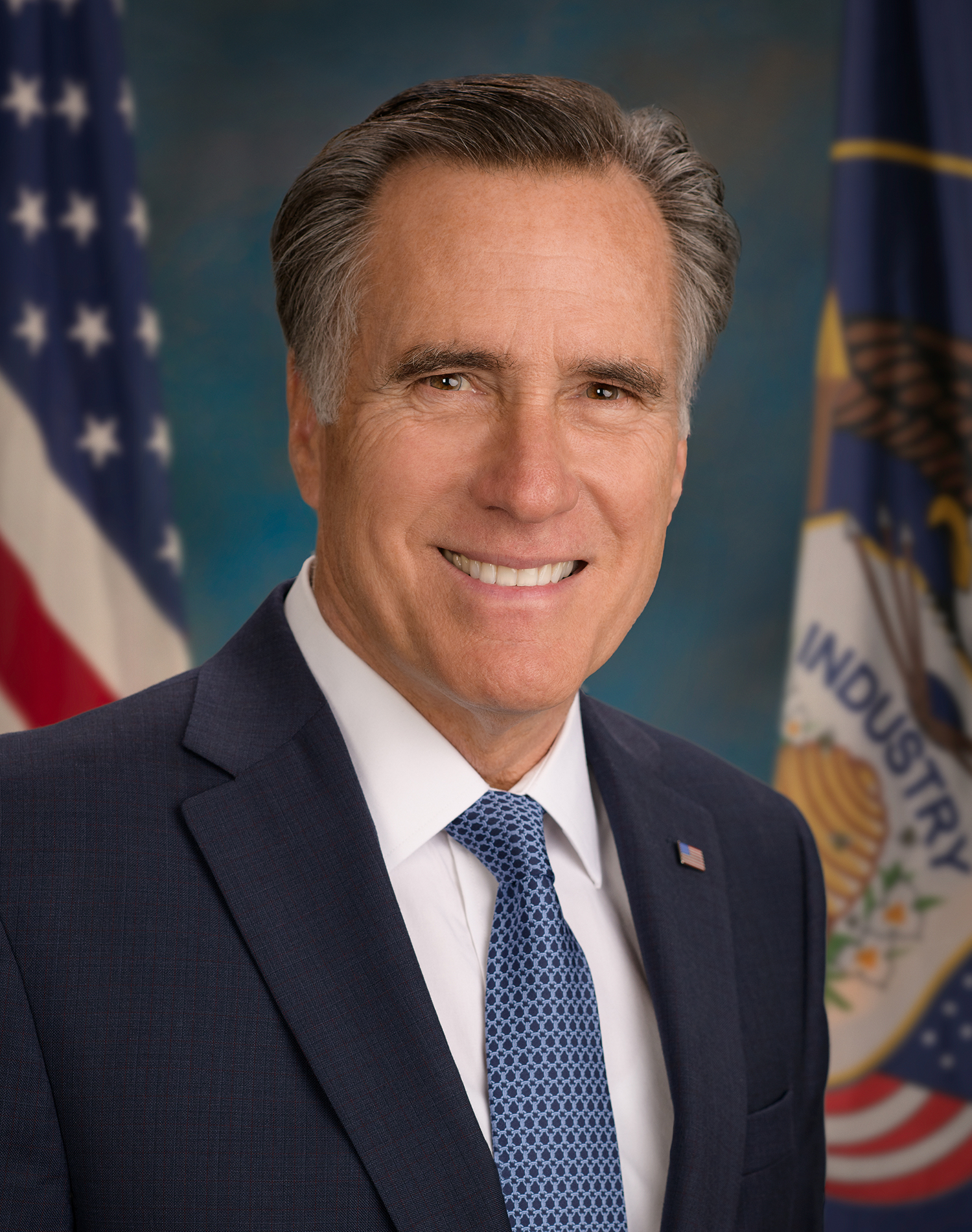
Mitt Romney

=== Current ===
- Lisa Murkowski, U.S. Senator from Alaska (2002–present), Member of the Alaska House of Representatives from the 14th district (1999–2002)
- Mitt Romney, U.S. Senator from Utah (2019–2025), 2012 nominee for President, Chair of the Republican Governors Association (2005–06), Governor of Massachusetts (2003–07)
- Ben Sasse, U.S. Senator from Nebraska (2015–2023) (wrote-in Mike Pence)

=== Former ===
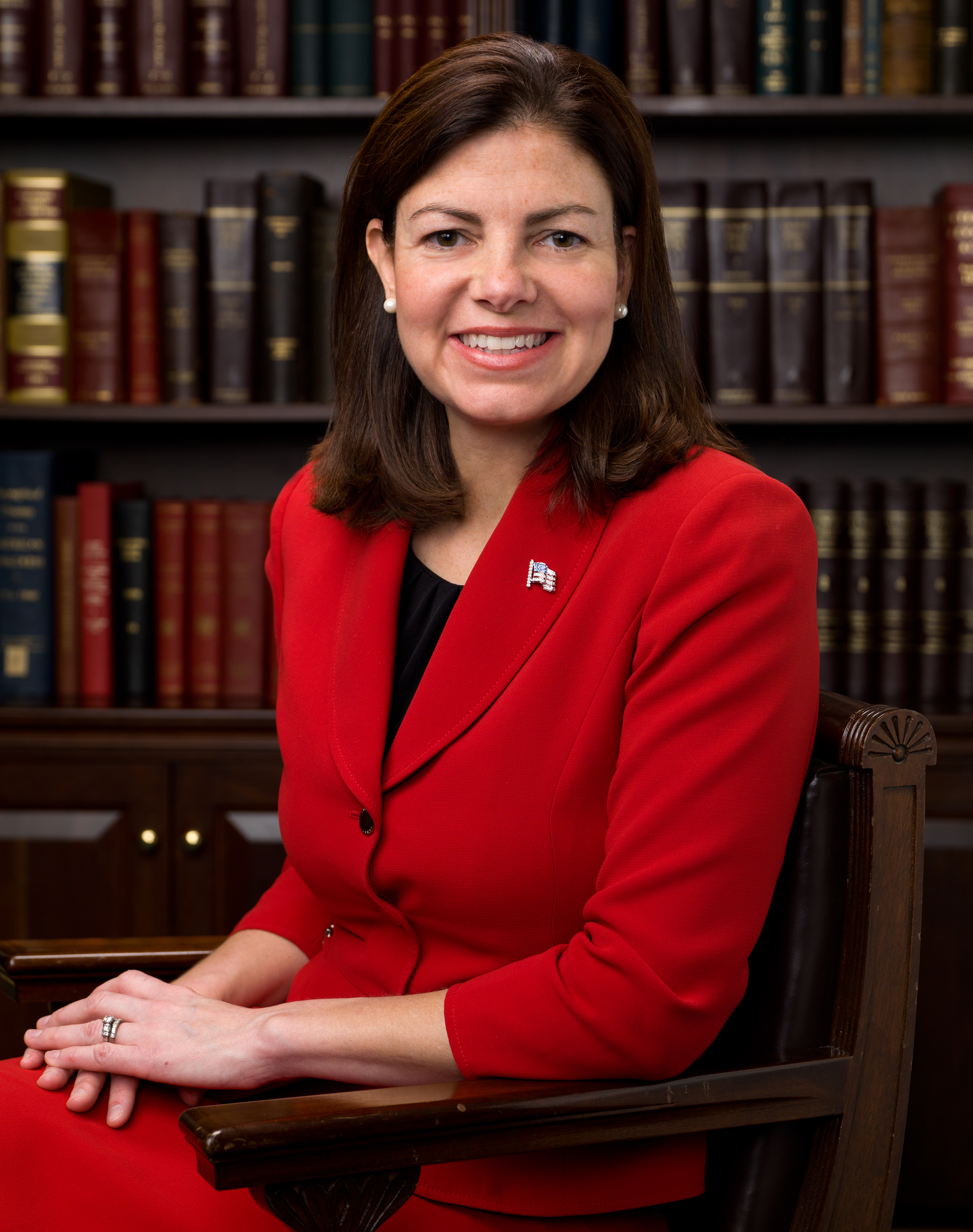
Kelly Ayotte

- Kelly Ayotte, U.S. Senator from New Hampshire (2011–2017)
- Lincoln Chafee, Governor of Rhode Island (2011–15), U.S. Senator from Rhode Island (1999–2007) (Libertarian since 2019)
- John Danforth, U.S. Senator from Missouri (1976–1995)
- David Durenberger, Chair of the Senate Intelligence Committee (1985–87), U.S. Senator from Minnesota (1978–95) (Independent since 2005, endorsed Joe Biden)
- Daniel Evans, U.S. Senator from Washington (1983–1989), Governor of Washington (1965–1977)
- Jeff Flake, U.S. Senator from Arizona (2013–19), U.S. Representative from AZ-06 (2003–13) and AZ-01 (2001–03) (endorsed Joe Biden)
- Slade Gorton, U.S. Senator from Washington (1981–1987, 1989–2001) (died in August 2020)
- Judd Gregg, U.S. Senator from New Hampshire (1993–2011)
- Gordon Humphrey, U.S. Senator from New Hampshire (1979–90) (Independent since 2016, endorsed Joe Biden)
- Larry Pressler, U.S. Senator from South Dakota (1979–1997), U.S. Representative from SD-01 (1975–1979) (endorsed Joe Biden, Independent since 2013)
- John Warner, Chair of the Senate Armed Services Committee (2003–07), Chair of the Senate Rules Committee (1995–99), U.S. Senator from Virginia (1979–2009), U.S. Secretary of the Navy (1972–74) (endorsed Joe Biden)
- Bob Corker (2007–19), U.S. Senator from Tennessee

== U.S. representatives ==
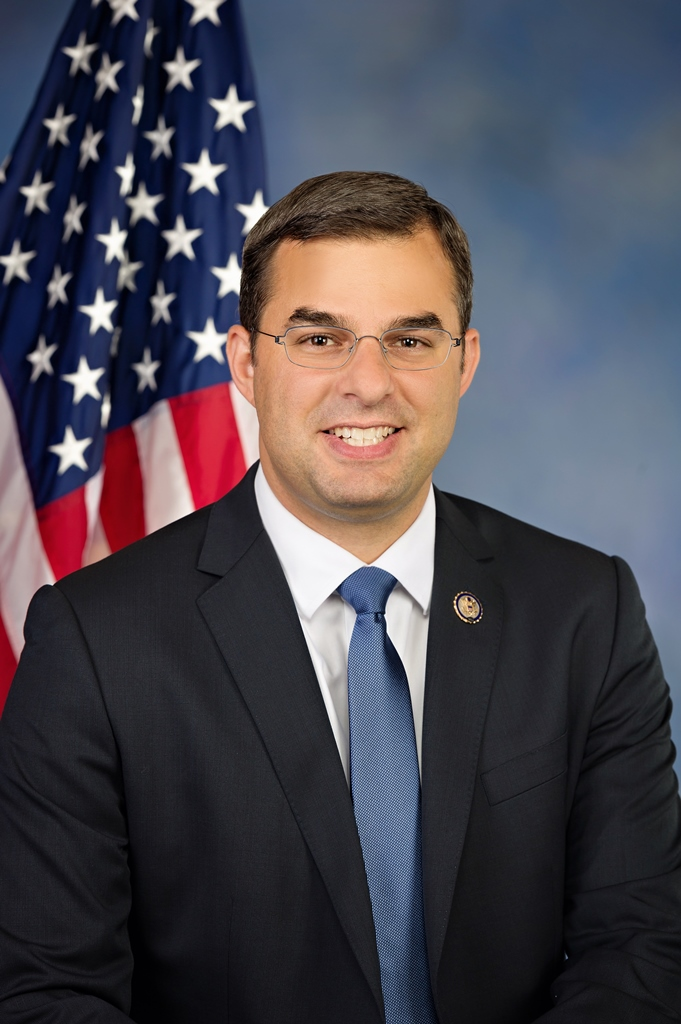
Justin Amash

=== Sitting ===
- Justin Amash, U.S. Representative from MI-03 (2011–2021) (Libertarian 2020-2024, endorsed Jo Jorgensen)
- Will Hurd, U.S. Representative from TX-23 (2015–2021)
- Denver Riggleman, (Note: Withdrew endorsement) U.S. Representative from VA-05 (2019–2021) (Independent since 2022)
- Francis Rooney, U.S. Representative from FL-19 (2017–2021)
- John Shimkus, U.S. Representative from IL-15 (2013–2021), IL-19 (2003–2013) and IL-15 (1997–2003)

=== Former ===
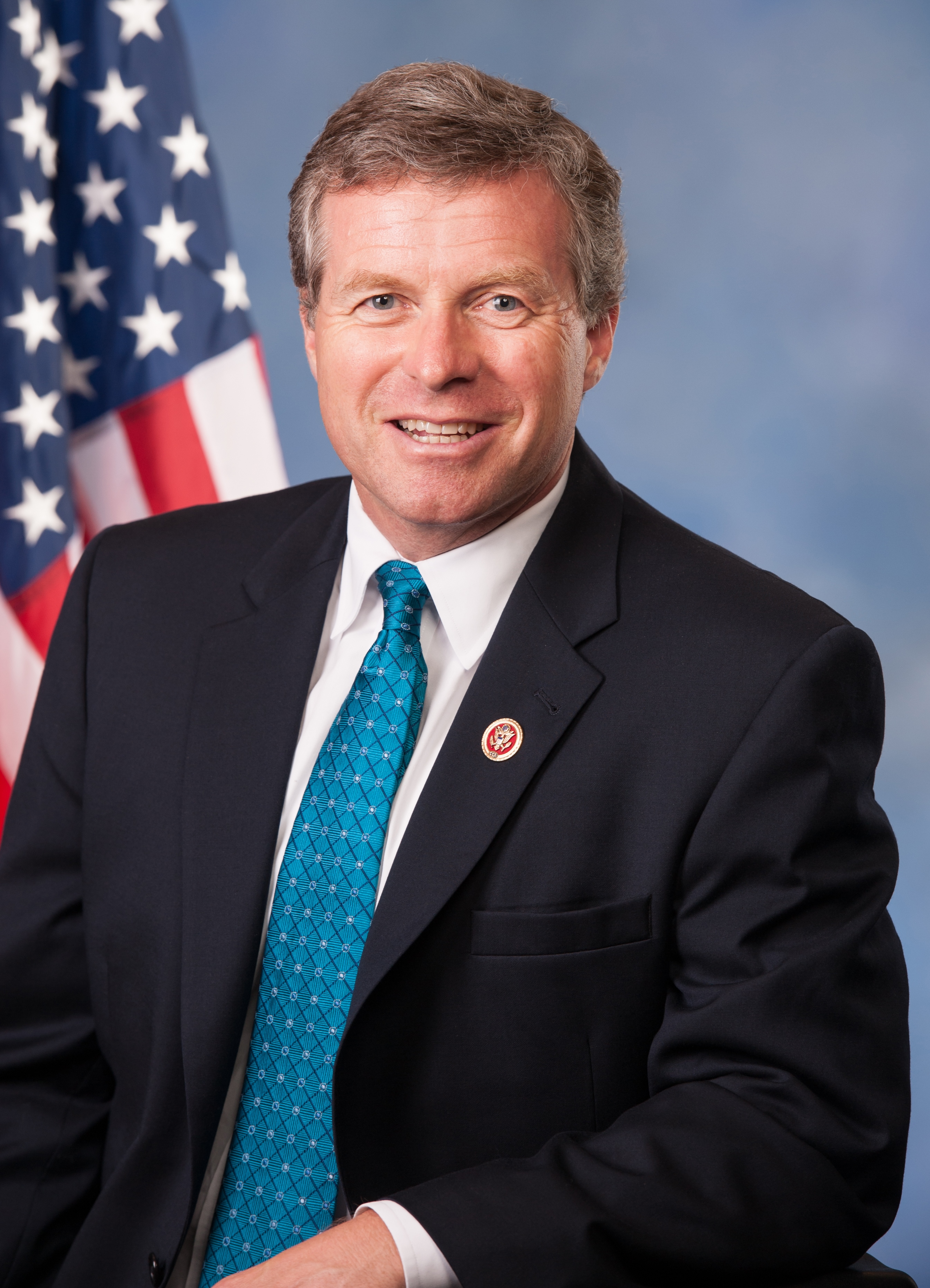
Charlie Dent

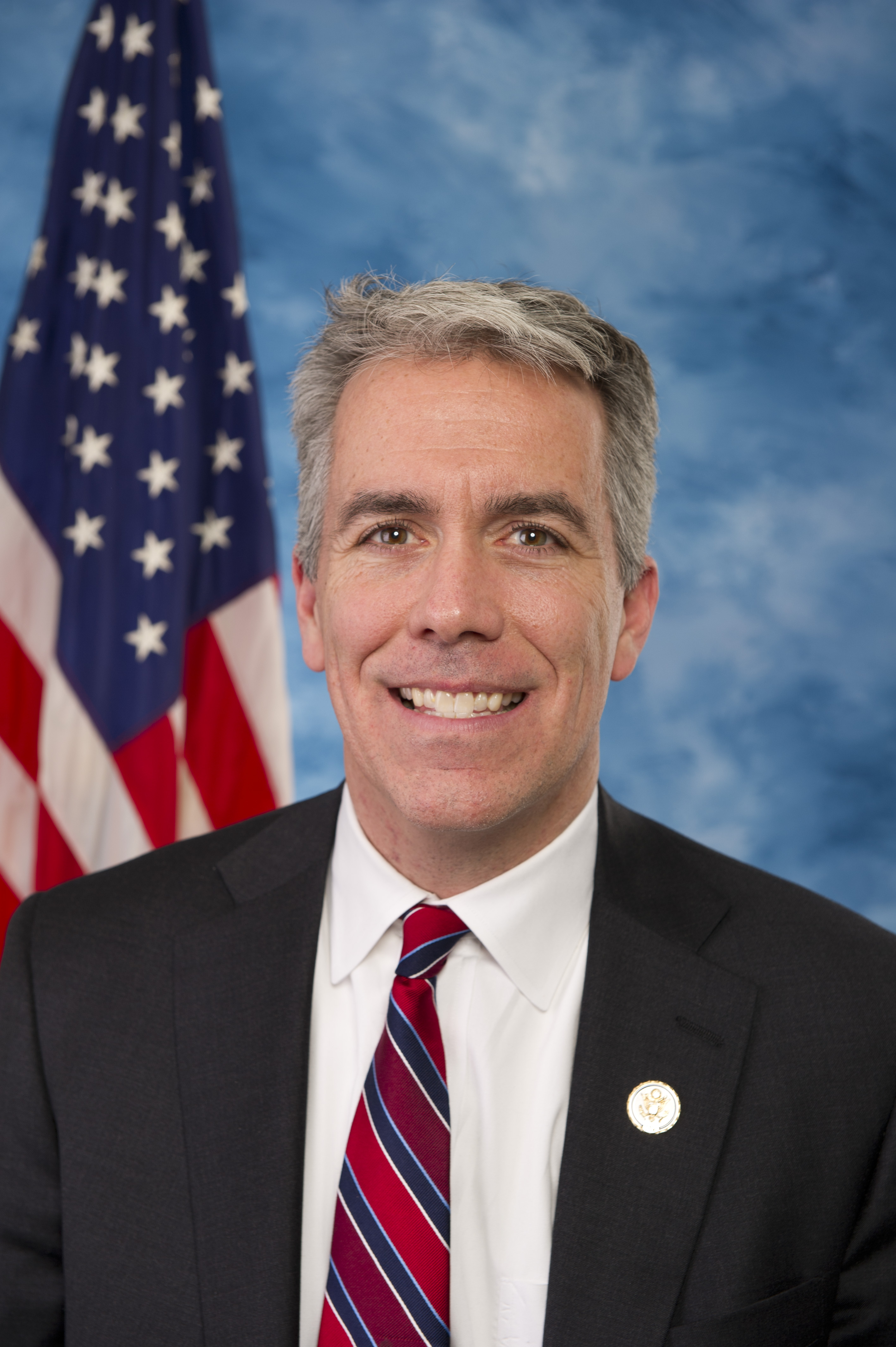
Joe Walsh

- Steve Bartlett, Mayor of Dallas, TX (1991–95), U.S. Representative from TX-03 (1983–91) (endorsed Joe Biden)
- Rod Chandler, 1992 nominee for Senate, U.S. Representative from WA-08 (1983–93) (endorsed Joe Biden)
- Bill Clinger, Chair of the House Oversight Committee (1995–97), U.S. Representative from PA-05 (1979–97) (endorsed Joe Biden)
- Tom Coleman, U.S. Representative from MO-06 (1976–93) (endorsed Joe Biden)
- Barbara Comstock, U.S. Representative from Virginia's 10th congressional district (2015–19)
- Charlie Dent, U.S. Representative from PA-15 (2005–18), Chair of the House Ethics Committee (2015–17), Co-Chair of the Tuesday Group (2007–18) (endorsed Joe Biden)
- Charles Djou, U.S. Representative from HI-01 (2010–11) (Independent since 2018) (endorsed Joe Biden)
- Chuck Douglas, U.S. Representative from NH-02 (1989–91) Associate Justice of the New Hampshire Supreme Court (1977–85, 1974–76) (endorsed Joe Biden)
- Mickey Edwards, Chair of the House Republican Policy Committee (1989–93), U.S. Representative from OK-05 (1977–93) (endorsed Joe Biden)
- David F. Emery, U.S. Representative from ME-01 (1975–83)
- Wayne Gilchrest, U.S. Representative from MD-01 (1991–2009) (Democrat since 2019, endorsed Joe Biden)
- Jim Greenwood, U.S. Representative from PA-08 (1993–2005) (endorsed Joe Biden)
- Richard L. Hanna, U.S. Representative from NY-22 (2013–17) and NY-24 (2011–13) (deceased)
- Amo Houghton, U.S. Representative from NY-29 (2003–05), NY-31 (1993–2003), and NY-34 (1987–93) (deceased)
- Bob Inglis, U.S. Representative from SC-04 (2005–11, 1993–99), 1998 nominee for Senate (endorsed Joe Biden)
- David Jolly, U.S. Representative from FL-13 (2014–17) (Independent since 2018)
- Jim Kolbe, U.S. Representative from AZ-08 (2003–07) and AZ-05 (1985–2003) (Independent since 2018, endorsed Joe Biden)
- Steven Kuykendall, U.S. Representative from CA-36 (1999–2001) (endorsed Joe Biden)
- Jim Leach, Chair of the National Endowment for the Humanities (2009–13), Chair of the House Financial Services Committee (1995–2001), U.S. Representative from IA-02 (2003–07) and IA-01 (1977–2003) (endorsed Joe Biden)
- John LeBoutillier, U.S. Representative from NY-06 (1981–83) (endorsed Joe Biden)
- Frank LoBiondo, U.S. Representative from NJ-02 (1995–2019)
- Susan Molinari, Vice Chair of the House Republican Conference (1995–97), U.S. Representative from NY-13 (1993–97) and NY-14 (1990–93) (endorsed Joe Biden)
- Connie Morella, U.S. Ambassador to the OCED (2003–07), U.S. Representative from MD-08 (1987–2003) (endorsed Joe Biden)
- Mike Parker, Assistant Secretary of the Army for Civil Works (2001–02), 1999 nominee for Governor of Mississippi, U.S. Representative from MS-04 (1989–99) (endorsed Joe Biden)
- Jack Quinn, U.S. Representative from NY-30 (1993–2005) (endorsed Joe Biden)
- Reid Ribble, U.S. Representative from WI-08 (2011–17)
- Scott Rigell, U.S. Representative from VA-02 (2011–2017)
- Ileana Ros-Lehtinen, Chair (2011–13) and Ranking Member (2007–11) of House Foreign Affairs Committee, Chair of the Congressional Hispanic Conference (2003–07), U.S. Representative from FL-27 (1989–2019)
- Claudine Schneider, 1990 nominee for Senate, U.S. Representative from RI-02 (1981–91) (endorsed Joe Biden)
- Joe Schwarz, U.S. Representative from MI-07 (2005–07) (endorsed Joe Biden)
- Chris Shays, U.S. Representative from CT-04 (1987–2009) (endorsed Joe Biden)
- Peter Smith, U.S. Representative from VT-AL (1989–91), 1986 nominee for Governor of Vermont (endorsed Joe Biden)
- Alan Steelman, 1976 nominee for Senate, U.S. Representative from TX-05 (1973–77) (endorsed Joe Biden)
- Dave Trott, U.S. Representative from MI-11 (2015–19) (endorsed Joe Biden)
- James T. Walsh, U.S. Representative from NY-25 (1993–2009) and NY-27 (1989–93) (endorsed Joe Biden)
- Joe Walsh, 2020 candidate for president, U.S. Representative from IL-08 (2011–13) (Independent since 2020, endorsed Joe Biden)
- G. William Whitehurst, U.S. Representative from VA-02 (1969–87) (endorsed Joe Biden)
- Dick Zimmer, 2008 and 1996 nominee for Senate, U.S. Representative from NJ-12 (1991–97) (endorsed Joe Biden)

== Statewide executive officials ==
=== Governors ===
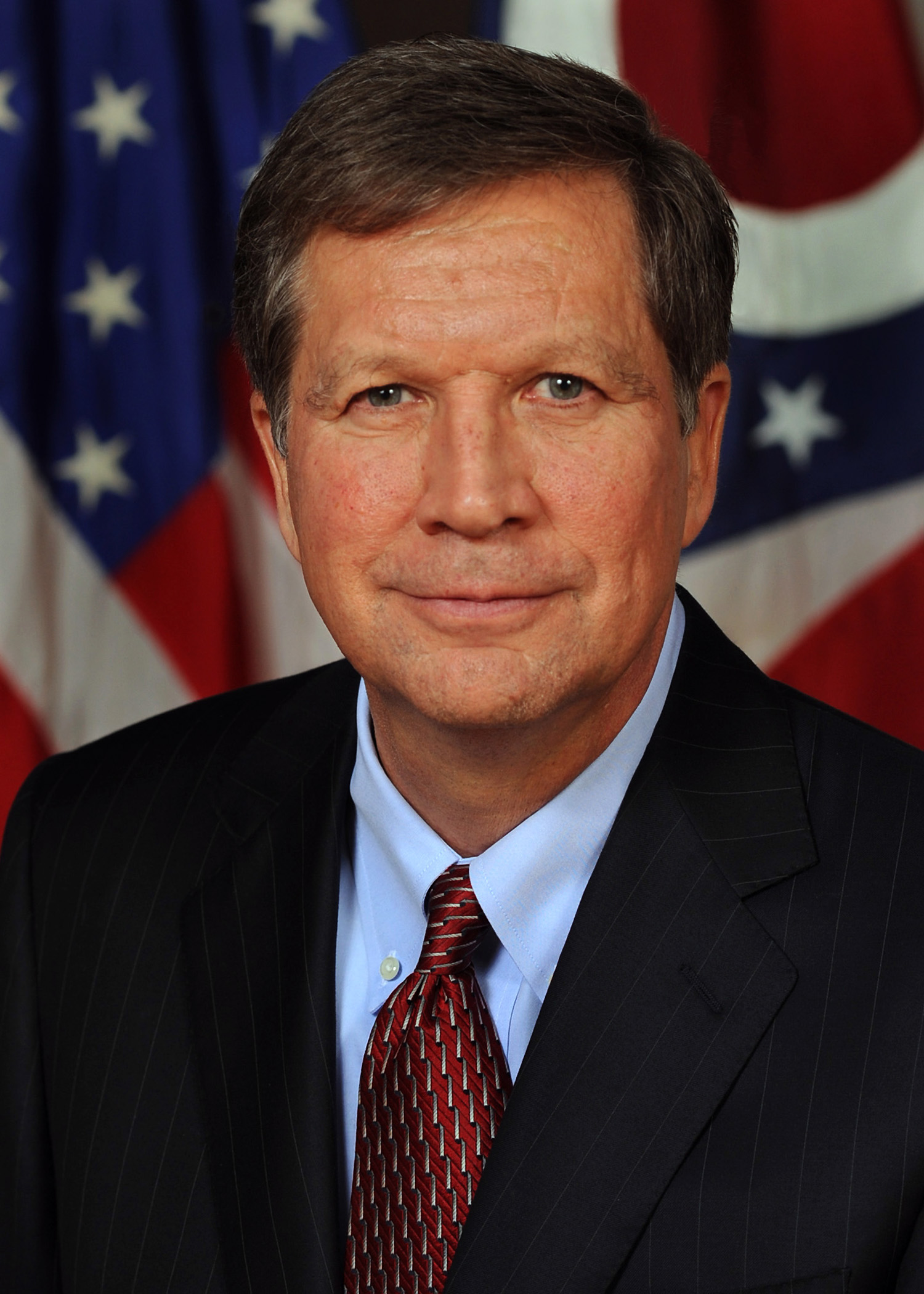
John Kasich

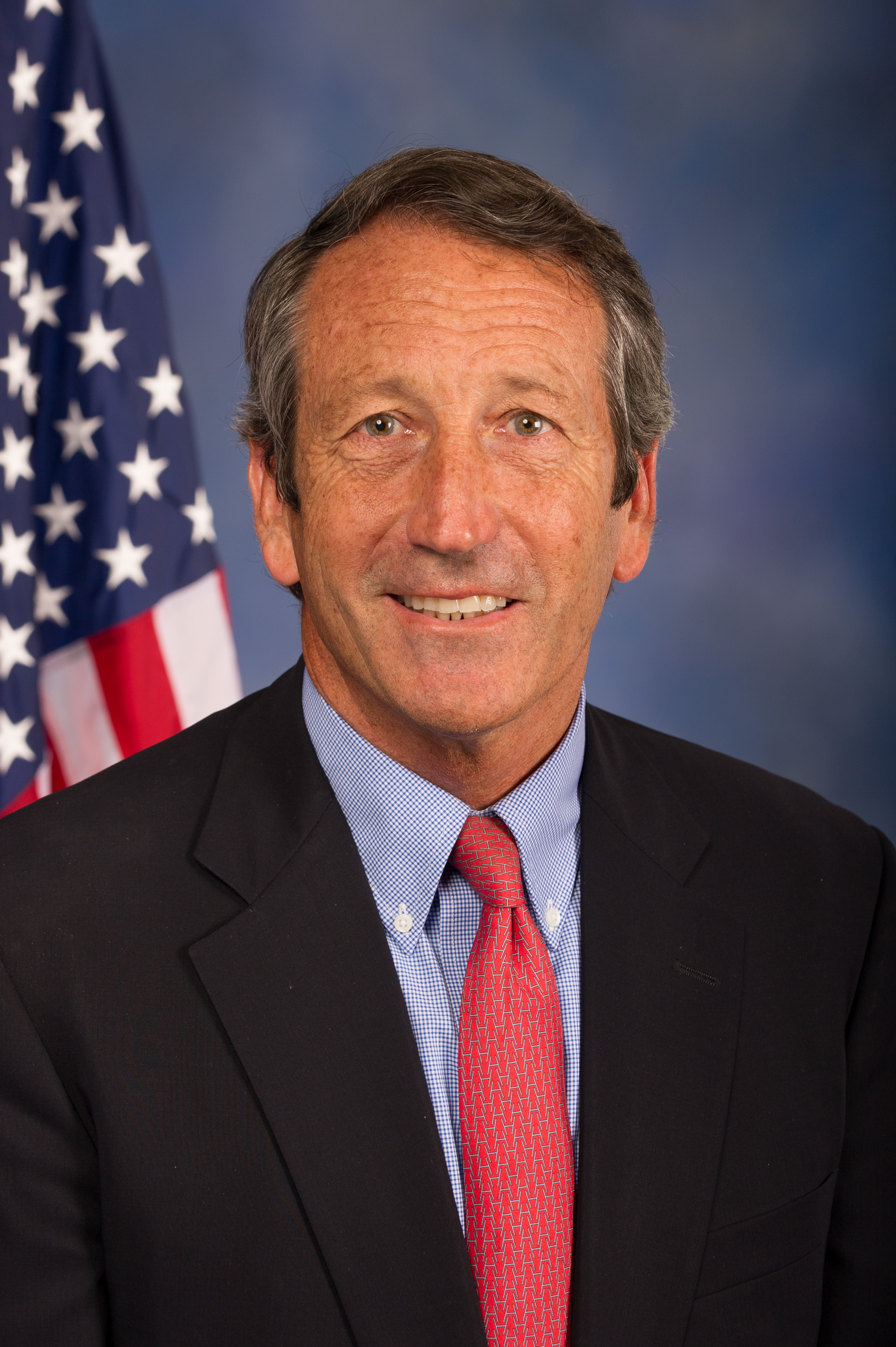
Mark Sanford

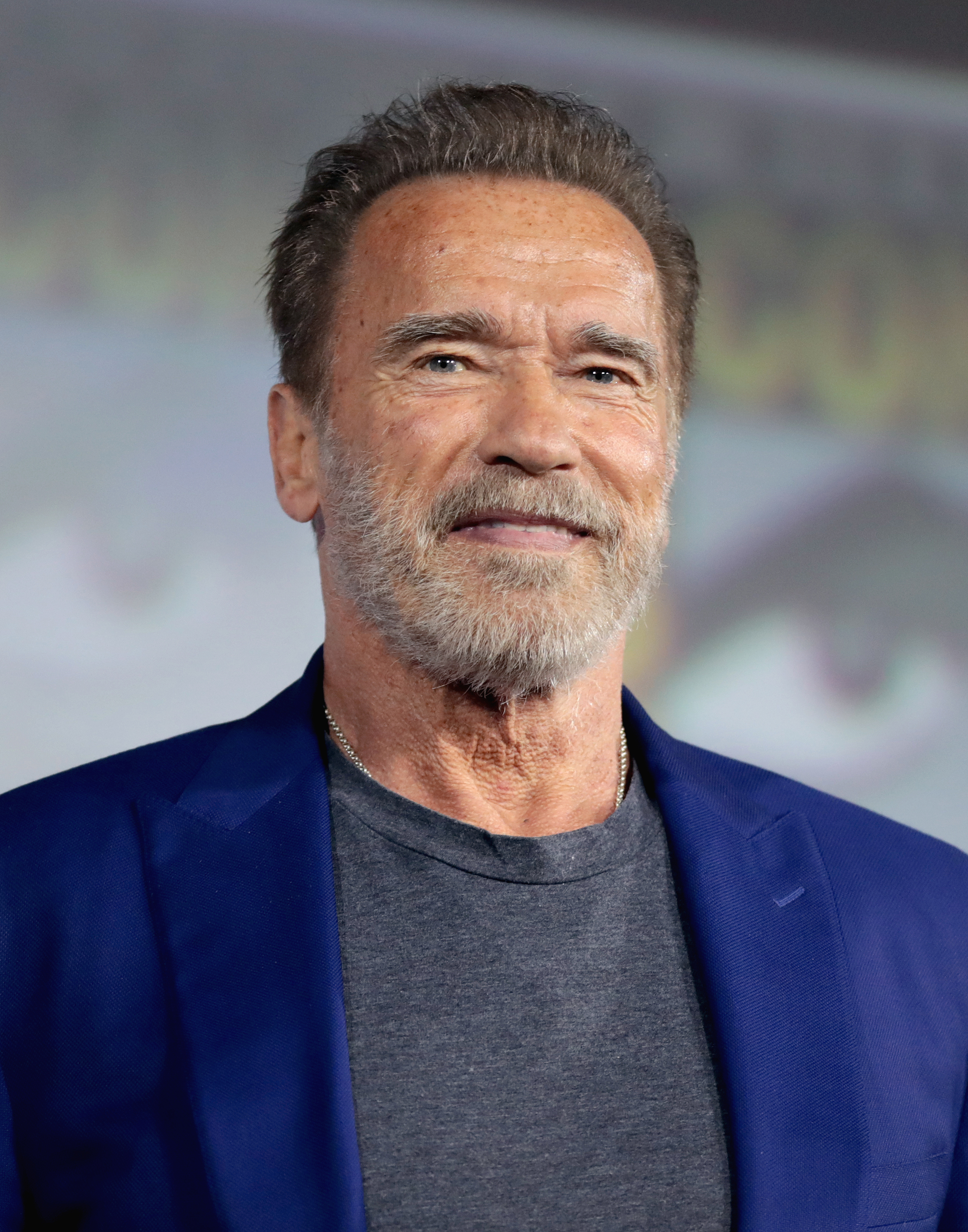
Arnold Schwarzenegger

==== Current ====
- Charlie Baker, Governor of Massachusetts (2015–2023) (blanked ballot)
- Larry Hogan, Chair of the National Governors Association (2019–20), former Governor of Maryland (2015–2023) (wrote-in Ronald Reagan)
- Phil Scott, Governor of Vermont (2017–present), Lieutenant Governor of Vermont (2011–17) (endorsed Joe Biden)

==== Former ====
- Donald Carcieri, Governor of Rhode Island (2003–2011)
- Arne Carlson, Governor of Minnesota (1991–99) (endorsed Joe Biden)
- Jim Edgar, Governor of Illinois (1991–99) (endorsed Joe Biden)
- Bill Graves, Governor of Kansas (1995–2003) (endorsed Joe Biden)
- John Kasich, 2016 candidate for president, Governor of Ohio (2011–19), Chair of the House Budget Committee (1995–2001), U.S. Representative from OH-12 (1983–2001) (endorsed Joe Biden)
- George Pataki, 2016 candidate for president, Governor of New York (1995–2006) (declined to endorse)
- Marc Racicot, Governor of Montana (1993–2001), Attorney General of Montana (1989–93), Chair of the Republican National Committee (2001–03) (endorsed Joe Biden)
- Mark Sanford, U.S. Representative from SC-01 (2013–19, 1995–2001), Chair of the Republican Governors Association (2008–09), Governor of South Carolina (2003–11)
- Arnold Schwarzenegger, actor and Governor of California (2003–11)
- Rick Snyder, Governor of Michigan (2011–19) (endorsed Joe Biden)
- Jane Swift, Governor of Massachusetts (2001–03)
- Lowell Weicker, Governor of Connecticut (1991–95), independent since 1995 (endorsed Joe Biden)
- Bill Weld, Governor of Massachusetts (1991–97), Libertarian 2016 nominee for Vice President (endorsed Joe Biden)

=== Other statewide officials ===
==== Current ====
- Karyn Polito, Lieutenant Governor of Massachusetts (2015–2023)
- Spencer Cox, (Note: Previously endorsed Trump, later stated he did not vote for Trump) Lieutenant Governor of Utah (2013–2021)

==== Former ====
- Jeff Amestoy, Chief Justice of the Vermont Supreme Court (1997–2004), Attorney General of Vermont (1985–97) (endorsed Joe Biden)
- Douglas Baily, Attorney General of Alaska (1989–90) (endorsed Joe Biden)
- Walter Cohen, Acting Attorney General of Pennsylvania (1995) (endorsed Joe Biden)
- Lisa Graham Keegan, Arizona Superintendent of Public Instruction (1995–2001) (endorsed Joe Biden)
- Richard Hodges, Director of the Ohio Department of Health (2014–17), Ohio House Representative (1993–99) (endorsed Joe Biden)
- Jim Jones, Chief Justice (2015–17) and Justice (2005–17) of the Idaho Supreme Court, Attorney General of Idaho (1983–91) (endorsed Joe Biden)
- Rob McKenna, Attorney General of Washington (2005–13)
- John Mutz, Lieutenant Governor of Indiana (1981–89), 1988 nominee for Governor of Indiana (endorsed Joe Biden)
- Jeffrey B. Pine, Attorney General of Rhode Island (1993–99) (endorsed Joe Biden)
- Thomas D. Rath, Attorney General of New Hampshire (1978–80) (endorsed Joe Biden)
- Mark Shurtleff, Attorney General of Utah (2001–13) (endorsed Joe Biden)
- Andrew Sidamon-Eristoff, Treasurer of New Jersey (2010–15) (endorsed Joe Biden)
- Gregory Smith, Attorney General of New Hampshire (1980–84) (endorsed Joe Biden)
- James C. Smith, Secretary of State of Florida (2002–03, 1987–95)Attorney General of Florida (1979–87) (endorsed Joe Biden)
- Grant Woods, Attorney General of Arizona (1991–99), (Democrat since 2018) (endorsed Joe Biden)
- Greg Zoeller, Attorney General of Indiana (2009–17) (Independent since 2016, endorsed Joe Biden)

== Former judges ==
=== Federal judges ===
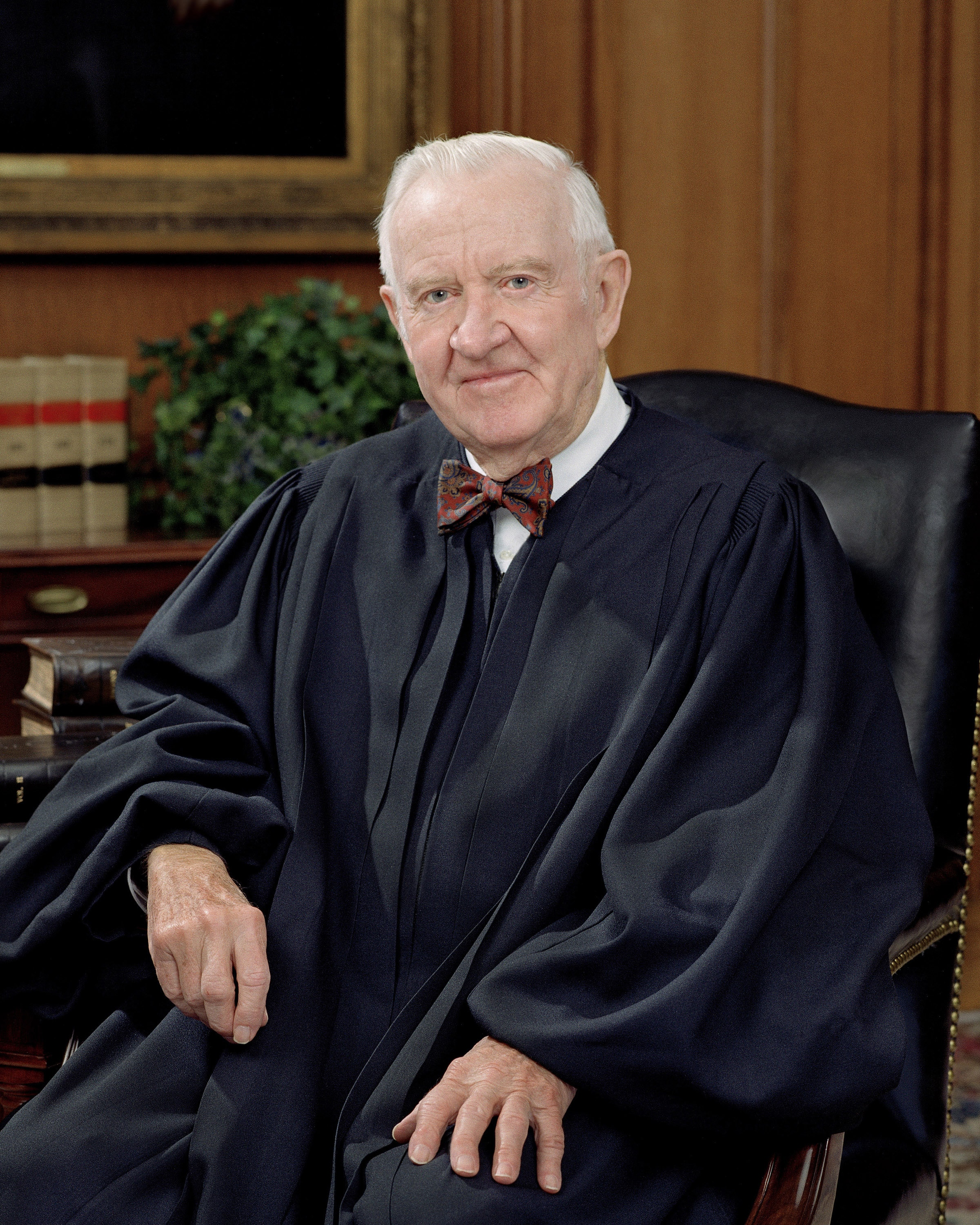
John Paul Stevens

- John Paul Stevens, Associate Justice of the Supreme Court of the United States (1975-2010), Judge of the United States Court of Appeals for the Seventh Circuit (1970-1975) (Deceased)

=== State judges ===
- Rebecca White Berch, Chief Justice (2008–14) and Justice (2002–15) of the Arizona Supreme Court (endorsed Joe Biden)
- Janine P. Geske, Justice of Wisconsin Supreme Court (1993–98) (endorsed Joe Biden)
- Robert F. Orr, Justice of the North Carolina Supreme Court (1994–2004) (endorsed Joe Biden)
- Kevin A. Ross, Judge on the Los Angeles County Superior Court (1999–2005) (endorsed Joe Biden)

== State legislators ==
=== State senators ===
==== Current ====
- Dawn Addiego, New Jersey State Senator from District 8 (2010–present) (Democrat since 2019, endorsed Joe Biden)
- Barbara Bollier, Kansas State Senator from District 7 (2017–2021) (Democrat since 2018)
- John S. McCollister, Nebraska State Senator from District 20 (2015–present) (endorsed Joe Biden)
- Dinah Sykes, Kansas State Senator from District 21 (2017–present) (Democrat since 2018)

==== Former ====
- Greg Brower, State Senator from District 15 (2011–16), U.S. Attorney for the District of Nevada (2008–09), Inspector General of the Government Publishing Office (2004–06)
- Paula Dockery, Florida State Senator from District 15 (2002–12), Florida State Representative from District 64 (1996–2002) (Independent since 2017, endorsed Joe Biden)
- Mike Fasano, State Senator (2002–12), President Pro Tempore of the Florida Senate (2008–10), House Majority Leader (2000–01), Florida State Representative from District 36 (2012–13) and District 45 (1994–2002) (endorsed Joe Biden)
- Susan Gerard, Arizona State Senator from District 18 (2001–03) (endorsed Joe Biden)
- Dawson Hodgson, Rhode Island State Senator from District 35 (2011–15) (endorsed Joe Biden)
- Russ Potts, Virginia State Senator from District 27 (1992–2008) (endorsed Joe Biden)
- Kevin Raye, President of the Maine Senate (2010–12), Maine State Senator from District 29 (2004–12) (endorsed Joe Biden)
- Bob Worsley, Arizona State Senator from District 25 (2013–19) (endorsed Joe Biden)

=== State representatives ===
==== Current ====
- Jon Bramnick, New Jersey State Assemblymember from District 21 (2003–present)
- Stephanie Clayton, Kansas State Representative from District 19 (2013–present) (Democrat since 2018)
- John Lyle, Rhode Island State Representative from District 46 (2019–present) (Independent since 2020)
- Chad Mayes, California State Assemblyman from District 42 (2014–present) (Independent since 2019)
- Cheri Helt, Oregon State Representative from District 54 (2019–2021)
- Andy McKean, Iowa State Representative from District 58 (2017–present), District 44 (1983–1993) District 23 (1979–1983), Iowa State Senator from District 28 (1993–2003) (Democrat since 2019)

==== Former ====
- Aundre Bumgardner, member of the Connecticut House of Representatives from District 41 (2015–2017) (Democrat since 2017, endorsed Joe Biden)
- Jim Cunneen, California State Representative from District 24 (1994–2000) (endorsed Joe Biden)
- Jim Dillard, Virginia State Delegate from District 41 (1983–2005), District 51 (1982–1983), District 19 (1980–1982) (endorsed Joe Biden)
- Beth Fukumoto, Minority Leader of the Hawaii House of Representatives (2014–17), Hawaii State Representative from District 36 (2013–2018), Acting Chair of the Hawaii Republican Party (2011) (Democrat since 2017)
- Deb Gullett, Arizona State Representative from District 11 (2003–2005) (endorsed Joe Biden)
- Doug Hart, Michigan State Representative from District 73 (1999–2005) (endorsed Joe Biden)
- Charles Jeter, North Carolina State Representative from District 92 (2013–2016) (endorsed Joe Biden)
- Becky Jordan, Arizona State Representative from District 16 (1993–1996) (endorsed Joe Biden)
- Mickey Knight, Michigan State Representative from District 96 (1981–1993) (endorsed Joe Biden)
- Joy Koesten, Kansas State Representative from District 28 (2017–2019) (Democrat since 2018)
- David Maturen, Michigan State Representative from District 63 (2015–2019) (endorsed Joe Biden)
- Steve May, Arizona State Representative from District 26 (1999–2003) (endorsed Joe Biden)
- Victor Mitchell, member of the Colorado House of Representatives from District 45 (2007–2009)
- Dennis O'Brien, Speaker of the Pennsylvania House of Representatives from (2007–2008), Pennsylvania State Representative District 169 (1983–2012, 1977–1980) (endorsed Joe Biden)
- Juan-Carlos Planas, Florida State Representative from District 114 (2002–2010) (endorsed Joe Biden)
- Douglas Prescott, New York State Assemblyman from District 26 (1991–97) and District 25 (1985–1991, 1981–1983) (endorsed Joe Biden)
- John Ravitz, New York State Assemblyman from District 73 (1993–2002) and District 66 (1991–1992) (endorsed Joe Biden)
- Charles R. Saxbe, Ohio State Representative from District 75 (1975–1982) (endorsed Joe Biden)
- Todd Smith, Texas State Representative from District 92 (1997–2013) (endorsed Joe Biden)
- Joe Straus, Texas State Representative from District 121 (2005–2019), Speaker of the Texas House of Representatives (2009–2019)
- Chris Vance, 2016 nominee for Senate, Chair of the Washington State Republican Party (2001–2006), Washington State Representative from District 31 (1991–1894) (Independent since 2017, endorsed Joe Biden)
- Rich Vial, Oregon State Representative (2017–2019) (Independent since 2020)
- Roberta Voss, Arizona State Representative from District 19 (1997–2003) (endorsed Joe Biden)
- Katherine Waddell, Virginia State Delegate from District 68 (2006–2008) (Independent, endorsed Joe Biden)
- Cole Wist, Colorado State Representative (2016–2019) (endorsed Joe Biden)
- Gary Clary, South Carolina State Representative from District 3 (2012–2020) (endorsed Joe Biden)

== Municipal and local officials ==
=== Current ===
- Steve Chirico, Mayor of Naperville, Illinois (2015–2023) (endorsed Joe Biden)
- Dev Davis, San Jose City Councilor from District 6 (2017–present) (Independent since 2018)
- Lan Diep, San Jose City Councilor from District 4 (2017–present) (Democrat since 2019, endorsed Joe Biden)
- David Holt, Mayor of Oklahoma City (2018–present)
- Mark Kersey, San Diego City Councilor (2012–2020) (Independent since 2019, endorsed Michael Bloomberg, then Joe Biden)
- Ann Kobayashi, Honolulu City Councilor from District 5 (2009–present, 2002–08), Hawaii State Senator from District 10 (1981–94) (Democrat since 1988, endorsed Joe Biden)
- Johnny Khamis, San Jose City Councilor from District 10 (2012–present) (Independent since 2018)
- Kymberly Pine, Honolulu City Councilor from District 1 (2013–2021), Hawaii State Representative from District 43 (2004–12) (Democrat since 2017, endorsed Joe Biden)
- David Tubiolo, member of the Westchester County Board of Legislators (2016–present) (Democrat since 2020)

=== Former ===
- Clint Eastwood, actor, filmmaker, Mayor of Carmel-by-the-Sea, California (1986-1988) (Libertarian since 2009, Independent in 1974–1997, endorsed Michael Bloomberg)
- Phil Heimlich, member of Cincinnati City Council (1993–2001) (endorsed Joe Biden)
- Joe Lhota, Chair of the Metropolitan Transportation Authority (2017–18, 2012), 2013 nominee for Mayor of New York City and Democrat since 2021 (endorsed Joe Biden)
- Rick Romley, County Attorney for Maricopa County, AZ (2010) (endorsed Joe Biden)

== Former Republican Party officials ==
=== Republican National Committee ===
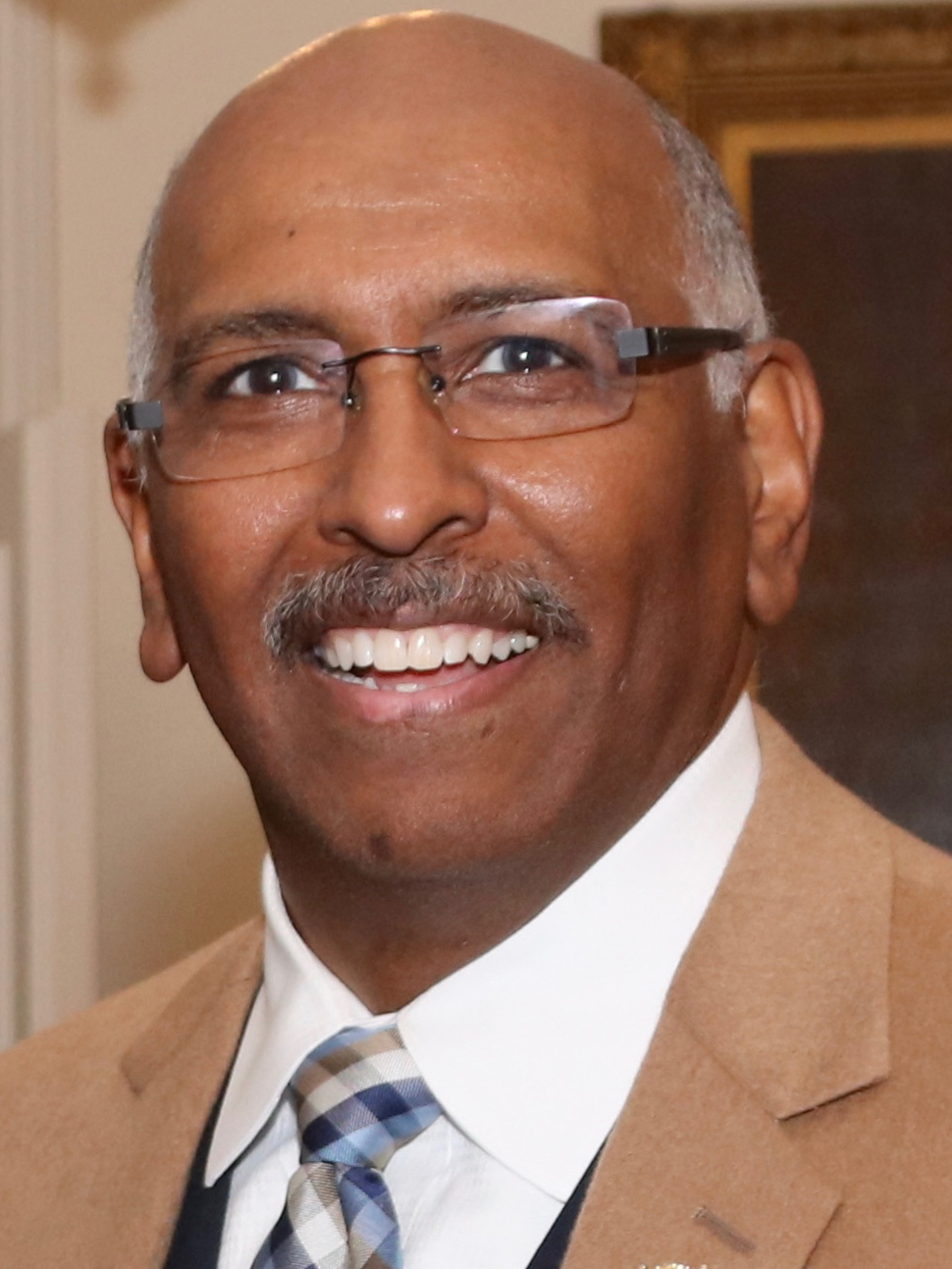
Michael Steele

- Stephen Duprey, member of the Republican National Committee, former chair of the New Hampshire Republican State Committee (endorsed Joe Biden)
- Trevor Francis, communications director for the Republican National Committee (2009) (endorsed Joe Biden)
- Doug Heye, communications director for the Republican National Committee (2009–10) (wrote-in Mitt Romney)
- Ryan Mahoney, communications director for the Republican National Committee (2017–19) (endorsed Joe Biden)
- Lisa Miller, communications director for the Republican National Committee (2007) (endorsed Joe Biden)
- Michael Steele, Chair of the Republican National Committee (2009–11), 2006 nominee for Senate, Lieutenant Governor of Maryland (2003–07), Chair of the Maryland Republican Party (2000–02) (endorsed Joe Biden)

=== State party chairs ===
- Matt Borges, Chair of the Ohio Republican Party (2013–17) (endorsed Joe Biden)
- Pat Brady, Chair of the Illinois Republican Party (2009–13) (endorsed Joe Biden)
- Ryan Call, Chair of the Colorado Republican Party (2011–15) (endorsed Joe Biden)
- Jennifer Horn, Chair of the New Hampshire Republican Party (2013–17), 2008 nominee for NH-02, co-founder of The Lincoln Project (endorsed Joe Biden)

== Activists and public figures ==
=== Celebrities and activists ===
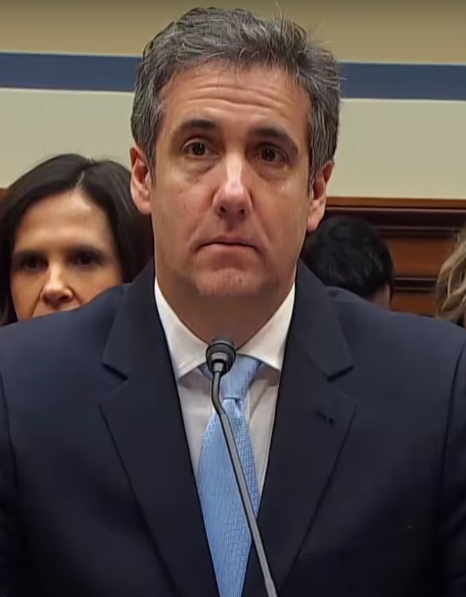
Michael Cohen

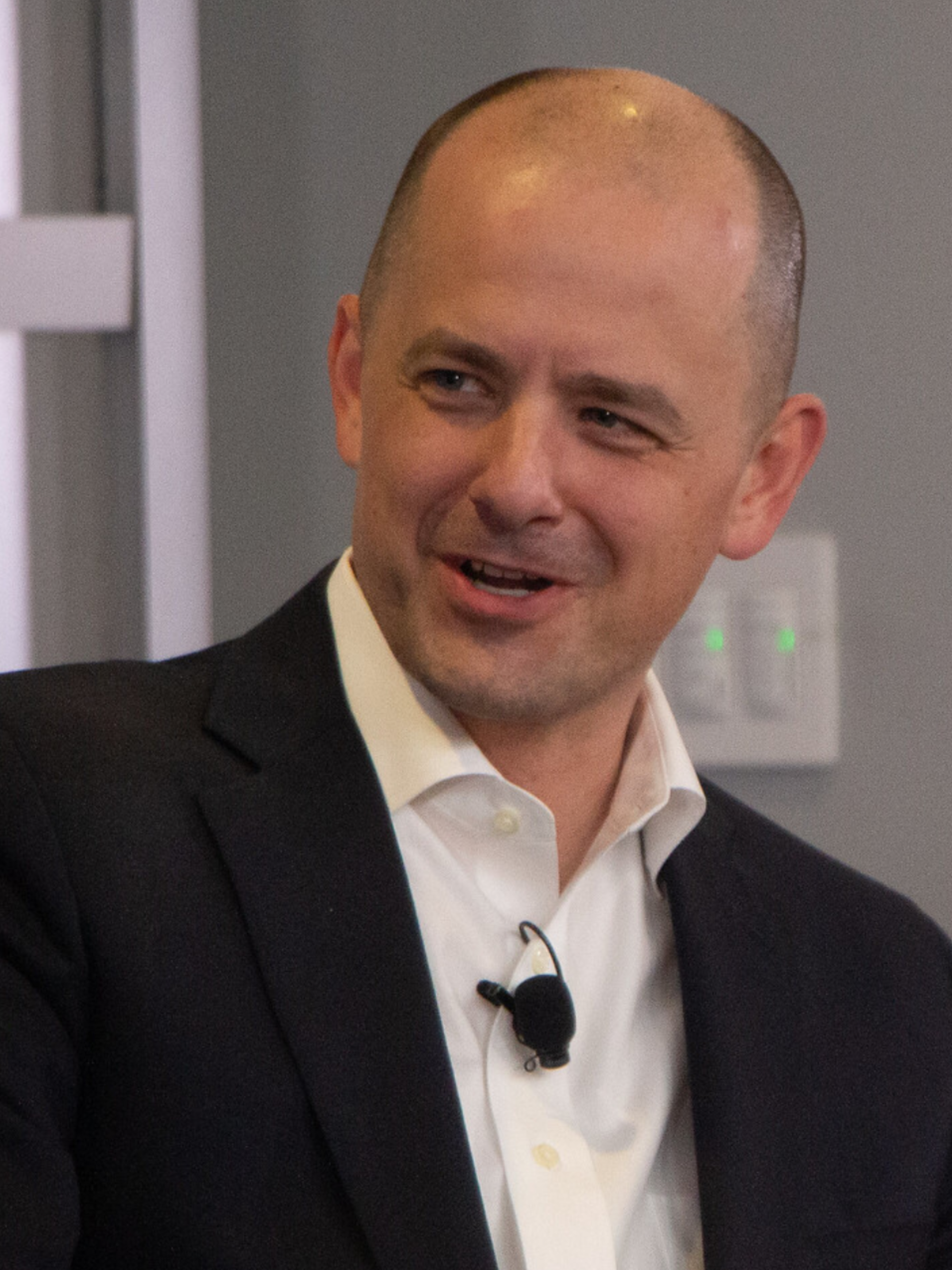
Evan McMullin

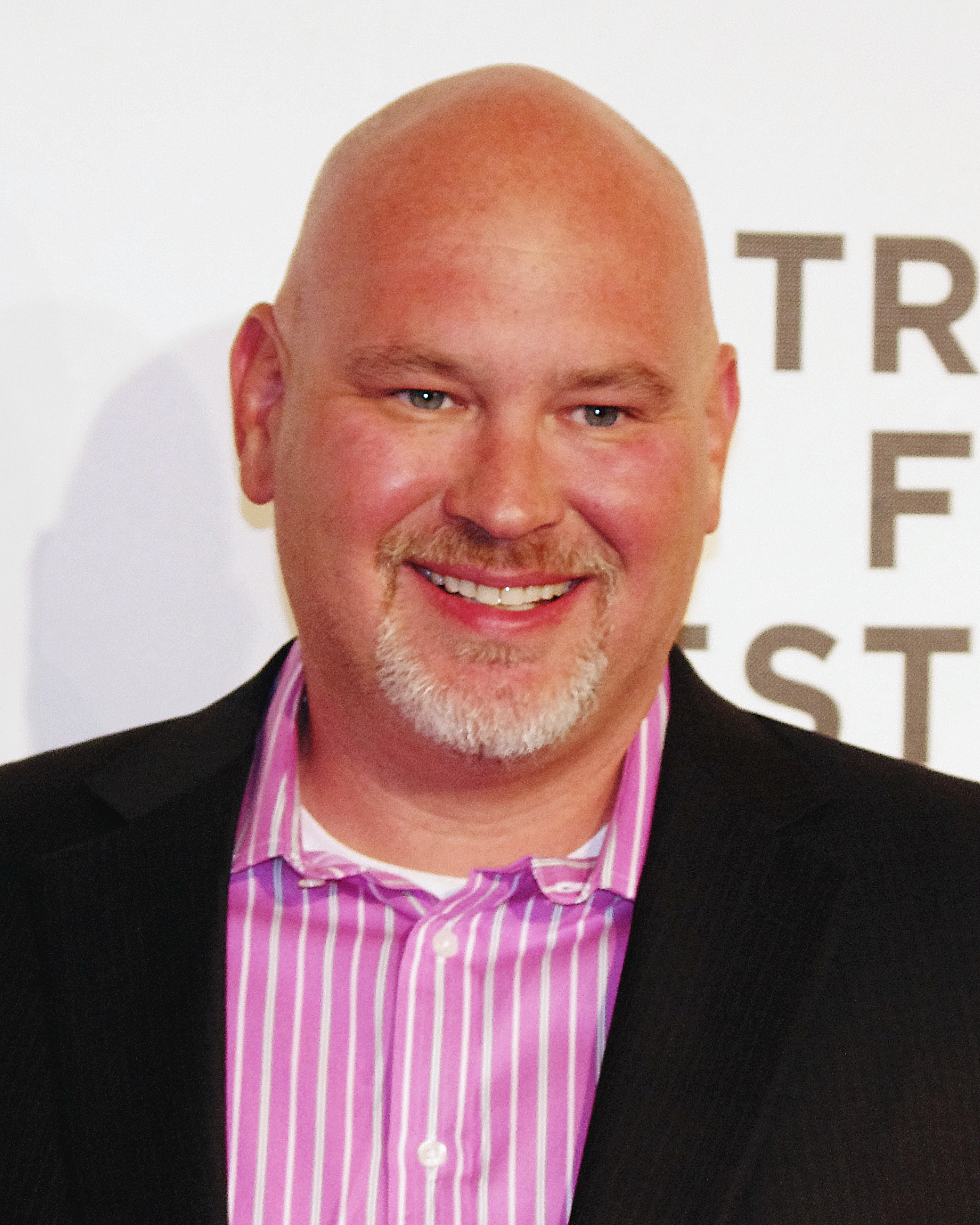
Steve Schmidt

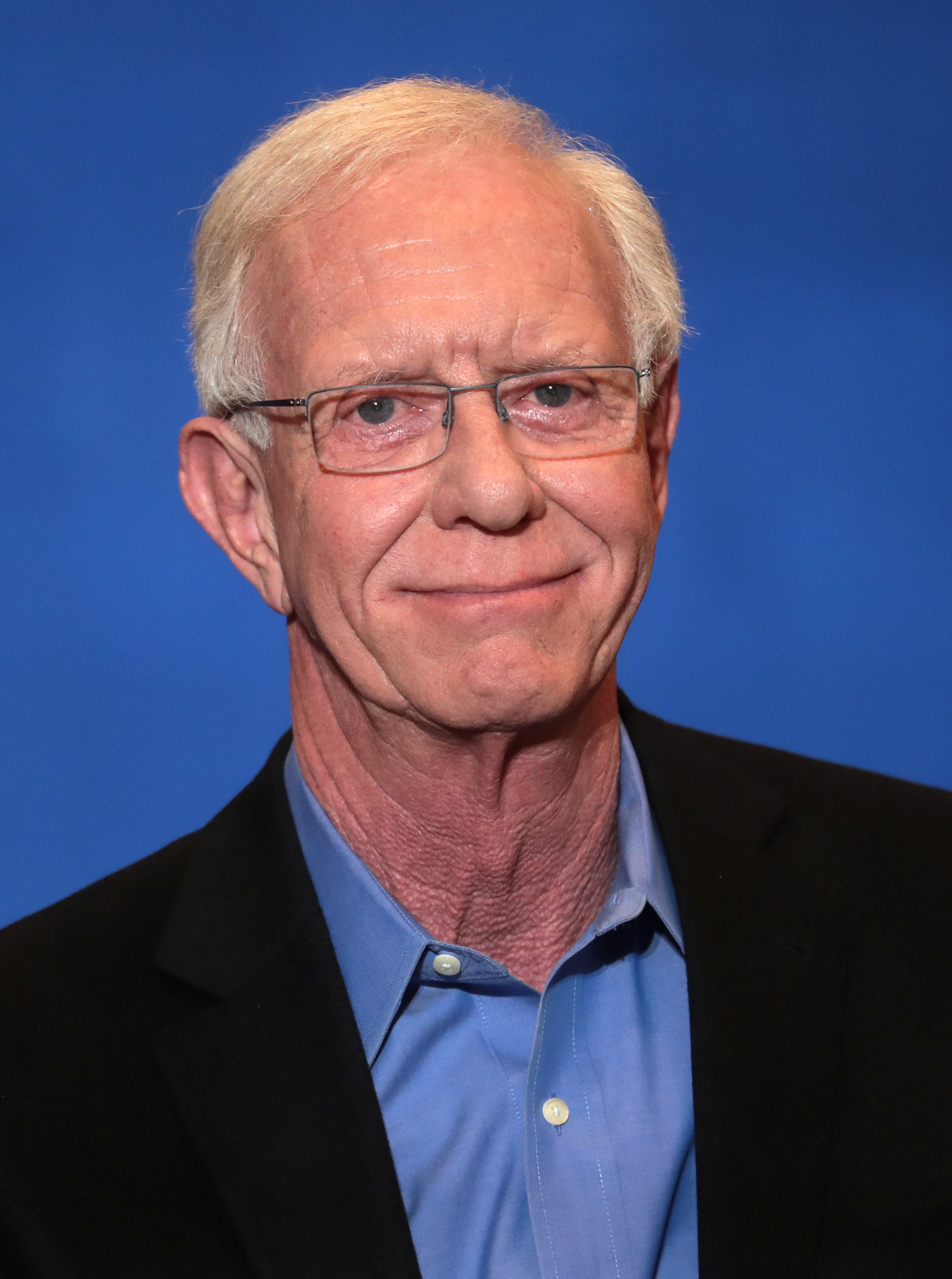
Sully Sullenberger

- Howard Ahmanson Jr., philanthropist, writer (endorsed Brian T. Carroll)
- Charles Barkley, former professional basketball player (endorsed Pete Buttigieg)
- Max Boot, author, consultant, military historian, columnist for The Washington Post (Independent since 2016, endorsed Joe Biden)
- David Brooks, political and cultural commentator, writer for The New York Times
- Niki Christoff, lawyer, operative for the John McCain 2008 presidential campaign (endorsed Joe Biden)
- Michael Cohen, attorney to Donald Trump (2006–18) (Democrat since 2018, endorsed Joe Biden)
- George Conway, attorney, co-founder of The Lincoln Project (Independent since 2018, endorsed Joe Biden)
- Rod Dreher, senior editor and blogger at The American Conservative (endorsed Brian T. Carroll)
- Mindy Finn, political consultant, strategist, and activist, Independent 2016 candidate for Vice President (Independent since 2016)
- Mary Fisher, HIV/AIDS activist (endorsed Joe Biden)
- David French, senior editor of The Dispatch, attorney, political commentator (Independent since 2018, endorsed Joe Biden)
- David Frum, columnist and speechwriter for George W. Bush (endorsed Joe Biden)
- Benjamin Ginsberg, lawyer
- Carey Hart, off-road truck racer (endorsed Joe Biden)
- Jill Hazelbaker, communications executive, political campaign spokesperson (endorsed Joe Biden)
- Patricia Heaton, actress (Independent since 2021)
- Margaret Hoover, conservative political commentator, political strategist, author (endorsed Joe Biden)
- Caitlyn Jenner, television personality and retired Olympic gold medalist decathlete (endorsed Kanye West)
- Dwayne Johnson, actor, producer, businessman, retired professional wrestler, former American football and Canadian football player (Independent since 2017, endorsed Joe Biden)
- Robert Kagan, historian (Independent since 2016)
- Jennifer Lawrence, actress (currently Democrat, endorsed Joe Biden)
- Matt Lewis, political writer
- Sarah Longwell, publisher of The Bulwark, former board chair of the Log Cabin Republicans (endorsed Joe Biden)
- Liz Mair, political and communications consultant
- Megan McArdle, blogger, columnist and writer for The Washington Post (voted for Joe Biden)
- Evan McMullin, former CIA officer, Independent 2016 candidate for President (Independent since 2016, endorsed Joe Biden)
- Mike Murphy, political consultant (endorsed Joe Biden)
- Tom Nichols, national security affairs scholar(endorsed Joe Biden)
- Howard Opinsky, national press secretary of the 2000 McCain presidential campaign (endorsed Joe Biden)
- John Piper, theologian
- Jennifer Rubin, political commentator (endorsed Joe Biden)
- Mark Salter, speechwriter of the 2008 McCain presidential campaign (endorsed Joe Biden)
- Andrea Saul, press secretary of the 2012 Romney presidential campaign (endorsed Joe Biden)
- Rob Schenck, Evangelical minister (endorsed Joe Biden)
- Steve Schmidt, chief strategist for the John McCain 2008 presidential campaign, co-founder of The Lincoln Project (Democrat since 2020, endorsed Joe Biden)
- Tara Setmayer, CNN Political Commentator, Contributor to ABC News and former GOP Communications Director (endorsed Joe Biden)
- Bret Stephens, journalist, editor, and columnist (endorsed Joe Biden)
- Stuart Stevens, writer and senior political strategist for Mitt Romney's 2012 presidential campaign (endorsed Joe Biden)
- Mac Stipanovich, political activist and strategist (Democrat since 2019, endorsed Joe Biden)
- Chesley "Sully" Sullenberger, former U.S. Air Force captain and commercial airline pilot during the water landing of US Airways Flight 1549 (former Republican, endorsed Joe Biden)
- Steven R. Timmermans, former executive director of the Christian Reformed Church in North America (2014–) (endorsed Joe Biden)
- Dane Waters, campaign strategist (endorsed Joe Biden)
- John Weaver, political consultant, chief strategist for the John Kasich 2016 presidential campaign, co-founder of The Lincoln Project (endorsed Joe Biden)
- Peter Wehner, writer for The New York Times, former speechwriter (endorsed Joe Biden)
- George Will, journalist, columnist for The Washington Post (Independent since 2016, endorsed Joe Biden)
- Rick Wilson, political strategist, media consultant, author, co-founder of The Lincoln Project (Independent since 2019, endorsed Joe Biden)

=== Media personalities ===
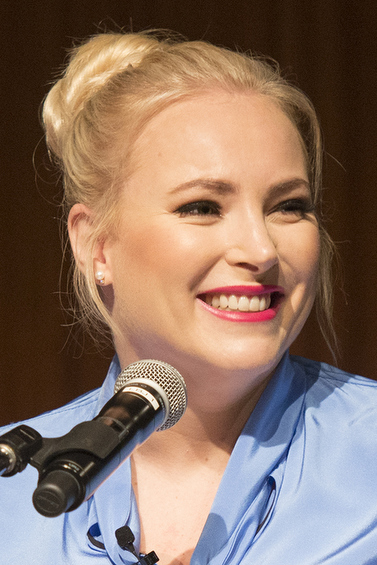
Meghan McCain

- Amanda Carpenter, author, political advisor, speechwriter (endorsed Joe Biden)
- Mona Charen, columnist, journalist, political commentator, writer (endorsed Joe Biden)
- Ann Coulter, media pundit, author, columnist, lawyer
- S. E. Cupp, political commentator and writer (endorsed Joe Biden)
- Susan Del Percio, political strategist, media analyst (endorsed Joe Biden)
- Mark Galli, American minister, author, editor
- Jonah Goldberg, conservative syndicated columnist, author, political analyst, commentator (wrote-in Mitch Daniels)
- Jack Hunter, radio host, political commentator, Politics Editor for Rare.us (endorsed Jo Jorgensen)
- Seth Mandel, conservative author and editor of the Washington Examiner
- Meghan McCain, co-host of The View, daughter of John McCain (endorsed Joe Biden)
- Ana Navarro, political commentator and Republican strategist (endorsed Joe Biden)
- Ramesh Ponnuru, conservative political pundit, journalist, senior editor for National Review
- Charlie Sykes, conservative talk show radio host, founder of The Bulwark (endorsed Joe Biden)
- Kevin D. Williamson, conservative political commentator, roving correspondent for National Review

== Business executives and leaders ==
- Mike Fernandez, founder of MBF Healthcare Partners
- Carly Fiorina, 2016 candidate for president, California 2010 nominee for Senate, Chair (2000–05), President and CEO (1999–2005) of Hewlett-Packard (endorsed Joe Biden)
- Cindy McCain, businesswoman and philanthropist, widow of the late Senator John McCain (endorsed Joe Biden)
- Les Otten, CEO of the American Skiing Company, candidate for Governor of Maine in 2010 (endorsed Joe Biden)
- Curtis Sliwa, founder and chief executive officer of Guardian Angels
- Barry Sternlicht, CEO of Starwood Capital Group (endorsed Joe Biden)
- Christy Walton, heiress of Walmart
- Meg Whitman, CEO of Quibi, CEO of Hewlett Packard Enterprise (2011–18), 2010 nominee for Governor of California, CEO of eBay (1998–2008) (endorsed Joe Biden)

== Organizations ==
=== National organizations ===
- 43 Alumni for Biden (endorsed Joe Biden)
- Defending Democracy Together (endorsed Joe Biden)
- The Lincoln Project (endorsed Joe Biden)
- National Committee of Asian American Republicans (endorsed Joe Biden)
- REPAIR (endorsed Joe Biden)
- Republican Voters Against Trump (endorsed Joe Biden)
- Right Side PAC (endorsed Joe Biden)

=== News ===
- The Bulwark
- The Detroit News
- New Hampshire Union Leader (endorsed Joe Biden)

=== Republican-related organizations ===
- Bowdoin College Republicans
- University of Vermont College Republicans

== See also ==
- List of Donald Trump 2020 presidential campaign endorsements
- List of former Trump administration officials who endorsed Joe Biden
- List of Joe Biden 2020 presidential campaign endorsements
- List of Republicans who opposed the Donald Trump 2016 presidential campaign
- List of Republicans who opposed the Donald Trump 2024 presidential campaign
- Never Trump movement
- Republican reactions to Donald Trump's claims of 2020 election fraud
- Republican in Name Only
