= List of Republicans who opposed the Donald Trump presidential campaign =

List of Republicans who opposed the Donald Trump presidential campaign may refer to:

- List of Republicans who opposed the Donald Trump 2016 presidential campaign
- List of Republicans who opposed the Donald Trump 2020 presidential campaign
- List of Republicans who opposed the Donald Trump 2024 presidential campaign

== See also ==
Never Trump movement
