= John McCain presidential campaign =

John McCain unsuccessfully ran for president twice:

- John McCain 2000 presidential campaign
- John McCain 2008 presidential campaign
