= George Floyd protests in New Hampshire =

2020 civil unrest after the murder of George Floyd

- Part of George Floyd protests
- Date: May 30, 2020 – June 13, 2020 (2 weeks)
- Location: New Hampshire, United States
- Caused by: Police brutality; Institutional racism against African Americans; Reaction to the murder of George Floyd; Economic, racial and social inequality

This is a list of protests in New Hampshire related to the murder of George Floyd.

Cities in New Hampshire in which a protest with 100 or more participants was held.

== Locations ==
=== Bristol ===
On June 3, about 200 people protested at Kelley Park in Bristol. They knelt in silence for eight minutes before marching through the streets.

=== Concord ===
On June 6, nearly 2,000 people marched to the New Hampshire State House in Concord to protest.

=== Conway ===
On May 31, about 200 people protested at the intersection of Routes 16 and 153 and Washington Street.

=== Dover ===
On June 1, hundreds came to a vigil at Henry Law Park in Dover for George Floyd.

=== Dublin ===
A protest occurred in Dublin on May 30. Another took place on June 13 outside the Dublin Community Church, after which the church bell rang for eight minutes and forty-six seconds.

=== Hanover ===
Over 300 town residents and Dartmouth College students protested on the Hanover town green on June 1.

=== Hollis ===
Residents from Hollis and neighboring towns congregated outside of the Lawrence Barn Community Center in Hollis, New Hampshire on Sunday, June 26, 2020, for the Rally For Black Lives.

=== Keene ===
Protesters rallied in Center Square on May 30 in Keene.

On June 3, about 700 protesters held signs and protested at a major intersection in downtown Keene.

=== Manchester ===
On May 30, 2020, approximately 1,000 people rallied in downtown Manchester, beginning their protest at Veterans Park, marching down Elm Street, and ending their march back at the park. Although the protests were peaceful, a tense moment happened at around 1:30 PM when two men in a pickup truck with a blue Trump 2020 flag attached to it drove up to and argued with protesters, with one of the men exiting the truck and brandishing a handgun. Shortly thereafter, the two men—aged 43 and 19—were arrested and charged with felony riot and felony criminal threatening.

On June 2, a rally was held in Manchester with about 700 in attendance. At nightfall, the crowd shrank to about 100 when protesters began throwing fireworks into traffic and businesses along South Willow Street. Subsequently, a clash broke out with police. By 11:00 PM, 13 people had been arrested and all remaining protesters had dispersed.

=== Nashua ===
Over 1,000 people attended a vigil at Greeley Park in Nashua on Saturday, June 6, 2020.

=== Peterborough ===
A protest occurred along Routes 101 and 102 in Peterborough on May 30.

=== Portsmouth ===
On June 6, about 1,000 protesters took part in a march from Traip Academy in Kittery, Maine, to Market Square in Portsmouth. The event was organized by former and current Traip students.
