= Greeley Park =

Public park in Nashua, New Hampshire, US

Coordinates: 42°46′50″N 71°27′48″W

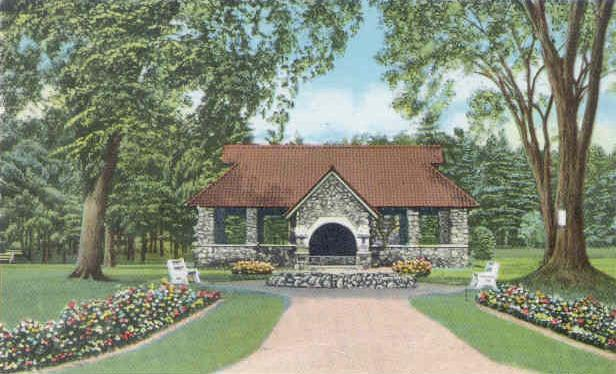
Entrance to Greeley Park, from a c. 1920 postcard

Greeley Park is a public park in Nashua, New Hampshire, United States, occupying 125 acres (51 ha) extending from the Merrimack River, across Concord Street, to Manchester Street. The property was originally bought in 1801 by Joseph Greeley, who passed it on to his son after his death. The land was deeded to the city of Nashua in 1896 by Joseph Thornton Greeley, the grandson of the original Joseph Greeley. In 1908, John E. Cotton donated $5000, an amount that was "matched by city funds", to change the Greeley Farm into a public park. The money was used to create a "stone and cement rest house, a fountain, a shallow pond, a gravel walk, and flower beds".

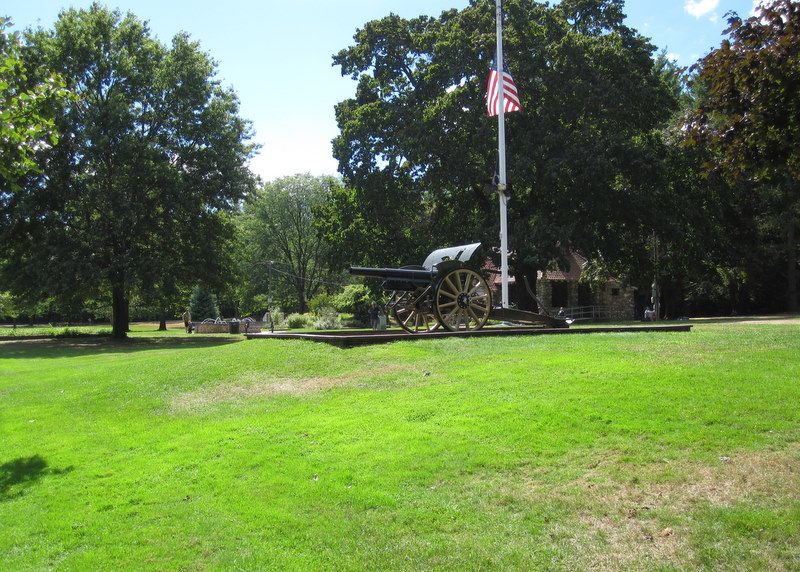
A German howitzer from World War I is located in the park

Greeley Park hosts many citywide events, such as the Fairy Tale Festival, Art Show, and Halloween "Fright Night", and is a traditional photogenic place for prom night for Nashua High School South and North. On a smaller scale, at the bandstand in the spring and summer there are plays, movies and music festivals. The park also features hiking trails, horseshoe pits, ball fields, tennis courts, a community gardening section, and the only boat ramp on the west side of the Merrimack River between the Massachusetts border and the first rapids in New Hampshire.

At the northern boundary of the park, near the river, the park is dealing with the threat of creosote contamination that flows from the closed nearby historic railroad tie plant.

During September 1999, American politician John McCain officially announced his candidacy for president of the United States to a crowd of around one thousand in Greeley Park, beginning his first presidential campaign.

During June 2020, Black Lives Matter hosted a vigil for George Floyd that was attended by over 1,000 people
