= Howard Opinsky =

- Occupation: Special Advisor to Five Blocks
- Known for: Digital communication strategist

Howard Opinsky is a business and political communications strategist and a special advisor to digital reputation management company Five Blocks. He was the national press secretary for U.S. Senator John McCain’s (R-AZ) 2000 presidential campaign. He was also a campaign strategist and spokesman for other Republican candidates at the national and state levels.

Opinsky has been quoted in the media as a spokesman for candidates and causes and as a political strategist commenting on a variety of breaking news events. He has also been a guest lecturer at Harvard, Penn State, and various trade groups to discuss communication, the media, and politics.

He was the executive vice president at the Washington, D.C., office of Weber Shandwick. He was the executive vice president and leader of the US Corporate Advisory Practice of Hill+Knowlton Strategies and the managing director of Global Corporate Communications at JPMorgan Chase & Co.

== Education ==
Opinsky earned a B.A in political communication in 1991 from The George Washington University.

== Career ==
=== Five Blocks ===
In February 2018 Opinsky joined digital reputation management company Five Blocks as president.

=== Hill+Knowlton Strategies ===
Opinsky was appointed executive vice president and general manager of H+K Strategies, Washington, D.C., office on March 1, 2012.

=== JP Morgan Chase & Co. ===
On January 11, 2011, Opinsky was named managing director of communication at JP Morgan Chase & Co.

=== Powell Tate ===
Opinsky spent ten years at Powell Tate, Weber Shandwick's public affairs brand, and was the head of the corporate and public affairs groups at Powell Tate. In addition to his direct client work, he was responsible for developing new business strategies for crisis, corporate, and public affairs clients across all business sectors.

Opinsky was the primary communication advisor and spokesman for former AIG Chairman and CEO Maurice “Hank” Greenberg. Mr. Greenberg fought a highly publicized battle to maintain his reputation amid a civil lawsuit from New York Attorney General Eliot Spitzer and investigations by the U.S. Department of Justice and the U.S. Securities and Exchange Commission. Opinsky provided strategic communication counsel to the Business Roundtable’s Energy Task Force and the U.S. Climate Action Partnership (USCAP), two CEO-level organizations promoting comprehensive energy reform plans.

In the aftermath of the terrorist attacks on September 11, Opinsky was tapped by then-Mayor Rudy Giuliani to advise on communications about the relief effort.

== Political career ==
As national press secretary for Senator McCain’s 2000 presidential bid, Opinsky designed, managed and led the media strategy that came to be known as the “Straight Talk Express.” The landmark strategy rested on open media access to the candidate, operatives, and behind the scenes of the campaign. Opinsky was responsible for the campaign’s media communication and was the primary spokesperson from the campaign’s inception to its final day.

Opinsky has also served as a media strategist and campaign operative for a variety of candidates and political leaders including U.S. Senator Richard Shelby (R-AL) and former U.S. Senator Phil Gramm (R-TX).

In 2020, he endorsed McCain's vice presidential opponent Joe Biden for president.

== Personal life ==
Opinsky lives in Washington, D.C., with his wife, Colleen Connors, and their two daughters, and golden retriever.
