= John McCain 2000 presidential campaign =

American political campaign

John McCain for President 2000
- Campaign: 2000 Republican primaries
- Candidate: John McCain; U.S. Representative from Arizona (1983–1987); U.S. Senator from Arizona (1987–2018)
- Affiliation: Republican Party
- Status: Withdrawn (March 9, 2000)
- Announced: April 13, 1999
- Launched: September 27, 1999
- Key people: Rick Davis (Manager); Mike Murphy (Strategist); John Weaver (Chief Political Adviser); Greg Stevens (Media Adviser); Mark Salter (Chief Speechwriter); Howard Opinsky (Press Officer); Craig Turk (General Counsel)

Website
- John McCain 2000 (archived – Mar. 6, 2000)

The 2000 presidential campaign of John McCain, the United States Senator from Arizona, began in September 1999. He announced his run for the Republican Party nomination for the presidency of the United States in the 2000 presidential election. Although McCain declared himself a candidate in April 1999 during the Kosovo crisis, the campaign's formal kickoff did not take place until September 27, 1999, in Nashua, New Hampshire.

McCain was the main challenger to Texas Governor George W. Bush, who had the political and financial support of most of the party establishment. McCain staged an upset win in the February 2000 New Hampshire primary, capitalizing on a message of political reform and "straight talk" that appealed to moderate Republican and independent voters and to the press. McCain's momentum was halted when Bush won the South Carolina primary later that month, in a contest that became famous for its bitter nature and an underground smear campaign run against McCain.

McCain won some subsequent primaries, but after the March 2000 Super Tuesday contests he was well behind in delegates and withdrew. He reluctantly endorsed Bush two months later and made occasional appearances for him during the general election.

The campaign was built around campaign finance reform, opposition to special interests, public service, national security, and McCain's military biography, all amplified by the Straight Talk Express bus and an intensive town-hall strategy in New Hampshire. Retrospectives have often treated the bid as both the high-water mark of McCain's "maverick" reputation and a major unrealized alternative in Republican Party politics at the turn of the twenty-first century.

== Leading up to the announcement ==
McCain was mentioned as a possible candidate for the Republican nomination beginning in 1997, but he took few steps to pursue it, instead concentrating on his 1998 senate re-election. The decision of General Colin Powell not to run helped persuade McCain that there might be an opening for him. McCain later wrote that he had a "vague aspiration" of running for president for a long time. He would also be candid about his motivation: "I didn't decide to run for president to start a national crusade for the political reforms I believed in or to run a campaign as if it were some grand act of patriotism. In truth, I wanted to be president because it had become my ambition to become president. I was sixty-two years old when I made the decision, and I thought it was my one shot at the prize."

Potential weaknesses of a McCain candidacy included his senatorial accomplishments skewing towards the maverick side rather than those that would appeal to the party core, a lack of funds and of fund-raising prowess, and an unpredictability of personality and temperament. Potential assets included favorable treatment in the political media, as well as being featured on A&E's Biography series, and support from veterans. National polls showed McCain with low name recognition, but once voters were asked about a hypothetical candidate with a similar military biography, the numbers improved dramatically.

McCain's visibility rose further in 1999 because campaign finance reform—already identified with the McCain–Feingold bill—was being debated in the Senate at the same time he was exploring a White House bid. The failure of the legislation in October 1999 reinforced the campaign's central theme that special interests and party leaders had too much control over Washington. The Federal Election Commission declared McCain eligible for primary matching funds on July 1, 1999, giving the effort an important financial foundation before the formal launch.

== Announcements and Kosovo ==
McCain had initially planned on announcing his candidacy and beginning active campaigning on April 6, 1999. There was to be a four-day roadshow, whose first day would symbolically begin at the United States Naval Academy in Annapolis, Maryland, then see early primary states New Hampshire and South Carolina, before concluding in home Phoenix, Arizona with a big audience, marching bands, and thousands of balloons.

However, the Kosovo War intervened. On March 24, the NATO bombing campaign against the Federal Republic of Yugoslavia began. McCain had voted the day before in favor of approval for the Clinton administration's action, saying "Atrocities are the signature of the Serbian Army. They've been carrying out atrocities since 1992. We must not permit the genocide that Milosevic has in mind for Kosovo to continue. We are at a critical hour." He was critical of past inaction by the Clinton administration in the matter, and within days was urging that the use of ground troops not be ruled out. McCain became a very frequent guest on television talk shows discussing the conflict, and his "We are in it, now we must win it" stance drew much attention. On March 31, three American soldiers were captured by Yugoslavia; the next day, McCain canceled his planned roadshow, stating "this is not an appropriate time to launch a political campaign." He received media praise for his action and continued to be a highly visible spokesman for strong action regarding Kosovo; CNN pundit Mark Shields said that, "In thirty-five years in Washington, I have never seen a debate dominated by an individual in the minority party as I've seen this one dominated by John McCain."

On April 13, McCain simply issued a statement without fanfare that he would be a candidate: "While now is not the time for the celebratory tour I had planned, I am a candidate for president and I will formally kick off my campaign at a more appropriate time." McCain and his wife Cindy would make some campaign-related appearances over the spring and summer. The delay in the formal kickoff also gave McCain months of high visibility as one of the Republican Party's most forceful voices on foreign policy while avoiding the optics of a celebratory launch during a military crisis.

McCain's co-authored, best-selling family memoir, Faith of My Fathers, published in August 1999, helped promote the new start of his campaign. The book garnered largely positive reviews, and McCain went on a 15-city book tour during September. The tour's success and the book's high sales led to the themes of the memoir, which included McCain talking more about his Vietnam prisoner-of-war experience than he had in the past, becoming a major part of McCain's campaign messaging.

McCain finally formally announced his candidacy on September 27, 1999, before a thousand people in Greeley Park in Nashua, New Hampshire, saying "It is because I owe America more than she has ever owed me that I am a candidate for president to the United States." He further said he was staging "a fight to take our government back from the power brokers and special interests and return it to the people and the noble cause of freedom it was created to serve." As originally planned, he began his announcement day with a visit to the Naval Academy.

== Campaign staff and policy team ==
McCain's campaign used many veteran Washington political insiders, including some who had an insurgency-oriented or contrarian mindset. Rick Davis was the campaign manager for the McCain effort, while Mike Murphy was the overall strategist and John Weaver the chief political adviser. Greg Stevens was the media adviser and Mark Salter was the chief speechwriter (and credited co-author of McCain's books). Howard Opinsky was the campaign's press officer. Craig Turk was the general counsel.

After a while, a rivalry formed between Davis, at campaign headquarters, and Weaver and Murphy, who traveled on the campaign bus. Davis wanted a larger role in campaign strategy, and eventually differences between the two factions escalated to attacks made via the press.

The campaign also benefited from support by veteran New Hampshire Republicans such as former senator Warren Rudman, whose endorsement and organizational help in the state strengthened McCain's insurgent appeal among independents and reform-minded Republicans.

== Campaign message and strategy ==
McCain's campaign sought to turn his Senate image as a "maverick" into an outsider presidential candidacy. He cast himself as a reform Republican, emphasizing campaign finance reform, public service, military readiness, and a willingness to confront party orthodoxy. This message helped distinguish him from Bush, whose candidacy rested more heavily on establishment backing, fundraising strength, and support from core Republican constituencies.

Contemporary observers also noted a tension between McCain's reformist image and his generally conservative Senate voting record. That contrast became part of the press fascination with the campaign, helping explain why McCain could appeal to moderates, independents, and reporters without ever fully ceasing to be a conservative Republican senator.

McCain's style of campaigning was inseparable from the Straight Talk Express, a rolling press cabin and town-hall circuit that allowed him to compensate for Bush's financial advantages with free media and direct voter contact. Later reminiscences from reporters and aides described the arrangement as unusually open and central to the campaign's identity.

== Campaign developments 1999 ==
There was a crowded field of Republican candidates, but the big leader in terms of establishment party support and fundraising was Texas Governor and presidential son George W. Bush. Indeed, by the time of McCain's formal announcement, top-echelon Republican contenders such as Lamar Alexander, John Kasich, and Dan Quayle were already withdrawing from the race due to Bush's strength. As McCain would later write, "No one thought I had much of a chance, including me." Four of McCain's fifty-five fellow Republican senators endorsed his candidacy.

The day after McCain announced, Bush made a show of visiting Phoenix and displaying that he, not McCain, had the endorsement of Arizona Governor Jane Dee Hull and several other prominent local political figures. McCain did have the support of the rest of the Republican Arizona congressional delegation. Hull would continue to attack McCain during the campaign, and was featured in high-profile Arizona Republic and New York Times stories about McCain's reputation for having a bad temper, with the latter featuring on-the-record criticism from Governor of Michigan John Engler. By early November, stories about McCain's temper problem were frequent enough that Washington Post media critic Howard Kurtz wrote a survey article about them. Some of McCain's opponents, including those in or close to the Senate Republican leadership, intimated that McCain's temper was a sign of mental instability. The notion that this was due to McCain's POW days caused Admiral James Stockdale, a fellow former POW and 1992 vice-presidential candidate for Ross Perot, to write an op-ed piece for The New York Times, "John McCain in the Crucible". In it, Stockdale said that the reverse was true: that the experience of resisting during the POW experience made former POWs more emotionally stable in later life, not less. In early December, McCain released some 1,500 pages of his medical and psychiatric records, which showed several psychiatric evaluations over a number of years following his POW release that indicated no signs of lingering mental or emotional difficulty from that period.

Bush avoided most of the scheduled Republican Party debates during 1999, including one held on November 21 at Arizona State University in McCain's home state. There McCain debated second-tier candidates Alan Keyes, Orrin Hatch, and Steve Forbes instead. Bush finally did participate in the December 6 debate from the Orpheum Theatre in Phoenix, by which time McCain was so busy campaigning in New Hampshire that he had to join via a video linkup. There McCain's signature push for campaign finance reform led to one of the few lively exchanges in an otherwise placid event.

Following political consultant Mike Murphy's advice, McCain decided to skip the initial event of the nomination season, the Iowa caucus, where his long opposition to ethanol subsidies would be unpopular and his late start and lack of base party support would hurt him in the grassroots organizing necessary for success in the state. (He had earlier skipped the August 1999 Iowa Straw Poll, labeling it a sham.) McCain focused on introducing his biographical story, especially his Vietnam and POW experiences; a videocassette telling the story was sent to 50,000 voters in the first two primary states, as well as to military veterans in other states.

By late 1999, the campaign had also begun receiving federal matching funds; in December 1999 the FEC certified the first round of 2000 matching funds for McCain and other candidates.

== Caucuses and primaries 2000 ==
=== New Hampshire ===
The results of the Republican primaries and caucuses. Red: states won by Bush / Yellow: states won by McCain

By skipping Iowa, McCain was able to focus instead on the New Hampshire primary, where his message held appeal to independents and where Bush's father had never been very popular. At first, McCain attracted small crowds and little media attention. But by November 1999, McCain had become competitive, measuring evenly with Bush in polls. Bush said he realized McCain was a strong candidate there: "If I had to guess why Senator McCain is doing well, it's people respect him and so do I. He's a good man."

McCain traveled on a campaign bus called the Straight Talk Express, whose name capitalized on his reputation as a political maverick who would speak his mind. In visits to towns he gave a ten-minute talk focused on campaign reform issues, then announced he would stay until he answered every question that everyone had. He pledged that "I will never tell you a lie." He conducted 114 of these town hall meetings, speaking in every town in New Hampshire in an example of "retail politics" that overcame Bush's familiar name. His growing number of supporters became known as "McCainiacs". Retrospective coverage would return repeatedly to the scale of this effort, with CBS News noting in 2018 that McCain had held 114 town halls across the state and had made New Hampshire central to his political identity.

McCain was famously accessible to the press, using free media to compensate for his lack of funds. As one reporter later recounted, "McCain talked all day long with reporters on his Straight Talk Express bus; he talked so much that sometimes he said things that he shouldn't have, and that's why the media loved him." Some McCain aides saw the senator as naturally preferring the company of reporters to other politicians.

McCain and Bush argued over their proposals for tax cuts; McCain criticized Bush's plan as too large and too beneficial to the wealthy. McCain preferred a smaller cut that would allocate more of the surplus towards the solvency of Social Security and Medicare. McCain pushed his signature issue of campaign finance reform, and was the only candidate to talk much about foreign policy and defense issues.

On February 1, 2000, McCain won the primary with 49 percent of the vote to Bush's 30 percent, and suddenly was the focus of media attention. Other Republican candidates had dropped out or failed to gain traction, and McCain became Bush's only serious opponent. Analysts predicted that a McCain victory in the crucial South Carolina primary might give his insurgency campaign unstoppable momentum; a degree of fear and panic crept into not only the Bush campaign but also the Republican establishment and movement conservatism. Bush's top campaign staff met and strategized what to do about McCain; one advisor said, "We gotta hit him hard." The upset was widely interpreted as a shock to Bush's aura of inevitability and as proof that McCain's insurgent strategy had turned the nomination race into a genuine two-man contest.

=== South Carolina ===
The battle between Bush and McCain for South Carolina has entered U.S. political lore as one of the nastiest, dirtiest, and most brutal ever. On the one hand, Bush switched his label for himself from "compassionate conservative" to "reformer with results", as part of trying to co-opt McCain's popular message of reform. On the other hand, a variety of business and interest groups that McCain had challenged in the past now pounded him with negative ads.

The day that a new poll showed McCain five points ahead in the state, Bush allied himself on stage with a marginal and controversial veterans activist named J. Thomas Burch, who accused McCain of having "abandoned the veterans" on POW/MIA and Agent Orange issues: "He came home from Vietnam and forgot us." Incensed, McCain ran ads accusing Bush of lying and comparing the governor to Bill Clinton, which Bush complained was "about as low a blow as you can give in a Republican primary"; many Republicans thought comparing Bush's truthfulness to Bill Clinton's dishonesty was distasteful smear by McCain. An unidentified party began a semi-underground smear campaign against McCain, delivered by push polls, faxes, e-mails, flyers, audience plants, and the like. These claimed most famously that he had fathered a black child out of wedlock (the McCains' dark-skinned daughter Bridget was adopted from Bangladesh; this misrepresentation was thought to be an especially effective slur in a Deep South state where race was still central), but also that his wife Cindy was a drug addict, that he was a homosexual, and that he was a "Manchurian Candidate" traitor or mentally unstable from his North Vietnam POW days. The Bush campaign strongly denied any involvement with these attacks; Bush said he would fire anyone who ran defamatory push polls. During a break in a debate, Bush put his hand on McCain's arm and reiterated that he had no involvement in the attacks; McCain replied, "Don't give me that shit. And take your hands off me."

Bush mobilized the state's evangelical voters, and leading conservative broadcaster Rush Limbaugh entered the fray supporting Bush and claiming McCain was a favorite of liberal Democrats. Polls swung in Bush's favor; by not accepting federal matching funds for his campaign, Bush was not limited in how much money he could spend on advertisements, while McCain was near his limit. With three days to go, McCain shut down his negative ads against Bush and tried to stress a positive image. But McCain's stressing of campaign finance reform, and how Bush's proposed tax cuts would benefit the wealthy, did not appeal to core Republicans in the state.

McCain lost South Carolina on February 19, with 42 percent of the vote against Bush's 53 percent, allowing Bush to regain the momentum. Subsequent accounts by journalists, documentarians, and participants would turn the contest into a defining episode in modern Republican primary history, even as disputes persisted over exactly which Bush allies or independent actors were responsible for the ugliest tactics.

=== On to Super Tuesday ===
McCain's campaign never completely recovered from his defeat in South Carolina. He did rebound partially by winning in Arizona and Michigan on February 22, mocking Governor Hull's opposition in the former. In Michigan, which he won 50 percent to 43 percent in an upset, he captured many Democratic and independent votes, who combined made up over half of the primary electorate.

Still reeling from his South Carolina experience, McCain made a February 28 speech in Virginia Beach that criticized Christian leaders, including Pat Robertson and Jerry Falwell, as divisive; McCain declared, "... we embrace the fine members of the religious conservative community. But that does not mean that we will pander to their self-appointed leaders." He also made an off-the-cuff, unserious remark on the Straight Talk Express that referred to Robertson and Falwell as "forces of evil", that came across as angry hostility to many Christian conservatives. McCain lost the Virginia primary on February 29, as well as one in Washington. His attack on Robertson and Falwell, combined with the fallout from South Carolina, deepened the sense among many social conservatives that McCain was openly hostile to the religious right, a perception that further undercut him in several Southern and border-state contests.

McCain had stated in mid-February that "I hate the gooks", referring to his captors during the Vietnam War. This use gained some media attention in California, which had a large Asian American population. After criticism from some in that community, McCain vowed to no longer use the term, saying, "I will continue to condemn those who unfairly mistreated us. But out of respect to a great number of people for whom I hold in very high regard, I will no longer use the term that has caused such discomfort." Reaction among Vietnamese Americans to McCain's use of this term was mixed although supportive of McCain himself, and exit polls in the primary in California showed that they strongly supported him. This was not the first or the last example of controversial remarks by McCain.

A week later on March 7, 2000, he lost nine of the thirteen primaries on Super Tuesday to Bush, including large states such as California, New York, Ohio, and Georgia; McCain's wins were confined to the New England states of Massachusetts, Rhode Island, Connecticut and Vermont. His overall loss on that day has been attributed to his going "off message", ineffectively accusing Bush of being anti-Catholic due to having visited Bob Jones University and getting into a verbal battle with leaders of the Religious Right.

=== Withdrawal ===
Throughout the campaign, McCain had achieved parity with Bush among self-identified Republicans only in the northeastern states; in most of the rest of the country, Bush ran way well ahead of McCain among Republicans, enough to overcome McCain's strength among independents and Democrats.

With little hope of overcoming Bush's delegate lead after Super Tuesday, McCain withdrew from the race on March 9, 2000. In his remarks before a crowd of supporters and onlookers with the red rocks of Sedona, Arizona as a backdrop, McCain said that "When we began this campaign, we knew that ours was a difficult challenge" but that now the challenge had become "considerably more difficult" and that it was time to stop. Nevertheless, he said he would not abandon the idea of political reform that the campaign had embraced, saying "I will never walk away from a fight for what I know is right and just for our country." Official Federal Election Commission primary returns later showed Bush finishing with 12,034,676 votes to McCain's 6,061,332, underscoring how quickly the race had consolidated after Super Tuesday.

== General election ==
Following the end of his campaign, McCain returned to the Senate, where he was welcomed with respect for the effort he had made, his openness in the campaign, and the attacks he had undergone. Other Republicans sought out his endorsement in their general election races. In the Senate, McCain continued his push for campaign finance reform. The question of whether McCain would endorse Bush remained uncertain.

The events of South Carolina stayed with McCain. In an interview during this time, McCain would say of the rumor spreaders, "I believe that there is a special place in hell for people like those," and in another interview he called the rumor spreaders "the ugly underside of politics." McCain regretted some aspects of his own campaign there as well, in particular changing his stance on flying the Confederate flag at the state capitol from a "very offensive" "symbol of racism and slavery" to "a symbol of heritage". He would later write, "I feared that if I answered honestly, I could not win the South Carolina primary. So I chose to compromise my principles." He had done so woodenly, reading his revised statement from a piece of paper. According to one report, the South Carolina experience overall left McCain in a "very dark place."

McCain finally did announce he would campaign for Bush, in a joint appearance with him on May 9, but did not use the actual word "endorse" until reporters pressed him to do so. The Guardian characterized the endorsement as "tepid" and said that McCain "betrayed little outward enthusiasm" during the appearance, while The New York Times wrote that "there was a tight, grudging quality to the event," and that McCain had been "looking a bit like a teenager forced to attend a classical music concert." McCain also made it clear that he was not interested in a vice-presidential nomination.

When the 2000 Republican National Convention began in Philadelphia at the end of July, McCain took his Straight Talk Express to meet with his delegates and supporters before formally releasing them to Bush. There were tears from McCain, his wife Cindy, and some of the campaign staff and delegates. Many of McCain's supporters were vocally unhappy with his words of support for Bush, and the Times wrote that, "Politics as usual with its compromises, cruelties and emotional costs—caught up with Senator John McCain this weekend." McCain made a point of having Cindy McCain head the Arizona delegation at the convention, not his antagonist Governor Hull. On August 1, the second night of the convention, McCain delivered a speech in praise of Bush, in particular trying to solidify Bush's national security and foreign policy credentials. In it, McCain connected his family to Bush's, making reference to former President George H. W. Bush's combat service as a naval aviator in the Pacific Theater of World War II under Admiral John S. McCain, Sr., McCain's grandfather. He said directly of the nominee, "I support him. I am grateful to him. And I am proud of him." The Almanac of American Politics called it "a moving, elegiac speech that ended as if in a minor key."

McCain's plans to campaign for Bush in fall 2000 were delayed later in August by a recurrence of melanoma. This Stage IIa instance on his temple required extensive surgery that removed the lesion, surrounding lymph nodes, and part of the parotid gland. The final pathology tests showed that the melanoma had not spread, and his prognosis was good, but McCain was left with cosmetic aftereffects including a puffy cheek and a scar down his neck.

McCain did join Bush for a few days of appearances in late October, emphasizing, in the wake of the October 12 USS Cole bombing, his belief that Bush was a better choice than Democratic Party nominee Al Gore to deal with international security threats. Bush aide Scott McClellan later described the joint appearances by saying, "The tension was palpable. The two were cordial, but McCain would get that forced smile on his face whenever they were together." McCain also campaigned for about forty Republican House of Representatives candidates, and was credited by National Republican Congressional Committee chair Tom Davis with keeping the House in Republican hands. McCain would state that he voted for Bush on November 7 (although years later several witnesses would relate that McCain and his wife Cindy had both said at a dinner party that they had not). When the November presidential election continued on in indecision during the Florida election dispute, McCain stayed generally quiet in an atmosphere of extreme partisanship, though he did appear on CBS' Face the Nation to say, "I think the nation is growing a little weary of this. We're not in a constitutional crisis, but the American people are growing weary, and whoever wins is having a rapidly diminishing mandate, to say the least." Once Bush was declared the winner and inaugurated in January 2001, McCain's battles with him would resume, with a significant amount of lingering bitterness between the two men and their staffs over what had transpired during the course of 2000.

== Aftermath ==
=== South Carolina investigated and revisited ===
While South Carolina was known for legendary hard-knuckled political consultant Lee Atwater and rough elections, this had been rougher than most. Michael Graham, a native writer, radio host, and political operative, would say "I have worked on hundreds of campaigns in South Carolina, and I've never seen anything as ugly as that campaign." In subsequent years there would be persistent accounts trying to tie the anti-McCain smears to high levels of the Bush campaign: the 2003 book Bush's Brain would use it to build up their "evil genius" depiction of Bush chief strategist Karl Rove, while a 2008 NOW on PBS program showed a local political consultant stating that Warren Tompkins, a Lee Atwater protégé and then Bush chief strategist for the state, was responsible. In April 2004 National Review's Byron York would try to debunk many of the South Carolina smear reports as "unfounded legend." However, in November 2004, a 6,500-word investigative report by Richard Gooding for Vanity Fair provided evidence of the campaign's existence and scale based on 75 interviews and on-the-ground reporting. Gooding documented witnesses who reported receiving identical push-poll scripts that disrupted legitimate polling operations, and a local professor who located a physical call center used for the effort. Multiple witnesses described identical flyers distributed to church groups containing the smears with pictures of the McCain family. An email chain originating from Christian Fundamentalist Bob Jones University also spread the smears. Gooding concluded that while the Karl Rove-led campaign maintained plausible deniability, the tactics were openly acknowledged by local operatives and the campaign made no effort to stop them. McCain's campaign manager said in 2004 they never found out where the smear attacks came from, while McCain himself never doubted their existence.

When McCain ran for president again in 2008, South Carolina again proved crucial, in his battle with former Governors Mitt Romney and Mike Huckabee and former Senator Fred Thompson. This time, McCain had the support of much of the state Republican establishment (although Rush Limbaugh and other talk radio figures were still lambasting him), and aggressively moved to thwart any smear campaign before it got started. McCain won the primary on January 19, 2008; in his victory remarks to supporters that evening, he said, "It took us awhile, but what's eight years among friends?" The New York Times described McCain's win as "exorcising the ghosts of the attack-filled primary here that derailed his presidential hopes eight years ago."

=== Legacy ===
The 2000 campaign became central to McCain's public image for the rest of his career. Obituaries and retrospectives after his death in 2018 repeatedly treated it as the clearest expression of his reformist, media-friendly, anti-establishment persona, while some commentators portrayed it as a "road not taken" for the Republican Party before its later shift toward harder-edged populism.

The bid also helped nationalize McCain's long-running campaign-finance effort, which would culminate in the Bipartisan Campaign Reform Act of 2002, commonly known as McCain–Feingold.

== Primary campaign results ==
Total popular votes in Republican 2000 primaries:

- George W. Bush – 12,034,676 (62.0%)
- John McCain – 6,061,332 (31.2%)
- Alan Keyes – 985,819 (5.1%)
- Steve Forbes – 171,860 (0.9%)
- Unpledged – 61,246 (0.3%)
- Gary Bauer – 60,709 (0.3%)
- Orrin Hatch – 15,958 (0.1%)

Key states:

- Feb 1 New Hampshire primary: McCain 115,606 (48.5%), Bush 72,330 (30.4%), Forbes 30,166 (12.7%), Keyes 15,179 (6.4%)
- Feb 19 South Carolina primary: Bush 305,998 (53.4%), McCain 239,964 (41.9%), Keyes 25,996 (4.5%)
- Feb 22 Arizona primary: McCain 193,708 (60.0%), Bush 115,115 (35.7%), Keyes 11,500 (3.6%)
- Feb 22 Michigan primary: McCain 650,805 (51.0%), Bush 549,665 (43.1%), Keyes 59,032 (4.6%)
- Feb 29 Virginia primary: Bush 350,588 (52.8%), McCain 291,488 (43.9%), Keyes 20,356 (3.1%)
- Feb 29 Washington primary: Bush 284,053 (57.8%), McCain 191,101 (38.9%), Keyes 11,753 (2.4%)
- Mar 7 California primary: Bush 1,725,162 (60.6%), McCain 988,706 (34.7%), Keyes 112,747 (4.0%)
- Mar 7 New York primary: Bush 1,102,850 (51.0%), McCain 937,655 (43.4%), Keyes 71,196 (3.3%), Forbes 49,817 (2.3%)
- Mar 7 Ohio primary: Bush 810,369 (58.0%), McCain 516,790 (37.0%), Keyes 55,266 (4.0%)
- Mar 7 Georgia primary: Bush 430,480 (66.9%), McCain 179,046 (27.8%), Keyes 29,640 (4.6%)
- Mar 7 Missouri primary: Bush 275,366 (57.9%), McCain 167,831 (35.3%), Keyes 27,282 (5.7%)
- Mar 7 Maryland primary: Bush 211,439 (56.2%), McCain 135,981 (36.2%), Keyes 25,020 (6.7%)
- Mar 7 Maine primary: Bush 49,308 (51.0%), McCain 42,510 (44.0%), Keyes 2,989 (3.1%), Uncommitted 1,038 (1.1%)
- Mar 7 Massachusetts primary: McCain 325,297 (64.7%), Bush 159,826 (31.8%), Keyes 12,656 (2.5%)
- Mar 7 Vermont primary: McCain 49,045 (60.3%), Bush 28,741 (35.3%), Keyes 2,164 (2.7%)
- Mar 7 Rhode Island primary: McCain 21,754 (60.2%), Bush 13,170 (36.4%), Keyes 923 (2.6%)
- Mar 7 Connecticut primary: McCain 87,176 (48.7%), Bush 82,881 (46.3%), Keyes 5,913 (3.3%)
