= Mike Murphy (political consultant) =

American political consultant, writer, and producer (born 1962)

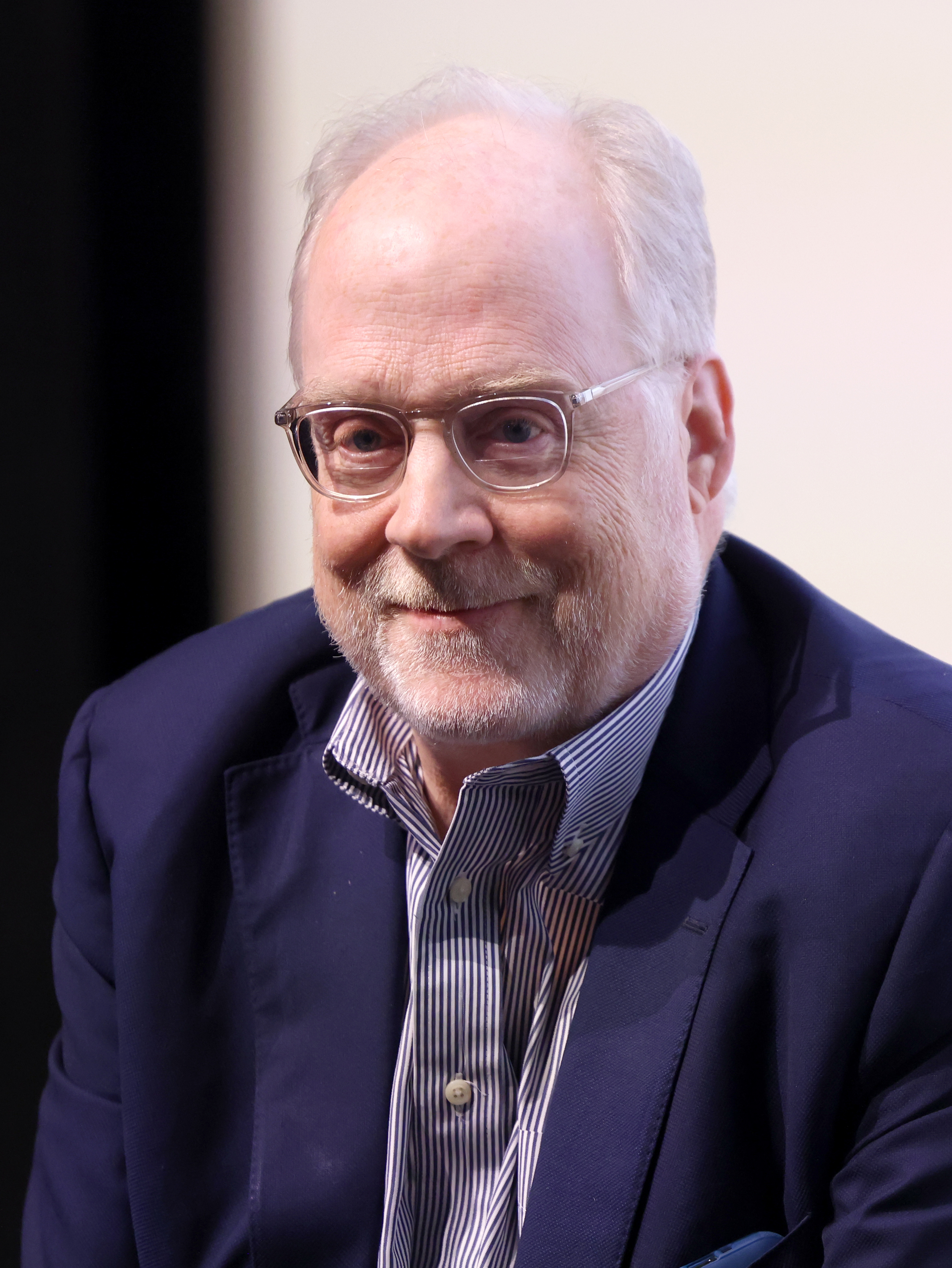
- Murphy in 2026
- Born: Michael Ellis Murphy; June 4, 1962 (age 64); Detroit, Michigan, U.S.
- Education: Georgetown University
- Occupation: Political consultant
- Political party: Republican
- Spouse: Tiffany Daniel (m. 2011)
- Children: 1
- Website: Official website

Michael Ellis Murphy (born June 4, 1962) is a Republican political consultant, entertainment industry writer, and producer. He advised Republicans including John McCain, Jeb Bush, David Dreier, John Engler, Tommy Thompson, Spencer Abraham, Christine Whitman, Lamar Alexander, Meg Whitman, and Arnold Schwarzenegger. Until January 2006, he was an adviser to Republican Mitt Romney. Murphy resigned his position with Romney when his former client John McCain made it clear he would also pursue the Republican presidential nomination in 2008; Murphy decided to be neutral in the contest between them. Murphy is a vocal Republican critic of President Donald Trump. He endorsed Democratic candidate Joe Biden in the 2020 U.S. Presidential election.

== Early life and education ==
Murphy was born in Detroit, Michigan, in 1962, but was raised in Grosse Pointe, a suburb of Detroit. He is of Irish, Austrian, and Alsatian descent. He studied Russian and International Relations while attending Georgetown University's School of Foreign Service, dropping out his senior year. He served as a founding board member of the University of Chicago Institute of Politics and is currently Co-Director of the Center for the Political Future at the University of Southern California and was a Senior Fellow at Harvard's Belfer Center for Science and International Affairs.

== Career ==
=== Political commentary ===
Murphy serves as a commentator on NBC's Meet the Press and political programs. Murphy wrote the "Murphy's Law" column for TIME Magazine during the 2008 election cycle. In August 2012, National Journal named Murphy one of "Ten Republicans to follow on Twitter".

In 2003, Murphy visited a Georgian museum dedicated to Joseph Stalin and recounted his experience.

In December 2006, he called on President George W. Bush to escalate the Iraq War and to establish a bipartisan war council made up of Democrats and Republicans.

On September 3, 2008, after a segment on NBC, Murphy was recorded, along with conservative commentator Peggy Noonan and then NBC reporter Chuck Todd, giving critical analysis about Republican vice-presidential candidate Sarah Palin. All three were apparently unaware that their microphones were still live. In the captured audio, Murphy describes the pick of Palin as "cynical". Murphy had been publicly critical of the strategy of the Palin choice, saying her appeal was mostly limited to the Republican base.

In 2013, Murphy was a signatory to an amicus curiae brief submitted to the Supreme Court in support of same-sex marriage during the Hollingsworth v. Perry case.

During the 2016 election, Murphy created and hosted the Radio Free GOP podcast, consistently rated as one of the most popular political podcasts on iTunes.

In June 2019, Murphy launched the "Hacks on Tap" podcast with David Axelrod, focusing on developments in the 2020 Election. Former White House Press Secretary Robert Gibbs also collaborates on the podcast.

Murphy is a strategic advisor to Republican Voters Against Trump, a project of Defending Democracy Together, launched in May 2020.

Murphy endorsed Democratic presidential nominee Kamala Harris in the 2024 presidential election.

=== Revolution Agency ===
In 1986, Murphy teamed with close friend Alex Castellanos to form Murphy & Castellanos. In 1989, he established MPGH, which he sold eleven years later to Interpublic. Murphy is currently senior partner at Revolution Agency, a political advertising, advocacy, public affairs and political consulting firm in Washington, D.C. At Revolution, Murphy advises a variety of Fortune 500 companies, hedge funds, interest groups, political action committees and trade associations.

=== Right to Rise PAC ===
In the 2016 election cycle, Murphy served as chief strategist for Right to Rise, a PAC supporting Jeb Bush's U.S. presidential campaign. The PAC raised over 100 million dollars, a record in primary PAC fundraising. Murphy set the PAC's strategy based on the assumption that Trump's campaign would inevitably fail, and so the PAC would instead concentrate on defeating other GOP candidates, "candidates in our lane that we can overcome." Right to Rise spent over $118 million over the course of the 2016 Republican presidential primary. Despite this sum, Jeb Bush only won a total of 4 Republican delegates and received a total 94,699 votes. A staggering $1,246.05 per vote. On February 20, 2016, after a series of disappointing results in the Republican primaries, Bush announced that he was suspending his campaign.

At that point Right to Rise refunded more than 12 million dollars to its donors, the only candidate PAC in the 2016 to manage its funds in a way to make possible a major refund of unspent contributions. Murphy refused to endorse or vote for Donald Trump after the latter's nomination as the Republican Party's candidate for the U.S. presidency, citing Trump's history of making racially charged remarks as a prohibiting factor.

== Personal life ==
Murphy is a Republican and lives with his wife Tiffany Daniel, a Democrat whom he married in 2011, in Hancock Park, California and who also works as a writer and producer in the entertainment industry. He has a daughter as well as a brother who lives in Georgia.
