= Republican reactions to Donald Trump's claims of 2020 election fraud =

Members of the United States Republican Party have reacted differently to Republican president Donald Trump's false claims of fraud in the 2020 United States presidential election, with many publicly supporting them, many remaining silent, and a few publicly denouncing them. Trump falsely claimed to have won the election, and made many claims of election fraud. By December 11, 2020, 126 out of 196 Republican members of the House backed a lawsuit filed in the United States Supreme Court supported by nineteen Republican state attorneys general seeking to subvert the election and overturn the election results. The Trump campaign hired the Berkeley Research Group to investigate whether there had been voter fraud. The researchers found nothing, and the consultancy reported this to Trump and his chief of staff Mark Meadows on a conference call in the final days of the year, before the attack on the Capitol.

Multiple polls for months after the election found that majorities of Republicans believed the election was fraudulent and stolen and that Trump was the "true" president. By February 2021, drawing on the false allegations of voting fraud and a stolen election, Republican state legislatures had begun to implement new laws and rules to restrict voting access in ways that would favor Republican candidates. In Arizona, the Republican-controlled government proceeded with legislation to allow the state attorney general, then a Republican, to intervene in the voting certification process managed by the secretary of state, currently a Democrat. Republican lawmakers and candidates in several states sought to seize control of the administrative management of elections.

By December 30, 2020, Republican members of the House and Senate indicated their intent to object to the congressional certification of Electoral College results, to force both chambers to debate and vote on whether to accept the results. Mike Pence, who as vice president would preside over the proceedings, signaled his endorsement of the effort, stating on January 4, "I promise you, come this Wednesday, we will have our day in Congress." Trump and some supporters promoted a "Pence card" theory that the vice president has the authority to reject certified results. However, Pence later reversed his endorsement of the effort, saying in a letter he would not reject certified results. In the early hours of January 7, 2021, Pence (while performing his duties as President of the Senate, during the counting of electoral votes) conceded that Joe Biden and Kamala Harris had won. On the evening of January 7, 2021, Trump tweeted a video in which he agreed to a peaceful transition on January 20.

The insistence by Trump and his supporters through 2023 that the election had been stolen from him by fraud came to be characterized as an implementation of "the big lie", leading to an election denial movement. It was used by Republicans to justify efforts to impose new voting restrictions and to take control of the administrative management of elections at the state and local level.

== Timeline ==
=== Summary ===
From six months before, during, and after the 2020 United States elections, most notably during a speech held late on November 5, President Donald Trump, who was running for re-election on the Republican Party ticket, suggested and claimed that large-scale electoral fraud would happen, was happening, or had happened, to the effect that it would make him lose his presidential re-election. In the days after Election Day (November 3, 2020), Trump also demanded that the vote counting be stopped in some swing states (Pennsylvania, Georgia, and North Carolina), where he was slowly losing his lead to Democratic presidential candidate Joe Biden, until Republican observers could meaningfully observe and challenge the vote counting process. Concurrently, Trump demanded that the vote counting be continued in the swing state of Arizona, where he was catching up on Biden. Several prominent members of his Republican Party, including recently elected or former officials, denounced Trump's claims of election fraud before, during, and after the 2020 United States elections as unsubstantiated, baseless or without evidence, as well as damaging to the election process, undermining democracy and dangerous to political stability. In one case, a former Republican member of the U.S. House of Representatives referred to the totality of Trump's actions as an attempted coup d'état. In 2021, The Republican Accountability Project estimated that 6% of national Republican politicians consistently stood-up for democracy.

=== Before Election Day ===
Months before Election Day, Democrats regularly condemned President Trump's suggestions that widespread electoral fraud would occur (especially through the use of mail-in ballots, a claim Trump first made on April 7, 2020), but Republicans rarely did. Attempts by Politico to obtain comments from prominent Republicans on the issue mostly failed; Miles Taylor (former chief of staff of the Department of Homeland Security and author of "I Am Part of the Resistance Inside the Trump Administration") and Michael Steele (former chairman of the Republican National Committee) were among the few they could find expressing serious concerns about Trump's comments. Politico stated on the morning of November 3 that "[m]any Republicans insist they are disgusted by Trump's threats, they just aren't willing to say so publicly."

=== November 4: Counting transparency ===
After Election Day (November 3, 2020), in the afternoon of November 4, the Trump campaign sued Michigan and Pennsylvania, alleging that they were not being given proper access to monitor the vote counting process, and demanded the counting stop. The Trump team declared that they had already won the state of Pennsylvania at a moment when Trump was leading by 320,000 votes, but only 85% of the votes had been counted, and it was known that the vote counting in the city of Philadelphia could still tip the balance in favor of Biden. Eric Trump alleged that "the Democrats" would try to "cheat in Pennsylvania." However, Philadelphia City Commissioner Al Schmidt, who oversaw the city's counting and was himself a Republican, rejected claims that the process lacked transparency, as observers were able to see everything that was happening in the counting hall.

=== November 5: Trump speech alleging electoral fraud ===
Donald Trump's November 5 speech alleging large-scale electoral fraud is at the core of the controversy.

According to CNBC, there was mostly silence within the Republican Party shortly after Trump's speech from the White House late at night on November 5. Rick Santorum, Ben Sasse, Mitt Romney, Larry Hogan, and Chris Christie were among the first Republicans to criticize the President's remarks as indefensible. Combined with a statement from Nikki Haley that some deemed to concede Trump's defeat, several Republicans, including Trump's sons Donald Trump Jr. and Eric Trump, rebuked other Republicans for staying silent and not supporting the President's allegations of electoral fraud. According to a Reuters/Ipsos poll conducted on November 5, only about 30% of Republican Americans believed that Trump had won the election; the vast majority of Americans, including most Republicans, believed Biden had.

=== November 6: Critics and loyalists ===
Some Trump loyalists such as Lindsey Graham, Ted Cruz, Tom Cotton and Kevin McCarthy endorsed the false claims that Trump had actually won the election and that there was large-scale fraud, and called on Republicans to stay united behind Trump. Over 20 other leading Republicans denounced Trump's accusations of voter fraud on November 6. Some observers concluded that statements denouncing or supporting Trump's claims were also part of a conflict inside the Republican Party over who should be their nominee for the 2024 presidential election, and whether to continue Trumpist politics. In March 2021, McCarthy denied he had supported Trump's false claims of election fraud, though he had supported Texas v. Pennsylvania that sought to overturn voting results in four states and voted in favor of a House resolution to overturn voting results in two states.

=== November 7: Several Republicans congratulate Biden while most refuse ===
On November 7, most major American news networks called the election a victory for Biden when vote-counting in Pennsylvania and Nevada reached the point where he would certainly receive the 270 electors' votes needed for the presidency. The Trump campaign refused to concede defeat and instead asserted that "the election was far from over." Several leading Republicans, including former 2012 Republican presidential candidate Mitt Romney, Larry Hogan, John Kasich, Phil Scott, Adam Kinzinger, Will Hurd, Paul Mitchell, Fred Upton, Lamar Alexander, Tom Reed, and Jeb Bush, proceeded to congratulate Biden as the new President-elect (and Kamala Harris as Vice President-elect) of the United States; others such as Josh Hawley and Paul Gosar insisted that the election was not over yet until "all lawful votes have been counted, recounts finished, and allegations of fraud addressed."

Just before the media called the election, re-elected Texas Congressman Dan Crenshaw tweeted "If Trump loses, he loses. It was never an impossible outcome and we must accept the final results when it is over," to which newly elected Georgia Congresswoman Marjorie Taylor Greene (a QAnon conspiracy theory supporter) responded, "The time to STAND UP for (President Donald Trump) is RIGHT NOW. Republicans can't back down." Crenshaw criticized her for trying to "talk tough" and said: "You're a member of Congress now, Marjorie. Start acting like one," while stressing that any irregularity should be addressed.

=== November 8: George W. Bush congratulates Biden and Harris ===
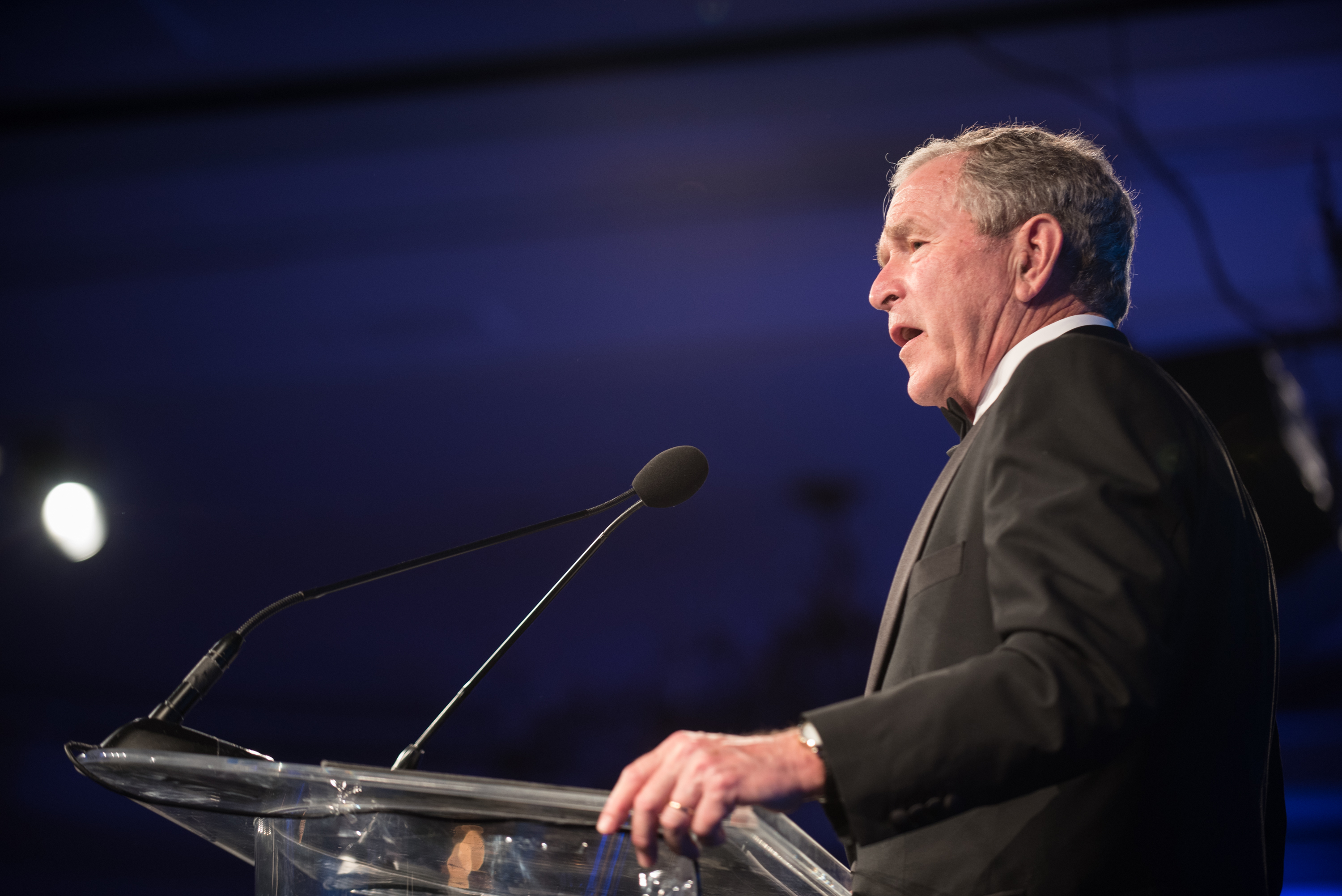
George W. Bush: "(...) this election was fundamentally fair, its integrity will be upheld, and its outcome is clear."

On November 8, former president George W. Bush (2001–2009), the previous Republican president, congratulated President-elect Joe Biden and Vice President-elect Kamala Harris by phone, and said in a statement: "The American people can have confidence that this election was fundamentally fair, its integrity will be upheld, and its outcome is clear." He further stated: "The President-elect reiterated that while he ran as a Democrat, he will govern for all Americans. I offered him the same thing I offered presidents Trump and Obama: my prayers for his success, and my pledge to help in any way I can." While congratulating Trump "on a hard-fought campaign" and saying he "has the right to request recounts and pursue legal challenges," Bush stated the election's outcome was clearly in Biden's favor. According to Forbes, "most Trump allies and congressional Republicans" had by then either stayed silent or explicitly refused to congratulate Biden and Harris, but the number of Republicans who did was growing. After Bush's declaration, Trump ally Chris Christie stepped up the pressure on Trump to provide evidence of electoral fraud if he wanted Republicans to support his cause: "If your basis for not conceding is [because] there was voter fraud, then show us. Because if you don't show us, we can't do this. We can't back you blindly without evidence." CNN claimed two sources had said Trump's son-in-law and Director of the Office of American Innovation Jared Kushner had urged the President to accept the loss, while a third, separate source alleged that First Lady Melania Trump had tried to convince her husband as well. Roy Blunt repeated his earlier statement that Trump had been making baseless claims and that "it's time for the president's lawyers to present the facts," but when asked by ABC's George Stephanopoulos, he refused to acknowledge for the time being that Biden had won; Pat Toomey took a similar but softer stance. Kristi Noem, on the other hand, pushed the narrative of widespread fraud, but was unable to present evidence when pressed by Stephanopoulos.

=== November 9: Trump campaign announces legal challenges ===
At the Four Seasons Total Landscaping press conference, the Trump campaign team had announced it would formally present several legal challenges against the election process and results on Monday, November 9, refusing to concede the Biden/Harris victory. Speaking on the condition of anonymity to the Associated Press, senior officials, campaign aides and allies said that "[t]he strategy to wage a legal fight against the votes tallied for Biden in Pennsylvania and other places is more to provide Trump with an off-ramp for a loss he can't quite grasp and less about changing the election's outcome." Some of them even had "deep reservations about the president's attempts to undermine faith in the vote." Similarly, The Washington Post reported on Monday that "[b]ehind the scenes, Trump advisers and allies are increasingly resigned to a Biden victory, according to people familiar with internal discussions, who, like others interviewed for this report, spoke on the condition of anonymity to share private conversations."

In response, Senate Majority Leader Mitch McConnell stated that "President Trump is 100% within his rights to look into allegations of irregularities and weigh his legal options." Texas senator John Cornyn and Iowa senator Chuck Grassley were among the Republicans who said that they had not yet seen any evidence of widespread voting fraud that could change the election, while saying the President had the right to legally investigate allegations of fraud. Close Trump ally Graham also referred to minor incidents that he admitted would not yet change the election result, and said he would accept a loss in the courts.

That same day, ABC News noted that actually very few members of the Trump administration and White House staff itself had so far explicitly supported Trump's claims of electoral fraud, or asserted that he won the election; Vice President Mike Pence only went so far as tweeting he stood by President Trump in saying that every legal vote should be counted, and otherwise remained silent. Lieutenant Governor Geoff Duncan of the key swing state of Georgia stated: "We've not had any sort of credible incidents [of widespread systemic voter fraud or irregularities] raised to our level yet." At a press conference, White House press secretary Kayleigh McEnany accused Democrats of encouraging fraud and illegal voting. Notably, Fox News decided to cut away during her speech because host Neil Cavuto found it irresponsible to continue broadcasting such "an explosive charge." Previously, Fox News had continuously aired most of President Trump's press conferences and rallies, regardless of the false claims he made during his speeches.

In a highly contentious move, U.S. Attorney General William Barr, who had previously supported Trump's unfounded claims about voter fraud, authorized the investigation of alleged voting irregularities before the states had certified the election results, prompting Richard Pilger, director of the elections crimes branch in the Justice Department, to resign in protest. Pilger stated that Barr's action was "abrogating the forty-year-old Non-Interference Policy for ballot fraud investigations in the period prior to elections becoming certified and uncontested."

Meanwhile, Republican senators David Perdue and Kelly Loeffler from Georgia demanded Georgia Secretary of State Brad Raffensperger to resign for "[failing] to deliver honest and transparent elections" after his voting system manager, Gabriel Sterling (a lifelong Republican), called the claims of electoral fraud "hoaxes and nonsense," "fake news" and "disinformation" in a Monday morning press conference, but Raffensperger (also a Republican) rejected the demand outright, adding that any incidents of voter fraud were unlikely to tip the balance of Biden's lead of more than 12,000 votes (0.25%) towards Trump for Georgia's 16 electors. He called Perdue and Loeffler's claim of lack of transparency "laughable."

=== November 10: Pompeo rejects Biden's victory while other Republicans privately acknowledge it ===
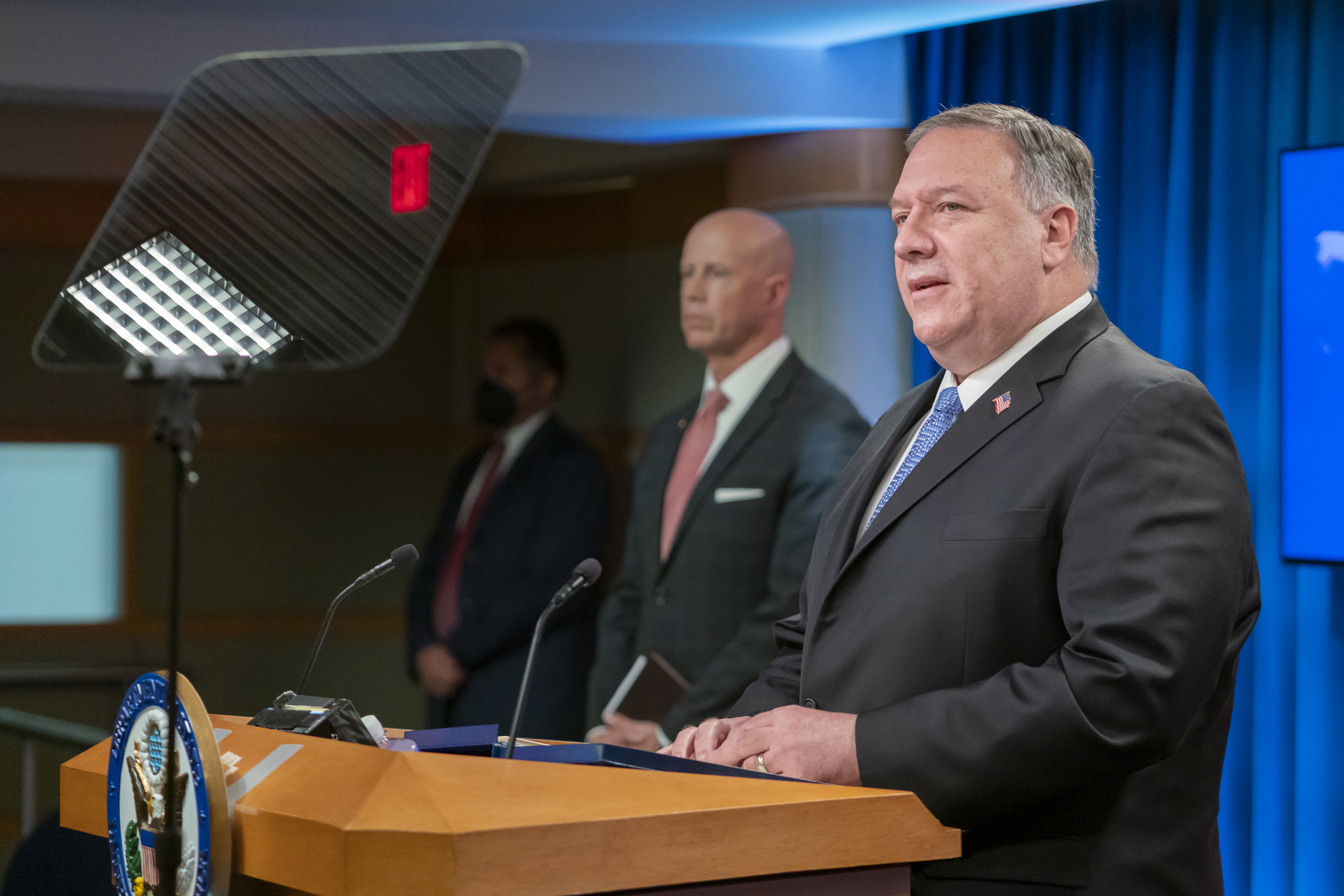
Mike Pompeo: "There will be a smooth transition to a second Trump administration."

On November 10, Secretary of State Mike Pompeo sparked outrage among diplomats when he told journalists during a press conference that there would be a "smooth transition to a second Trump administration," because he was confident that the vote counting would still result in a Trump victory. John Bolton, National Security Advisor in the Trump administration from 2018 to 2019, who had already denounced Trump's fraud claims days earlier, was highly critical of Pompeo's remarks, saying he had "eviscerated his credibility" and was "delusional." Meanwhile, Democratic senator Chris Coons from Delaware told CNN that several Republican senators had privately acknowledged President-elect Joe Biden's victory to him in phone calls, asking him "to convey their well-wishes to the President-elect," but they were not yet willing to do so publicly themselves. At that point, four Republican senators had publicly recognized Biden, and Coons expected others to follow that week.

An inquiry from The New York Times showed that throughout the country, election officials representing both parties reported no evidence of significant voter fraud, even though some Republican candidates running for office were casting doubt on the results without proof. Republican officials criticized unsupported allegations, with Ohio Secretary of State Frank LaRose stating: "There's a great human capacity for inventing things that aren't true about elections. The conspiracy theories and rumors and all those things run rampant." Kansas Republican secretary of state Scott Schwab wrote in an email: "Kansas did not experience any widespread, systematic issues with voter fraud, intimidation, irregularities or voting problems." Republican Washington Secretary of State Kim Wyman determined the election was free of fraud. Her assessment was rebuked by Republican candidate Loren Culp, who lost his gubernatorial race against Democrat Jay Inslee by a large margin of 14%, leading Wyman to say: "It's just throwing grass at the fence at this point, see what sticks." Republican Montana Secretary of State Corey Stapleton tweeted: "I have supported you, Mr. President. @realDonaldTrump accomplished some incredible things during your time in office! But that time is now over! Tip your hat, bite your lip, and congratulate @JoeBiden."

=== November 11: Senior Republicans call on Trump to concede ===
On November 11, Arizona attorney general Mark Brnovich, a Republican, stated that he had not found any evidence of significant fraud that could change the outcome of that state's result. He said it was "very, highly unlikely" that Trump would receive enough votes from the last remaining uncounted ballots to beat Biden's 13,000 vote lead, and thus obtain Arizona's 11 electors. Even without these, Biden would still have 279 electors, enough to gain the presidency with a large margin. Meanwhile, pressure was mounting on Trump to concede defeat: most foreign heads of state or government had already congratulated President-elect Biden, who a day earlier had labeled Trump's refusal to concede "an embarrassment." Senior Republicans who had already acknowledged the Democratic nominee's victory were publicly calling on the President to do the same, with former Defense Secretary and former US Senator from Maine William Cohen describing Trump's behavior as "more akin to a dictatorship than a democracy." Former White House Chief of Staff Andrew Card said: "I think it's hyperbole beyond expectation or credibility to say that somebody 'stole the election'; they didn't." He said he was addressing the president, but also trying to give "Republicans who know this, but are afraid to say it, permission to say it," and urged people close to the President to "tell him the truth, polish our democracy, and polish his legacy," "recognize reality," and begin the transition to prevent security risks.

Massachusetts governor Charlie Baker commented: "I'm dismayed to hear the baseless claims from the president, from his team, and from many other elected Republican officials in Washington. I can't think of a worse time to stall a transition than amid a deadly pandemic." Maryland governor Larry Hogan added: "Most people realize that this election is over. It's really dangerous, I think, in the middle of this pandemic, this economic collapse, people dying across the country, to not know if we're going to have a transition." An editorial in the Las Vegas Review-Journal, owned by Republican megadonor Sheldon Adelson who had supported the Trump campaign with over 75 million dollars, wrote: "The president does a disservice to his more rabid supporters by insisting that he would have won the Nov 3 election absent voter fraud. That's simply false."

Senate Ethics Committee Chair James Lankford, a Republican senator from Oklahoma, demanded the Trump administration to give President-elect Biden and Vice President-elect Harris access to the President's Daily Brief, the daily presidential intelligence briefings on national security issues. Lankford took the pragmatic position of not yet acknowledging Biden and Harris as elects while Trump's legal challenges were ongoing, but recognized they would form the next administration if the lawsuits failed, and said they needed to be informed about the country's pressing security issues to be prepared before taking office. This practice during the presidential lame duck period was long established, even during the contested 2000 presidential election, Lankford argued, warning he would intervene if the Trump administration would not grant Biden/Harris access by the end of the week.

=== November 12: "Most secure election in American history" ===
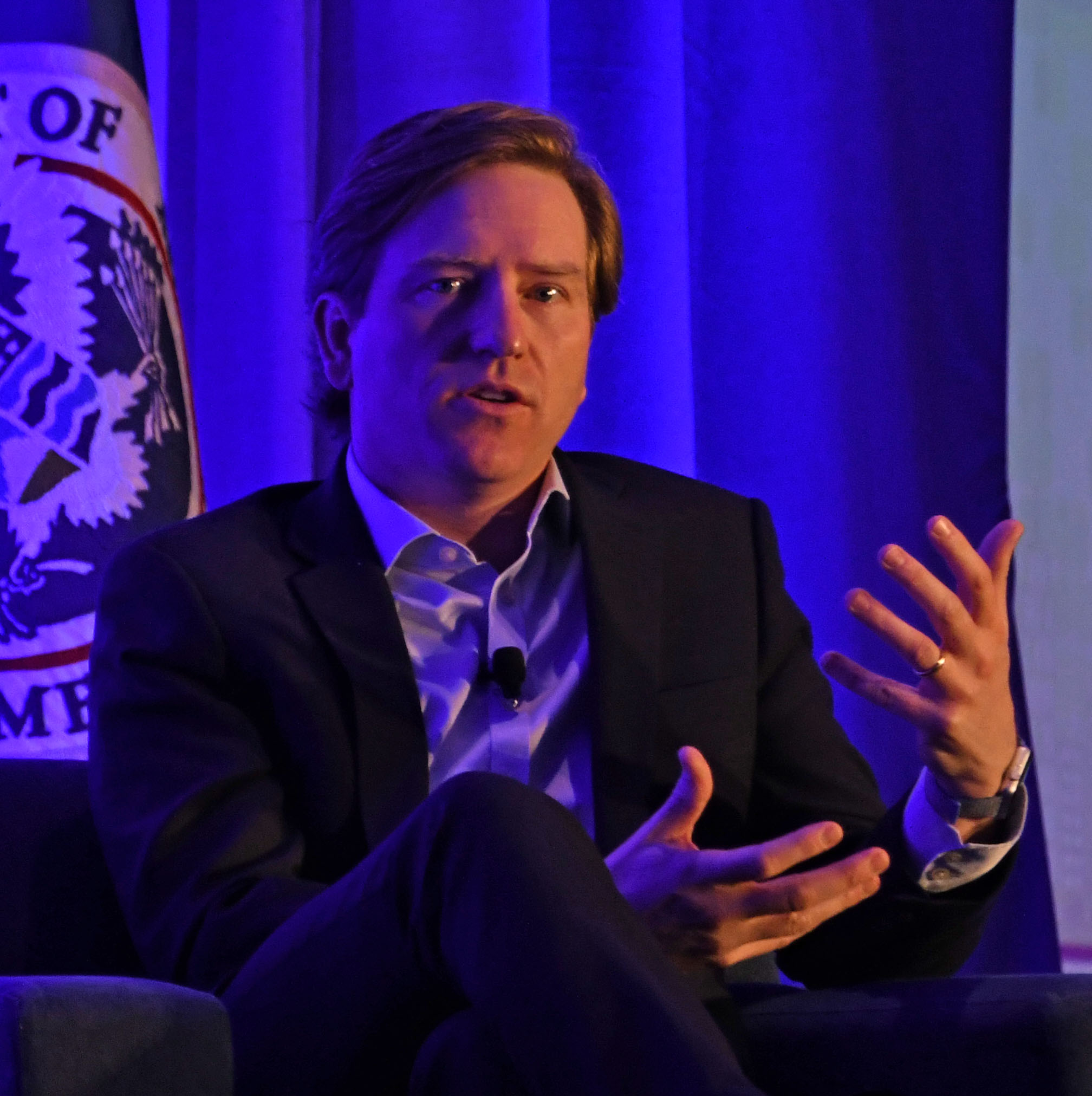
Chris Krebs: "[Don't share] baseless claims about voting machines, even if they're made by the president." Trump fired Krebs days later.

On November 12, the Cybersecurity and Infrastructure Security Agency (CISA), part of the Department of Homeland Security, published a statement saying "The November 3 election was the most secure in American history," and that it had found "no evidence that any voting system deleted or lost votes, changed votes, or was in any way compromised." It was the first time that an entire agency – one which Trump had in fact created in 2018 – within the Trump administration contradicted the President's claims of widespread fraud and irregularities.

The Trump-appointed Director of CISA, Christopher C. Krebs, had already been at odds with President Trump over creating a website that sought to debunk election-related disinformation, while a lot of such disinformation was being spread by Trump himself and other Republican Party leaders. He therefore expected to be fired by the President soon for disloyalty, as many other officials had been in preceding days due to conflicts with Trump over the election and other issues. Nevertheless, he persisted in leading his agency's efforts in combating what he saw as dangerous nonsense, hoaxes and conspiracy theories such as "wild and baseless claims about voting machines, even if they're made by the president." Trump fired Krebs on November 17.

New Hampshire Governor Chris Sununu insisted there was no fraud in his state and congratulated Biden as President-elect, bringing the number of Republican governors denouncing Trump's claims to 5 out of 26. Ohio Governor Mike DeWine then did the same, becoming the 6th. That same day, 161 former national security officials, who served in Democratic or Republican administrations (including the Trump administration), signed a letter urging the General Services Administration (GSA) to recognize Joe Biden as president-elect, as further delaying the acknowledgement posed "serious risk to national security."

=== November 13: Trump suffers legal setbacks ===
On November 13, the Trump campaign suffered three defeats in Arizona, Michigan and Pennsylvania related to his challenges against the electoral process. Spokesperson Tim Murtaugh repeated claims about voting machine irregularities in Maricopa County, but the Trump team dropped its lawsuit because Biden's overall lead in Arizona was too large for the disputed ballots to make a difference. That same day, several law firms including Porter Wright Morris & Arthur, Jones Day (which had supported Trump in over 20 cases in 4 years) and Snell & Wilmer that had been representing the Trump campaign or the Republican Party in some of its legal complaints withdrew their support, commenting that the President's objections were pointless, and they did not wish to legitimize his arguments anymore. Jones Day lawyer Parker A. Rider-Longmaid stated: "I believe the question is whether this firm should lend its prestige and credibility to the project of an administration bent on undermining our democracy and our rule of law." The Lincoln Project, a group of anti-Trump Republicans, had been publicly urging employees of Jones Day and Porter Wright to resign in protest in the preceding days. President Trump himself reportedly also came close to conceding defeat by admitting that he may not be leading the next administration, during an interview on the new COVID-19 surge, saying: "I will not go – this administration will not be going to a lockdown. Hopefully the – whatever happens in the future, who knows which administration will be. I guess time will tell. But I can tell you this administration will not go to a lockdown."

=== November 14: Trump criticizes Republican officials dismissing fraud ===
On November 14, President Trump vehemently criticized Georgia Secretary of State Brad Raffensperger for dismissing claims of fraud, labeling him "a so-called Republican (RINO)", accusing him of obstructing investigations into fraud, even though Raffensperger said the investigations were still ongoing "but we have not seen something widespread." In response to pressure to follow Trump's narrative, Raffensperger stated: "People are just going to have to accept the results. I'm a Republican. I believe in fair and secure elections." His comments were supported by Republican lieutenant governor Geoff Duncan. Trump also attacked Philadelphia City Commissioner Al Schmidt as a "so-called Republican (RINO)", alleging he "refused to look at a mountain of corruption & dishonesty." Schmidt had called some of Trump's claims "fantastical" and "completely ridiculous allegations that have no basis in fact at all." Similarly, Republican election officials in the Dauphin and Cumberland counties refuted presidential claims of voter fraud.

Meanwhile, Republican Kent County Clerk Lisa Posthumus Lyons rejected Trump's claims that the voting system was unreliable, saying it had been used before by the Michigan Republican Party; she added: "I am 100% confident in the results in Kent County, and I'm confident that our canvass, once its all concluded, will validate that." Barbara Cegavske, the Nevada Secretary of State and also a Republican, declared that "[m]any voter fraud complaints lack any evidence and are more complaints about process or policy."

=== November 15: Confusion about partial concession ===
On November 15, retweeting a Fox News video that claimed fraud, Trump wrote about Biden: "He won because the election was rigged," repeating a number of claims that have been generally dismissed as baseless. Nevertheless, several analysts and commentators regarded this statement as a partial concession or the start of a concession on the part of the incumbent president. While asserting Trump would remain influential within the Republican Party for some time, Republican Arkansas Governor Asa Hutchinson told NBC: "It was good actually to see President Trump tweet out that 'he won'. I think that's a start of an acknowledgment." Trump responded: "He only won in the eyes of the fake news media. I concede nothing!"

=== November 19: Biden/Harris host bipartisan governor conference ===
Sixteen days into Trump's refusal to concede, the Biden/Harris Transitional Team hosted a conference call on how to deal with COVID-19 with ten governors, five of whom were Republicans: Alabama Governor Kay Ivey, Arkansas Governor Asa Hutchinson, Maryland Governor Larry Hogan, Massachusetts Governor Charlie Baker, and Utah Governor Gary Herbert. President-elect Biden stressed the importance of bipartisanship, expressed hope for arriving at a consensus with "Republican colleagues," and criticized General Services Administrator Emily W. Murphy's decision to delay the transition process.

=== November 19–22: legal developments ===
The same day, Trump campaign attorneys Rudy Giuliani, Jenna Ellis, Joseph diGenova and Sidney Powell – who described themselves as Trump's "elite strike force team" – "spun a web of mistruths that made mention of the Clinton Foundation, liberal megadonor George Soros and the late Venezuelan strongman Hugo Chávez." Powell referred to an alleged pro-Biden election-rigging software within polling machines issued by Dominion Voting Systems. At no time did any of the lawyers give proof of their claims. Trump cable news loyalist Tucker Carlson singled out the conspiratorial claims made by Powell, who alleged that Venezuela, Cuba and unidentified communist interests had used a secret algorithm to hack into voting machines and commit fraud, noting that "what Powell was describing would amount to the single greatest crime in American history." He said Powell became "angry and told us to stop contacting her" when he asked for evidence of her claims. On November 22, the Trump campaign distanced themselves from Powell, with Ellis saying "Sidney Powell is practicing law on her own. She is not a member of the Trump Legal Team. She is also not a lawyer for the President in his personal capacity."

=== November 23: GSA ascertains Biden as apparent president-elect ===
General Services Administrator Emily Murphy formally sent the letter of ascertainment to Joe Biden on November 23. While Democrats and some Republicans had been pressuring her to make the ascertainment, and Trump loyalists not to do so, Murphy stated she made her own decision based on the official election results and developing circumstances of Trump's legal challenges: "Contrary to media reports and insinuations, my decision was not made out of fear or favoritism. Instead, I strongly believe that the statute requires that the GSA Administrator ascertain, not impose, the apparent president-elect." Due to the ascertainment, the Biden/Harris transition team obtained funding and permission to start working with Trump administration officials across federal agencies to prepare for the Biden administration's succession in January 2021. President Trump endorsed the GSA ascertainment "in the best interest of the Country," while vowing to continue his legal struggles, which several people close to Trump as well as external commentators interpreted as an indirect concession.

=== December 2: Most Republican members of Congress still side with Trump ===
Over three weeks after Biden's victory speech, most Republican members of Congress who commented on the presidential election still sided with Trump.

=== December 5: Few Republican members of Congress recognize Biden as the winner ===
Only 27 out of 249 Republicans in Congress had acknowledged Biden as the winner of the election.

=== December 8: Texas v. Pennsylvania; rejected resolution to declare Biden president-elect ===
Texas Attorney General Ken Paxton, sues the state of Pennsylvania (Texas v. Pennsylvania) alleging that election results from Georgia, Michigan, Pennsylvania, and Wisconsin were invalid. Within one day of Texas's filing, Trump, over 100 Republican Representatives, and 18 Republican state attorney generals filed motions to support the case. Republican members of state legislatures also supported the assertions.

During a meeting of the Joint Congressional Committee on Inaugural Ceremonies, Democrats proposed a resolution affirming Joe Biden to be president-elect, but Republicans voted it down. The vote was 3–3 along party lines.

=== December 14: Counterfeit electors ===
On Fox News, Stephen Miller stated that failed Trump electors would meet and cast a set of "alternative votes."

=== December 15: Electoral College votes to certify Biden's victory ===
After the electoral college vote to certify Biden's victory, more Republican senators begin to call Biden the president-elect. Senate Majority Leader Mitch McConnell extended his congratulations for the first time on December 15, referring to Biden and Harris as "President-elect" and "vice president-elect" and stating: "The electoral college has spoken." Nonetheless, in late December 2020, some Republican members in Congress were reported to be considering challenging the results of the electoral college vote on January 6, 2021, in an attempt to overturn Trump's loss to Biden.

=== December 28: Rep. Gohmert sues Vice President Pence ===
On December 28, 2020, Rep. Louis Gohmert (R-TX) challenged the constitutionality of the Electoral Count Act of 1887, claiming that the vice president should have the power and ability to unilaterally decide which slates of electoral votes get counted. Vice President Pence was named as the defendant in the lawsuit. Pence responded that he is "not the right person to sue," especially as Gohmert's lawsuit sought to expand Pence's powers, and he asked a judge to reject the lawsuit. The Justice Department argued on Pence's behalf that the lawsuit would make more sense if Congress were the defendant. Congressional lawyers supported Pence's position as well. The case was dismissed on January 1, 2021, for lack of both standing and jurisdiction. The plaintiffs immediately filed an appeal to the United States Court of Appeals for the Fifth Circuit on the Order of Dismissal and the accompanying Final Judgment, but the appeal was dismissed by a three-judge panel of the court on January 2.

=== December 30: Senator Hawley asserts state law violations ===
Senator Josh Hawley stated "some states, particularly Pennsylvania, failed to follow their own state election laws," though multiple courts had rejected such claims. Hawley repeated the false assertion about Pennsylvania in a February 2021 fundraising email, though the Pennsylvania Supreme Court had unanimously rejected the argument and the United States Supreme Court had declined to consider an appeal. Steve Scalise, the #2 Republican in the House, continued to make the false assertion as late as October 2021, stating during a television appearance, "Those states that didn't follow the law, are they gonna keep doing that in the future or are we gonna get back to the what the Constitution calls out for electing our leaders?"

=== January 2: Republican lawmakers object to the election outcome ===
On January 2, 2021, Vice President Pence reportedly welcomed Republican lawmakers' objections to the election outcome. (Senator Amy Klobuchar, the top Democrat of the committee with jurisdiction over federal elections, regarded the effort a "publicity stunt" that would fail eventually, and amounted to an attempt to "subvert the will of the voters.")

=== January 5: Senators reveal whether they will support the vote count ===
Ahead of the electoral vote count on January 6, a number of senators declared their intention to oppose or support counting the electoral votes as submitted by the states.

=== January 8: Nevada Republicans post manifesto predicting Trump will stay in office ===
The chairman of the Nye County Republican Party in Nevada posted a manifesto online that predicted two more weeks of national crisis with "high-profile arrests." It said that Trump would purge his Cabinet, replace his vice president, and ultimately remain in office. Michael Ahrens, RNC communications director, criticized it as sounding “deranged."

=== January 9: Arizona Republicans draft resolution to censure Cindy McCain ===
Arizona Republicans drafted a resolution to censure Cindy McCain (the widow of the late Republican senator John McCain) for supporting Joe Biden in the November election. RNC Chairwoman Ronna McDaniel disagreed with the effort, telling the Washington Post on January 11 that although "we are upset that a prominent Republican would support Joe Biden," nevertheless "the language in this resolution is abhorrent" and the Arizona Republican Party ought to disregard it if it is presented to them later in January. McCain, noting that the GOP had also censured her husband, shrugged it off on January 14: "I'm in good company."

=== January 12: Harvard Institute of Politics removes Rep. Elise Stefanik ===
The Harvard Institute of Politics senior advisory committee, expressing its disapproval of Representative Elise Stefanik's (R–N.Y.) false claims of election fraud, said she would no longer be allowed to participate on the committee.

=== January 17: Rep. Marjorie Taylor Greene suspended from Twitter for 12 hours ===
Twitter temporarily suspended the account of U.S. Representative Marjorie Taylor Greene, a Republican from Georgia, "for multiple violations of our civic integrity policy." Greene had tweeted that Americans should "mobilize...in opposition to these attacks on our liberties." The tweet was deleted, and the suspension was in effect for 12 hours.

=== February 1: Sen. McConnell criticizes Rep. Greene ===
Senate Minority Leader Mitch McConnell said, "Loony lies and conspiracy theories are cancer for the Republican Party and our country." Though he did not name Rep. Marjorie Taylor Greene, his comment was understood as a rebuke of her.

=== Subsequent events ===
CNN fact checker Daniel Dale reported that through June 9, 2021, Trump had issued 132 written statements since leaving office, of which "a third have included lies about the election"—more than any other subject.

To sow election doubt, Trump escalated use of "rigged election" and "election interference" statements in advance of the 2024 election compared to the previous two elections—the statements described as part of a "heads I win; tails you cheated" rhetorical strategy.

On April 10, 2021, the Nevada Republican Party voted 126–112 to censure the Nevada Secretary of State, Barbara Cegavske, a Republican, after her investigation concluded there had been no fraud in the state's 2020 election. Similarly, the Georgia Republican Convention censured Secretary of State Brad Raffensperger on June 5, 2021.

In April and May 2021, the Arizona Senate Republican Caucus was still conducting an audit of November 2020 election results in Maricopa County, even though the results were previously audited several times with the same outcome, and state officials had long since finalized certification. Republican state Sen. Paul Boyer said the audit "makes us look like idiots". The federal Department of Justice warned the methods being used might violate federal election and civil rights laws, and that the chain of custody had not been maintained. In response to a conspiracy theory promoted by a conservative radio show, ballots were examined for bamboo content (in a way experts said would not accurately detect bamboo) on the implausible theory that ballots were secretly imported from South Korea. Maricopa County sheriff Paul Penzone criticized as "mind-numbingly reckless and irresponsible" a demand by state Senate Republicans for routers, which he asserted could compromise confidential, sensitive and highly classified law enforcement data and equipment.

In a May post on his blog, Trump amplified a false assertion by Arizona senate president Karen Fann that an "entire database" of Maricopa County voter information had been deleted. Maricopa County recorder Stephen Richer, a Republican who oversees elections, tweeted that Trump's post was "unhinged," noting he was looking at the database on his computer at that moment. Richer added, "We can't indulge these insane lies any longer. As a party. As a state. As a country." The Maricopa county Twitter account later tweeted a lengthy thread with the hashtag #RealAuditorsDont, citing examples including "Release false 'conclusions' without understanding what they are looking at" and "Hire known conspiracy theorists."

During a May 17 meeting of the Maricopa County Board of Supervisors, Republicans who dominate the board sharply objected to the audit, with chairman Jack Sellers chastising Fann's "attempt at legitimatizing a grift disguised as an audit." That day, the county sent a twelve-page letter to dispute Fann's earlier allegations of wrongdoing by county officials, and Sellers stated the allegations were actually due to the incompetence of the auditors. Board members asked party and business leaders to speak out against the audit, noting they had received death threats.

While Senator Lindsey Graham said on May 6 that the party "can't grow without" Trump, on May 17 he said "I accept the results of the election," adding, "2020 is over for me."

Fulton County, Georgia, which includes most of Atlanta and is dominated by Democrats, was also the focus of election conspiracy theories. In May 2021, a county judge granted a request to unseal 147,000 mail-in ballots so they could be examined to determine if they are counterfeit. Georgia had already conducted three audits, including a hand recount, during the weeks after the election. The court case and ballot review were led by a man who has promoted various political conspiracy theories for decades. His effort has been supported by some leading Georgia Republicans, including former senator Kelly Loeffler.

The insistence by Trump and his supporters throughout 2021 that the election had been stolen from him by fraud came to be characterized as an implementation of "the big lie". Despite no evidence of election fraud surfacing after more than a year since the election, Trump and his supporters continued to insist he won and inverted the narrative to insist that saying he lost was the real big lie. Polls indicated a large majority of Republicans continued to agree that Trump's false assertions were valid, leading to efforts they characterized as bolstering "election integrity" to restrict voting and take control of the administrative management of elections. Trump ally Steve Bannon said in December 2021 that "we are going to take over the election apparatus." January 2022 analysis conducted by NPR found that at least fifteen Republicans who denied Biden's victory were candidates for secretary of state in the 2022 elections. Fascism scholar Timothy Snyder observed: "The lie is so big that it reorders the world. And so part of telling the big lie is that you immediately say it's the other side that tells the big lie. Sadly, but it's just a matter of record, all of that is in Mein Kampf."

In 2022, political comedian Jason Selvig interviewed JD Vance in a hallway. Selvig asked, "Did Donald Trump win the 2020 election?" Vance answered, "Yes." When Selvig repeated his question, Vance repeated his answer. In 2023, Vance became a U.S. senator, and in 2024, Trump named him as his running mate.

On January 18, 2023, new members were named to the House Oversight and Accountability Committee. Thirteen of the 15 new Republicans on the committee had "either voted to overturn the 2020 presidential election ... or are freshman members who have rejected or questioned the validity of President Joe Biden’s win", according to HuffPost. Similarly, three of the five Republicans named to the House Ethics Committee on January 31, 2023, had voted to overturn the 2020 election.

On December 13, 2024, just over a month after the 2024 United States presidential election, the Public Religion Research Institute published the results of a survey conducted shortly after that election, between November 8 and December 2. The survey focused primarily on the 2024 election but included questions about the claim that the 2020 election was stolen from Trump: 63 percent of Republicans and 31 percent of voters overall still agreed that the 2020 election had been stolen from Trump.

==== Indictment ====
On August 1, 2023, Trump was indicted by a federal grand jury on charges related to the election investigation. Charges were later dropped on November 25, 2024, a few weeks after Trump was elected president in the 2024 United States presidential election. In January 2025, the special counsel report was released, in which "the Office assessed that the admissible evidence was sufficient to obtain and sustain a conviction at trial."

On August 14, 2023, he was indicted by a Georgia grand jury on election racketeering charges.

== See also ==
- Big lie – Propaganda technique
- Attempts to overturn the 2020 United States presidential election
- Post-election lawsuits related to the 2020 U.S. presidential election
- Expulsion from the United States Congress
- List of Donald Trump 2020 presidential campaign endorsements
- List of federal political scandals in the United States
- List of former Trump administration officials who endorsed Joe Biden
- List of lawsuits involving Donald Trump
- List of Republicans who opposed the Donald Trump 2020 presidential campaign
- List of United States representatives expelled, censured, or reprimanded
- List of United States senators expelled or censured
- Stop the Steal
- Texas v. Pennsylvania
- Sedition Caucus
- Republican efforts to make voting laws more restrictive following the 2020 presidential election
