= Republican Political Alliance for Integrity and Reform =

United States political group

The Republican Political Alliance for Integrity and Reform (RePAIR) is a U.S. political group, founded in August 2020, consisting of Republican politicians who opposed the reelection of President Donald Trump. RePAIR is affiliated with Defending Democracy Together. The group's stated mission is to "return to principles-based governing in the post-Trump era," calling for a change in leadership for the Republican party, and supporting the candidacy of Joe Biden in the 2020 presidential election. The group was founded by former Trump administration official Miles Taylor and is led by former members of Republican administrations, including those of Ronald Reagan, George H. W. Bush, George W. Bush, and Trump.

In 2021, the A Call for American revival movement, which aims to create a new political party as an alternative for the GOP, was formed of members of RePAIR and Stand Up Republic.

== Notable members ==
=== Executive branch officials ===
- Richard Armitage, former Deputy Secretary of State
- Stuart M. Gerson, former Acting Attorney General
- James K. Glassman, former Under Secretary of State for Public Diplomacy and Public Affairs
- John Mitnick, former General Counsel, Department of Homeland Security
- Elizabeth Neumann, former Assistant Secretary for Threat Prevention and Security Policy, Department of Homeland Security in the Trump administration
- Anthony Scaramucci, former White House Communications Director in the Trump Administration
- Olivia Troye, former homeland security and counter-terrorism advisor to Vice President Pence and aide to the White House Coronavirus Task Force in the Trump administration
- Miles Taylor, former Chief of Staff, Department of Homeland Security in the Trump Administration

=== United States senators ===
- David Durenberger, former Senator from Minnesota
- Gordon Humphrey, former Senator from New Hampshire

=== United States representatives ===
- Steve Bartlett, former Congressman from Texas
- Charlie Dent, former Congressman from Pennsylvania
- Charles Djou, former Congressman from Hawaii
- Mickey Edwards, former Congressman from Oklahoma
- Jim Greenwood, former Congressman from Pennsylvania
- Jim Kolbe, former Congressman from Arizona
- Claudine Schneider, former Congresswoman from Rhode Island
- Peter Plympton Smith, former Congressman from Vermont
- Alan Steelman, former Congressman from Texas
- Jim Walsh, former Congressman from New York
- Dick Zimmer, former Congressman from New Jersey

=== Political activists ===
- William Inboden, former Senior Director, National Security Council
- Evan McMullin, former CIA officer
- Tara Setmayer, former Congressional staff member
- Michael Steele, former chairman, Republican National Committee
- Chris Vance, former chair, Washington State Republican Party

== See also ==
- 43 Alumni for Biden
- The Lincoln Project
- List of former Trump administration officials who endorsed Joe Biden
- List of Republicans who opposed the Donald Trump 2016 presidential campaign
- List of Republicans who opposed the Donald Trump 2020 presidential campaign
- List of Trump administration appointees who endorsed Joe Biden
- Never Trump movement
- Republican Voters Against Trump
- Right Side PAC
