= List of Department of Homeland Security appointments by Joe Biden =

Below is a list of nominations and appointments to the Department of Homeland Security by Joe Biden, the 46th president of the United States. As of June 2024, according to tracking by The Washington Post and Partnership for Public Service, 12 nominees have been confirmed, 1 nominee is being considered by the Senate, 5 positions do not have nominees, 17 appointments have been made to positions that do not require Senate confirmation, and 2 positions do not have appointees.

== Color key ==
Denotes appointees awaiting Senate confirmation.

Denotes appointees serving in an acting capacity.

Denotes appointees who have left office or offices which have been disbanded.

== Department of Homeland Security ==
=== Office of the Secretary ===
Office	Nominee	Assumed office	Left office
— Secretary of Homeland Security	Alejandro Mayorkas	February 2, 2021 (Confirmed February 2, 2021, 56–43)	–
— Deputy Secretary of Homeland Security
— Deputy Secretary of Homeland Security	Kristie Canegallo	July 21, 2023	–
— Deputy Secretary of Homeland Security	John Tien	June 24, 2021 (Confirmed June 17, 2021, 60–34)	July 20, 2023
— General Counsel	Jonathan Meyer	October 6, 2021 (Confirmed October 4, 2021, 51–47)	September 11, 2024

=== Management Directorate ===
Office	Nominee	Assumed office	Left office
— Chief Information Officer of Homeland Security	Eric Hysen	February 1, 2021	—

=== Office of Strategy, Policy, and Plans ===
Office	Nominee	Assumed office	Left office
— Under Secretary of Homeland Security (Strategy, Policy and Plans)	Robert P. Silvers	August 10, 2021 (Confirmed August 5, 2021 by voice vote)	December 18, 2024
— Assistant Secretary of Homeland Security (Border and Immigration Policy)	Royce Murray	June 2024	—
— Assistant Secretary of Homeland Security (Border and Immigration Policy)	Blas Nuñez-Neto	October 2021	May 2023
— Assistant Secretary of Homeland Security (Border and Immigration Policy)	Blas Nuñez-Neto	May 2023	June 2024
— Assistant Secretary of Homeland Security (Border and Immigration Policy)	David Shahoulian	January 26, 2021	September 2021
— Assistant Secretary of Homeland Security (Cyber, Infrastructure, Risk, and Resilience)	Iranga Kahangama	May 2022	—
— Assistant Secretary of Homeland Security (Counterterrorism, Threat Prevention, and Law Enforcement Policy)	Jeohn Favors	January 2024	—
— Assistant Secretary of Homeland Security (Counterterrorism, Threat Prevention, and Law Enforcement Policy)	Samantha Vinograd	July 2021	August 2022
— Assistant Secretary of Homeland Security (Counterterrorism, Threat Prevention, and Law Enforcement Policy)	Samantha Vinograd	August 2022	December 2023
— Assistant Secretary of Homeland Security (Counterterrorism, Threat Prevention, and Law Enforcement Policy)	John D. Cohen	January 21, 2021	April 8, 2022
— Assistant Secretary of Homeland Security (International Affairs)	Serena Hoy	May 2021	June 2023
— Assistant Secretary of Homeland Security (Trade and Economic Security)	Christa Brzozowski	November 2023	—
— Assistant Secretary of Homeland Security (Trade and Economic Security)	Bridget McGovern	March 2021	November 2023
— Deputy Assistant Secretary of Homeland Security (Strategic Integration & Policy Planning)	Daniel E. White	May 2024	
— Deputy Assistant Secretary of Homeland Security (Strategic Integration & Policy Planning)	Joel Meyer	April 2022	October 2023

=== Other officers ===
Office	Nominee	Assumed office	Left office
— Under Secretary of Homeland Security (Intelligence and Analysis)	Kenneth L. Wainstein	June 13, 2022 (Confirmed June 7, 2022, 63–35)	—
— Under Secretary of Homeland Security (Science and Technology)	Dimitri Kusnezov	September 29, 2022 (Confirmed September 8, 2022 by voice vote)	—
— Assistant Secretary of Homeland Security (Countering Weapons of Mass Destruction)	Mary Ellen Callahan	August 2023	—
— Assistant Secretary of Homeland Security (Legislative Affairs)	Zephranie Buetow	March 2023	—
— Assistant Secretary of Homeland Security (Legislative Affairs)	Alice Lugo	August 2021	December 2022
— Assistant Secretary of Homeland Security (Partnership and Engagement)	Fayrouz Saad	February 2024	—
— Assistant Secretary of Homeland Security (Partnership and Engagement)	Brenda Abdelall	August 1, 2022	February 2024
— Assistant Secretary of Homeland Security (Partnership and Engagement)	Eva A. Millona	May 26, 2021	August 1, 2022
— Assistant Secretary of Homeland Security (Public Affairs)	Daniel Watson	July 2023	—
— Assistant Secretary of Homeland Security (Public Affairs)	Marsha Espinosa	February 8, 2021	July 2023
— Assistant Secretary of Homeland Security (State and Local Law Enforcement)	Heather Fong	July 31, 2023	—
— Chief Medical Officer of Homeland Security	Pritesh Gandhi	January 20, 2021	January 2023
— Officer for Civil Rights and Civil Liberties	Shoba Sivaprasad Wadhia	April 2023	—
— Officer for Civil Rights and Civil Liberties	Katherine Culliton-González	January 20, 2021	September 2022

== Federal Emergency Management Agency ==
Office	Nominee	Assumed office	Left office
— Administrator of the Federal Emergency Management Agency	Deanne Criswell	April 26, 2021 (Confirmed April 22, 2021 by voice vote)	—
— Deputy Administrator of FEMA	Erik Hooks	December 13, 2021 (Confirmed December 7, 2021 by voice vote)	—
— Assistant Administrator of FEMA (Administration and Grant Programs)	Pamela S. Williams	March 7, 2022	—

== Law Enforcement Agencies ==
Office	Nominee	Assumed office	Left office
United States Customs and Border Protection
— Commissioner of the U.S. Customs and Border Protection	Chris Magnus	December 13, 2021 (Confirmed December 7, 2021, 50–47)	November 12, 2022
— Chief of the Border Patrol	Jason Owens	June 30, 2023	—
— Chief of the Border Patrol	Raúl Ortiz	August 15, 2021	June 30, 2023
United States Secret Service
— Director of the Secret Service	Kimberly Cheatle	September 17, 2022	July 23, 2024

== DHS Agencies & Administrations ==
Office	Nominee	Assumed office	Left office
United States Fire Administration
— Administrator of the United States Fire Administration	Lori Moore-Merrell	October 25, 2021	—
Cybersecurity and Infrastructure Security Agency
— Director of Cybersecurity and Infrastructure Security Agency	Jen Easterly	July 13, 2021 (Confirmed July 12, 2021 by voice vote)	—
United States Citizenship and Immigration Services
— Director of the United States Citizenship and Immigration Services	Ur Jaddou	August 3, 2021 (Confirmed July 30, 2021, 47–34)	—
Transportation Security Administration
— Administrator of the Transportation Security Administration	David Pekoske (Reappointment)	September 19, 2022 (Confirmed September 15, 2022, 77–18)	—
United States Coast Guard
— Commandant of the Coast Guard	Linda L. Fagan	June 1, 2022 (Confirmed May 11, 2022 by voice vote)	—
— Vice Commandant of the Coast Guard	Kevin E. Lunday	June 13, 2024 (Confirmed May 2, 2024 by voice vote)	—
— Vice Commandant of the Coast Guard	Steven D. Poulin	May 31, 2022 (Confirmed May 11, 2022 by voice vote)	June 13, 2024
— Vice Commandant of the Coast Guard	Linda L. Fagan	June 18, 2021 (Confirmed June 17, 2021 by voice vote)	May 31, 2022; Promoted to become Commandant of the Coast Guard

== DHS Task Forces ==
Office	Nominee	Assumed office	Left office
Task Force East
— Director of the Joint Task Force East	Karl L. Schultz	January 4, 2022	—
Joint Interagency Task Force West
— Director of the Joint Interagency Task Force West	Charles E. Fosse	June 25, 2021	—

== Withdrawn nominations ==
Office	Nominee	Announced	Withdrawn	Notes
— Under Secretary of Homeland Security (Management)	William Valdez	July 27, 2021	May 17, 2022	
— Chief Financial Officer of Homeland Security	Jeff Rezmovic	July 11, 2023	January 3, 2025	
— Deputy Administrator of FEMA (Resilience)	Alice Hill	January 7, 2022	May 17, 2022	
Director of the U.S. Immigration and Customs Enforcement	Ed Gonzalez	April 27, 2021	June 27, 2022	

== See also ==
- Cabinet of Joe Biden, for the vetting process undergone by top-level roles including advice and consent by the Senate

== Notes ==
Confirmation votes

Confirmations by roll call vote

Confirmations by voice vote
