= James Percival =

James Percival may refer to:

- James Percival (rugby union) (born 1983), English rugby player
- James H. Percival, American lawyer
- James Gates Percival (1795–1856), American poet and geologist
- James Percival (assemblyman), member of the New York State Assembly 1831
- James Dillon Percival (born 2000), American Filmmaker
