= List of former first Trump administration officials who endorsed Joe Biden =

This is a list of former officials who were appointed by Trump, by one of his appointments, or were not asked to resign who served in his first administration who endorsed Joe Biden in the 2020 presidential campaign.

== White House officials ==
- James Comey, director of the Federal Bureau of Investigation (2013–2017)
- Omarosa Manigault Newman, director of communications for the Office of Public Liaison (2017–2018)
- Anthony Scaramucci, former White House communications director (2017)
- Robert Shanks, former Peace Corps general counsel
- Olivia Troye, former Homeland Security adviser and lead COVID-19 adviser to Mike Pence (2018–2020)
- Alexander Vindman, director of European affairs of the U.S. National Security Council (2018–2020)

== Defense Department officials ==
- Paul J. Selva, vice chairman of the Joint Chiefs of Staff (2015–2019)

== Homeland Security Department officials ==
- John Mitnick, former Department of Homeland Security general counsel (2018–2019)
- Elizabeth Neumann, former Department of Homeland Security assistant secretary for Counterterrorism and Threat Prevention (2016–2020)
- Miles Taylor, chief of staff to Department of Homeland Security Secretary Kirstjen Nielsen (2019)
- William H. Webster, chair of the Homeland Security Advisory Council (2005–2020), director of Central Intelligence (1987–1991), director of the Federal Bureau of Investigation (1978–1987), judge of the U.S. Court of Appeals for the Eighth Circuit (1973–1978), judge of the U.S. District Court for the Eastern District of Missouri (1970–1973), U.S. attorney for the Eastern District of Missouri (1960–1961)

== See also ==
- List of former Trump administration officials who endorsed Kamala Harris
- 43 Alumni for Biden
- List of Joe Biden 2020 presidential campaign endorsements
- List of Republicans who opposed the Donald Trump 2016 presidential campaign
- List of Republicans who opposed the Donald Trump 2020 presidential campaign
- List of Republicans who opposed the Donald Trump 2024 presidential campaign
- Never Trump movement
- REPAIR
- Republican Voters Against Trump
- Right Side PAC
- The Lincoln Project
