= List of former first Trump administration officials who endorsed Kamala Harris =

A number of former officials who were appointed by Donald Trump or one of his appointments, or continued to serve in his first administration when he took office, endorsed Kamala Harris in the 2024 presidential campaign. Half of the people who served in Trump's cabinet did not support his 2024 candidacy.

== White House officials ==
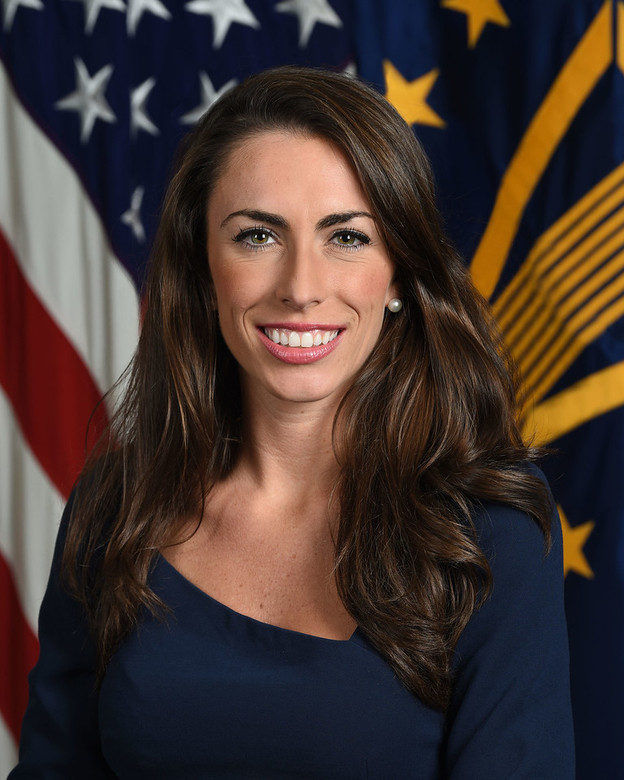
Alyssa Farah Griffin

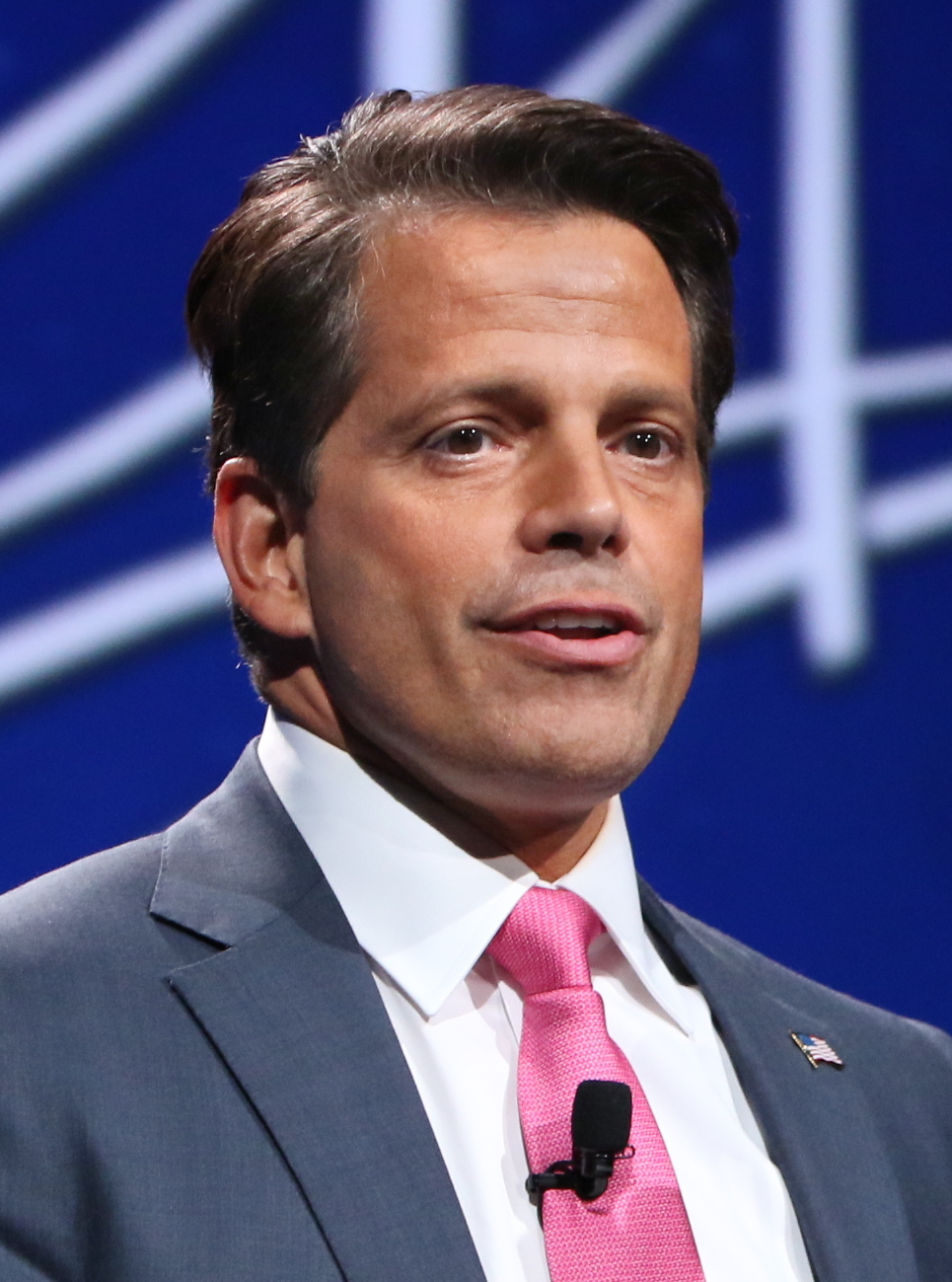
Anthony Scaramucci

- Alyssa Farah Griffin, White House director of strategic communications (2020), press secretary of the U.S. Department of Defense (2019–2020), press secretary to the vice president (2017–2019)
- Stephanie Grisham, White House press secretary (2019–2020), White House communications director (2019–2020), press secretary for the First Lady (2017–2019, 2020–2021), chief of staff to the First Lady (2020–2021)
- Cassidy Hutchinson, executive assistant to the White House chief of staff (2020–2021)
- Sarah Matthews, deputy White House press secretary (2020–2021)
- Omarosa Manigault Newman, communications director of the Office of Public Liaison (2017–2018)
- Anthony Scaramucci, White House communications director (2017)
- Olivia Troye, Homeland Security adviser and lead COVID-19 adviser to Mike Pence (2018–2020)

== Other executive branch officials ==
- Greg Brower, assistant director of the Federal Bureau of Investigation (2017)
- James Comey, director of the Federal Bureau of Investigation (2013–2017)
- Sofia Kinzinger, press secretary U.S. Department of Homeland Security (2020), strategic media director, Office of the U.S. Vice President (2018–2020)
- John Mitnick, former Department of Homeland Security general counsel (2018–2019)
- Elizabeth Neumann, DHS assistant secretary for Counterterrorism and Threat Prevention (2018–2020), DHS deputy chief of staff (2017–2018)

== See also ==
- List of former Trump administration officials who endorsed Joe Biden
- List of Republicans who opposed the Donald Trump 2024 presidential campaign
- List of Kamala Harris 2024 presidential campaign endorsements
- List of Donald Trump 2024 presidential campaign endorsements
