= John Mitnick =

American lawyer (born 1962)

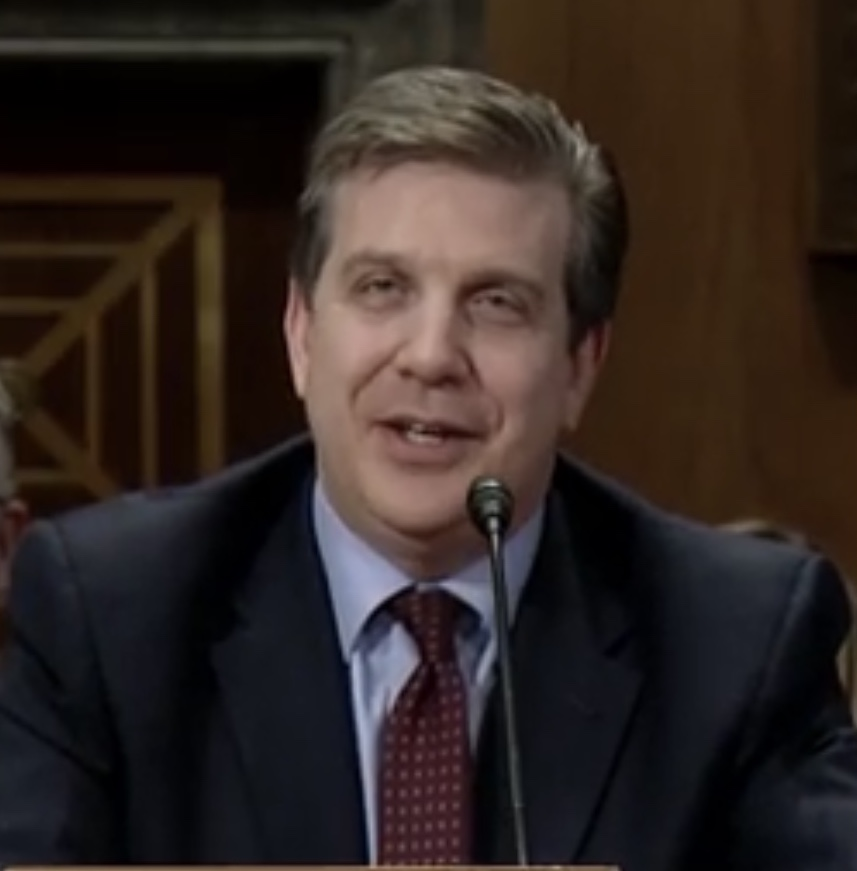

General Counsel of the United States Department of Homeland Security
- In office February 26, 2018 – September 17, 2019
- President: Donald Trump
- Preceded by: Stevan Eaton Bunnell
- Succeeded by: Jonathan Meyer

Personal details
- Born: John Marshall Mitnick; May 8, 1962 (age 63) East Orange, New Jersey, U.S.
- Party: Republican
- Education: Emory University (BA); University of Virginia School of Law (JD); Oxford University (BA)

John Marshall Mitnick (born May 8, 1962) is an American lawyer who served as General Counsel for the United States Department of Homeland Security.

== Biography ==
=== Education ===
He graduated from Emory University in 1984 with a Bachelor of Arts degree in History and Political Science. He received his Bachelor of Arts degree in jurisprudence from the University of Oxford in 1987 and his Juris Doctor degree from the University of Virginia School of Law in 1988.

=== Legal and academic career ===
From 1988 to 2001, he was a partner with the law firm of Kilpatrick Stockton LLP in Atlanta, Georgia. From 1993 to 1996, he served as an adjunct professor of law at the Georgia State University College of Law in Atlanta.

=== Political candidacy ===
He unsuccessfully ran to be a member of the United States House of Representatives for Georgia's 4th congressional district in 1996 and unsuccessfully ran to be a member of the Georgia Senate for the state's 40th District in 2000.

=== Government service ===
From 2001 to 2002, he served as a counsel to the assistant attorney general of the Antitrust Division within the United States Department of Justice. From 2002 to 2004, he served as an associate general counsel for science and technology at the United States Department of Homeland Security.

During the presidency of George W. Bush, he served as deputy counsel of the Homeland Security Council (2004–2005) and then as associate counsel to the president (2005–2007).

He was nominated by President Trump in August 2017 to serve as general counsel of the United States Department of Homeland Security and was confirmed by the United States Senate by voice vote on February 15, 2018.

He was fired as DHS general counsel on September 17, 2019, reportedly because he had resisted illegal policies and actions pushed by White House Senior Advisor Stephen Miller. In 2020 he endorsed Joe Biden's presidential candidacy, along with multiple other Trump former officials. He also joined over 70 former senior Republican national security officials in issuing a statement, initially released on August 20, 2020, critical of Donald Trump and endorsing Joe Biden.

=== Corporate career ===
He served as Vice President, General Counsel, and Secretary at Raytheon from 2007 to 2013.

He served as senior vice president, general counsel, and secretary of the Heritage Foundation from 2014 to 2018.

== Works ==
Mitnick also co-authored a book with James J. Spence, Jr. in 2010 called Team Baseballs: Artifacts of the Game published by Artifact Publishing.

== See also ==
- List of former Trump administration officials who endorsed Kamala Harris
- List of Republicans who oppose the Donald Trump 2024 presidential campaign
- Timeline of the Donald Trump presidency

Legal offices
Preceded by Stevan Eaton Bunnell	General Counsel of the United States Department of Homeland Security; 2018–2019	Succeeded by Jonathan Meyer
