= Olivia Troye =

American National Security expert

- Born: November 19, 1976 (age 49); Reno, Nevada, U.S.
- Education: University of Pennsylvania (BA); National Defense University (MA); Naval Postgraduate School (GrDip)
- Political party: Republican (before 2026); Democratic (2026–present)

Olivia Troye (born November 19, 1976) is an American national security official who worked on national security and homeland security issues at the Department of Defense, National Counterterrorism Center, the United States Department of Energy Office of Intelligence and Counterintelligence, and the DHS Office of Intelligence and Analysis.

She went on to work in the Office of the Vice President of the United States as the Homeland Security and Counterterrorism advisor to Vice President Mike Pence and also served on the White House Coronavirus Task Force as Pence's lead staffer on the Task Force. She resigned from the White House in August 2020.

She ran in the 2026 Democratic primary for Virginia's 7th congressional district until her withdrawal.

== Early life and education ==
Born in Reno, Nevada, and raised on the U.S.–Mexican border in El Paso, Texas, Troye is Mexican American and is fluent in Spanish.

She graduated from the University of Pennsylvania, the National Defense University College of International Affairs, and the Naval Postgraduate School.

== Career ==
After graduating from college, Troye worked for the Republican National Committee. She began a career in national security after the September 11 attacks. She served in the Pentagon as a George W. Bush administration appointee, later becoming a career intelligence officer where she went on to serve in various posts for cabinet level intelligence community officials including at the Director of National Intelligence's National Counterterrorism Center. Troye was an intelligence official in the DHS Office of Intelligence and Analysis serving as chief of strategy, policy, and plans and has talked about her experiences navigating the first Trump administration as a senior career intelligence official on the travel ban, immigration executive orders, and natural disaster responses.

Troye worked in the Office of the Vice President of the United States as the homeland security and counterterrorism advisor to Vice President Pence and served as an aide to the White House Coronavirus Task Force. Her portfolio covered natural disasters, mass shootings, domestic terrorism and global terrorism issues. Troye also worked on Latin America and Africa foreign policy issues as well.

While Troye claims she resigned, Mike Pence's national security adviser, Keith Kellogg, claims he fired her and "escorted her off the compound". He has also more generally accused her of lying about her time in the Trump-Pence administration. Troye has denied these allegations.

After leaving the White House, Troye became an outspoken critic against the Trump administration's response on the COVID-19 pandemic, immigration policies, and the danger he posed to government institutions and foreign relations.

In the wake of the collapse of the Afghan government and the fall of Kabul in August 2021, Troye called attention to deliberate obstruction of the visa process during the Trump administration, especially by Stephen Miller, for Afghans who were partners with U.S. efforts in Afghanistan.

In August 2020, Troye briefly joined the National Insurance Crime Bureau as vice president of strategy, policy, and plans and departed in order to speak out against Trump. Troye served as advisor to Defending Democracy Together, an anti-Donald Trump political group known for the "Republicans for the Rule of Law" initiative.

In 2024, she appeared with Vice President Kamala Harris at an event in support of abortion rights and spoke at the Democratic National Convention.

Troye served on the board of directors of Voters of Tomorrow, an advocacy organization that promotes political engagement among Generation Z.

== Personal life ==
According to CNN, in 2020, Troye was a lifelong Republican. She described herself as a "John McCain Republican" in a video released by Republican Voters Against Trump.

In 2020, Troye, along with over 130 other former Republican national security officials, signed a statement that asserted that President Trump was unfit to serve another term, and "To that end, we are firmly convinced that it is in the best interest of our nation that Vice President Joe Biden be elected as the next President of the United States, and we will vote for him."

Since 2020, Troye has remained an outspoken critic of Donald Trump and extremism in the Republican Party. She appeared as a surrogate on the Harris Presidential Campaign, and spoke at the 2024 Democratic National Convention. She has resided in the Northern Virginia area for over 20 years. She is the daughter of a Mexican woman, Marie Troye, who immigrated to the United States. Her father, Richard Eugene Troye (November 9, 1939 – November 29, 2001), was a life long truck driver.

== See also ==
- List of former Trump administration officials who endorsed Joe Biden
- List of former Trump administration officials who endorsed Kamala Harris
- List of Kamala Harris 2024 presidential campaign endorsements
- List of Republicans who opposed the Donald Trump 2024 presidential campaign
