= Right Side PAC =

American political action committee

Right Side PAC was a super PAC created by a group of Republicans with a mission of convincing anti-Donald Trump Republican voters to vote for Democratic presidential nominee Joe Biden in the 2020 United States presidential election. It was a single-candidate PAC, with Biden being the only supported candidate.

The group targeted voters in swing states such as Arizona, Florida, Michigan, North Carolina, Pennsylvania, and Wisconsin.

The group was led by Matt Borges, a former chairman of the Ohio Republican Party. Former White House Communications Director Anthony Scaramucci who served under Trump, is also a member of the PAC. The super PAC shut down in July 2020 – a month after being formed – after Borges was arrested on federal corruption charges.

== See also ==
- 43 Alumni for Biden
- Never Trump movement
- The Lincoln Project
- List of former Trump administration officials who endorsed Joe Biden
- List of Republicans who opposed the Donald Trump 2016 presidential campaign
- List of Republicans who opposed the Donald Trump 2020 presidential campaign
- List of Trump administration appointees who endorsed Joe Biden
- REPAIR
- Republican Voters Against Trump
