= 43 Alumni for America =

American political action committee

- 43 Alumni for America
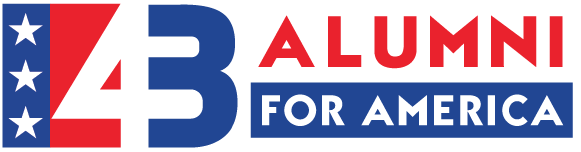
- Website: Official website

43 Alumni for America, formerly 43 Alumni for Biden, is a Super PAC created by administration and campaign officials of the 43rd US president George W. Bush with a mission to mobilize Republican voters to vote for the Democratic presidential candidate Joe Biden in the 2020 US presidential election.

The advertising included positive portrayals of Biden in swing states such as Pennsylvania, Wisconsin, Michigan, Florida, and Ohio. The PAC has over 360 members, including former cabinet members and senior officials.

The group released videos from former officials in support of Joe Biden. The group had been in contact with the Joe Biden 2020 presidential campaign but has no direct affiliation with former president George W. Bush.

Because it was formed a day after the June 30 deadline that would have required disclosure of its donors in mid-July, the group would not have to make the disclosure until mid-October, less than three weeks before the election. They raised $96,234 (~$111,626 in 2023) during the 2020 election cycle.

After Biden was elected, its name changed into 43 Alumni for America (43A4A).

== See also ==
- Never Trump movement
- The Lincoln Project
- List of former Trump administration officials who endorsed Joe Biden
- List of Republicans who opposed the Donald Trump 2016 presidential campaign
- List of Republicans who opposed the Donald Trump 2020 presidential campaign
- REPAIR
- Republican Voters Against Trump
- Right Side PAC
