= Shoba Sivaprasad Wadhia =

American lawyer

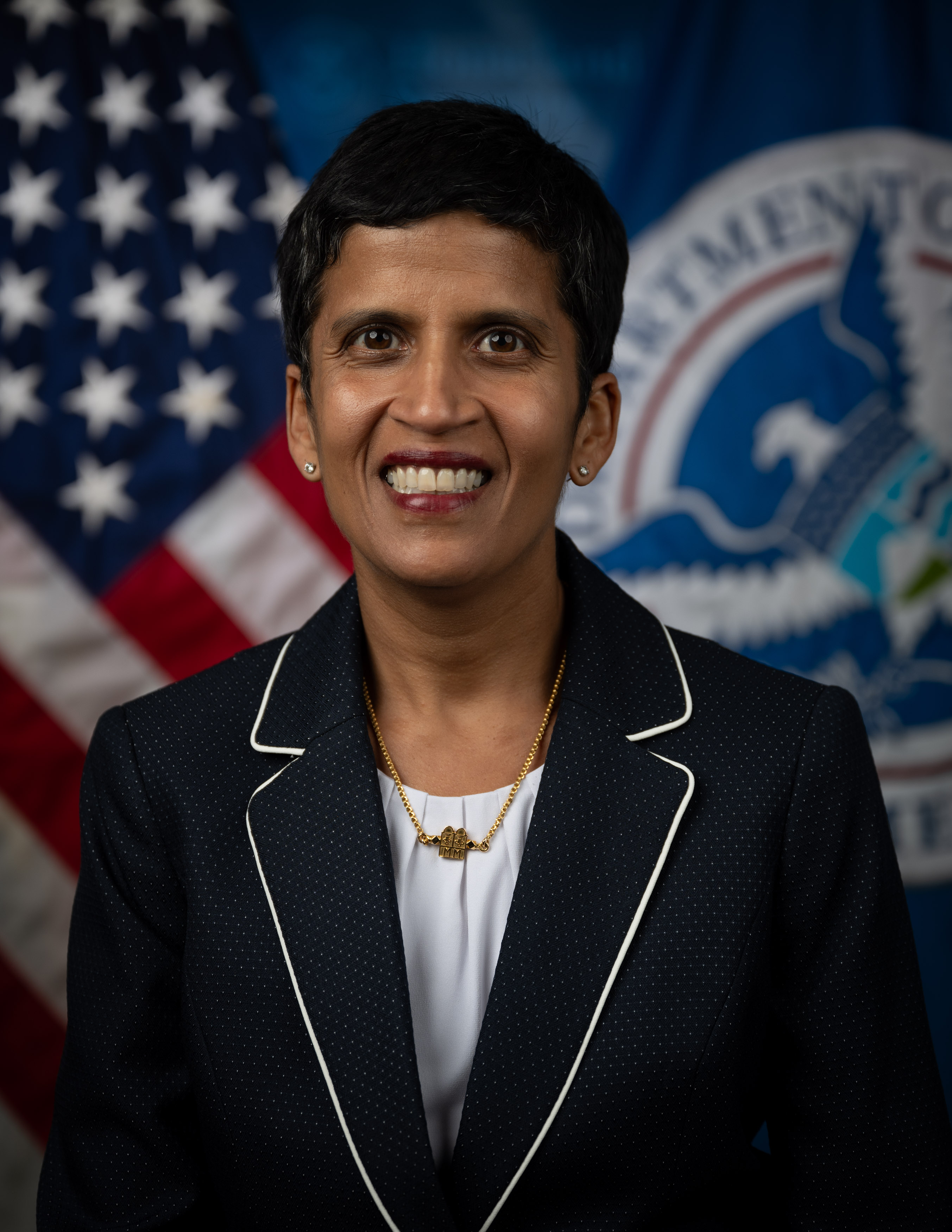
- Wadhia in 2023
- Occupation: Lawyer

Academic background
- Education: Indiana University Bloomington; Georgetown University Law Center

Academic work
- Institutions: Penn State Law

Shoba Sivaprasad Wadhia is an American lawyer a clinical professor of law at Penn State Law.

== Life ==
Wadhia earned a B.A. in political science with honors from Indiana University Bloomington in 1996. She was a legal intern with the Superior Court of the District of Columbia in the fall of 1997. She completed a J.D. from Georgetown University Law Center in 1999. Wadhia was a research assistant for T. Alexander Aleinikoff.

From 1998 to 2002, Wadhia was a law clerk and later associate with the immigration law firm, Maggio Kattar of P.C. in Washington, D.C., where she represented individuals and families in asylum, deportation, family, and employment-based immigration. From 2002 to 2008, she was deputy director for legal affairs at the National Immigration Forum, where she provided legal and policy expertise on multiple legislative efforts, including the creation of the United States Department of Homeland Security (DHS), comprehensive immigration reform, immigration enforcement, and immigration policy post the September 11 attacks.

Wadhia joined Penn State Law in 2008 as a clinical professor of law. She became the Samuel Wiess Faculty Scholar in 2013. In 2020, she became its associate dean for diversity, equity, and inclusion. Wadhia is taking a leave of absence as of 2023. Her research focuses on the role of prosecutorial discretion in immigration law and the intersections of race, national security, and immigration. Wadhia teaches doctrinal courses in immigration and asylum and refugee law. She also helped to develop a course on Law & (In)equity. Wadhia is the founder/director of the Center for Immigrants’ Rights Clinic (CIRC).

Wadhia authored two books with New York University Press: "Beyond Deportation: The Role of Prosecutorial Discretion in Immigration Cases (2015) and Banned: Immigration Enforcement in the Time of Trump" (2019). She is also the co-author of "Immigration and Nationality Law: Problems and Solutions," published by Carolina Academic Press. She served as the inaugural editor-in-chief of the American Immigration Lawyers Association (AILA) Law Journal from 2019 to 2022. She testified before the United States Congress on the history of prosecutorial discretion in immigration cases and the civil rights and discrimination in Muslim, Arab, and South Asian communities. She was elected to the American Law Institute in 2021.

In 2023, Wadhia was appointed the DHS officer for civil rights and civil liberties.
