= Richard Pilger =

American lawyer (born 1965)

Personal details
- Born: 1965 (age 60–61)
- Education: University of Notre Dame (BA); Indiana University, Bloomington (JD)

Richard Pilger (born 1965) is an American attorney and retired government official who served as the Director of the Election Crimes Branch at the Criminal Division of the United States Department of Justice from March 2010 to November 2020, returning to the civil service position in February 2021 through his retirement in July 2022. He is currently an unaffiliated private attorney.

== Early life and education ==
Pilger was born in 1965. Pilger studied English and Philosophy at the University of Notre Dame from 1983 to 1987. In 1990, he earned a Juris Doctor from Indiana University Maurer School of Law in Bloomington, Indiana.

== Career ==
After law school, Pilger clerked for James T. Moody, a United States District Court Judge. He joined the United States Department of Justice via the Attorney General's Honors Program.

== IRS targeting controversy ==
In October 2010, Pilger met with IRS Exempt Organizations director Lois Lerner to discuss enforcement of campaign finance laws against tax-exempt organizations following the Citizens United decision. Pilger's email initiating the contact requested a "good IRS contact re criminal tax enforcement against tax exempt organizations." The House Oversight Committee characterized the meeting as the Justice Department seeking IRS assistance "in the criminal enforcement of campaign-finance laws against politically active nonprofits." Deputy Attorney General James M. Cole testified that there was nothing improper about the meeting.

When the IRS targeting controversy became public in 2013, congressional investigators identified Pilger's 2010 communications with Lerner as evidence of early coordination between the agencies. The Justice Department's 2015 investigation found no evidence of criminal violations.

=== Notable cases ===
Prior to assuming his duties for election crimes, Pilger directly handled investigations, prosecutions, and appeals across the complete spectrum of public corruption matters at all levels and in all branches of government. Some of his notable cases include United States v. Spargo, N.D.N.Y. (judicial extortion); United States v. Siegelman & Scrushy, et al., (M.D. Al.) (former Governor and former CEO of HealthSouth convicted of bribery and obstruction of justice); United States v. Plowman, (S.D. Ind.) (Indianapolis city council and police extortion); United States v. Zachares, (D.D.C.) (former senior congressional staffer convicted of honest services fraud involving Jack Abramoff); United States v. West, et al., (E.D. Va.) (fraud and bank theft ring operated by CIA employees); United States v. Carroll, et al., (N.D. Ill.) (first modern conviction of U.S. Foreign Service Officer for overseas bribery conspiracy); Operation Lost Trust, (D.S.C.) (legislative bribery in South Carolina); and Operation BOPTROT, (E.D. Ky.) (legislative bribery in Kentucky); United States v. Newsome, et al., (E.D. Ky.) (vote-buying conspiracy). Pilger has received numerous awards for his corruption prosecutions, including the Attorney General's Distinguished Service Award, and the Assistant Attorney General's Award for Outstanding Trial Advocacy.

=== 2020 election and resignation ===
Pilger resigned as Director on November 9, 2020, after Attorney General William Barr authorized federal prosecutors to investigate "clear and apparently-credible allegations" of voter fraud before the 2020 presidential election results were certified. Barr's memo cautioned that "specious, speculative, fanciful or far-fetched claims should not be a basis for initiating federal inquiries." In his resignation letter, Pilger described the memo as "an important new policy abrogating the forty-year-old Non-Interference Policy for ballot fraud investigations in the period prior to elections becoming certified."

On December 1, 2020, Barr told the Associated Press that federal prosecutors and the FBI had not found evidence of widespread fraud: "To date, we have not seen fraud on a scale that could have effected a different outcome in the election." Pilger continued at the Department of Justice as a prosecutor in the Public Integrity Section until February 2021, when he resumed his role as Director of the Election Crimes Branch.
