= Blas Nuñez-Neto =

American government official

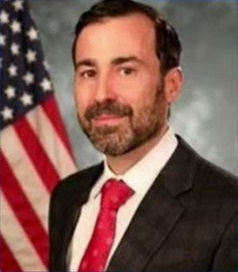

Assistant Secretary of Homeland Security for Border and Immigration Policy
- In office October 2021 – June 2024
- President: Joe Biden

Personal details
- Education: University of Pennsylvania (BA); Fels Institute of Government (MA)

Blas Nuñez-Neto (born 1973/1974) is an American former government official who served as the Assistant Secretary of Homeland Security for Border and Immigration Policy in the Joe Biden administration. He has been described as a key architect of the Biden administration's immigration policy. He played a central role in Senate negotiations over a bipartisan border deal that was ultimately scuttled when former president Donald Trump pressured Republicans to abandon it.

== Early life and education ==
Nuñez-Neto was born in Argentina. He immigrated to the United States at age 9 with his mother, who worked at the Argentine Embassy in Washington, D.C. Nuñez-Neto earned a Bachelor of Arts from the University of Pennsylvania, and later his graduate degree in government administration from the Fels Institute of Government at the university.

== Career ==
After graduate school, he worked at the Congressional Research Service. Later, Nuñez-Neto was an aide on border security to Sen. Tom Carper (D-Del.).

=== Obama Administration ===
In January 2015, Nuñez-Neto became a senior adviser in Customs and Border Protection in the Barack Obama administration.

=== Biden Administration ===
He worked on border security issues at the RAND Corporation until 2021 when he became chief operating officer for Customs and Border Protection (CBP) in the Joe Biden administration. Later that year, he took a position in the Department of Homeland Security. Nuñez-Neto has a close partnership with Roberto Velasco Álvarez, the top official at Mexico's Foreign Ministry for North American affairs, who substantially curtailed illegal border crossings into the United States.

In 2024, Nuñez-Neto was promoted to a position in the White House.
