= Jonathan Meyer =

American lawyer & government official (born 1965)

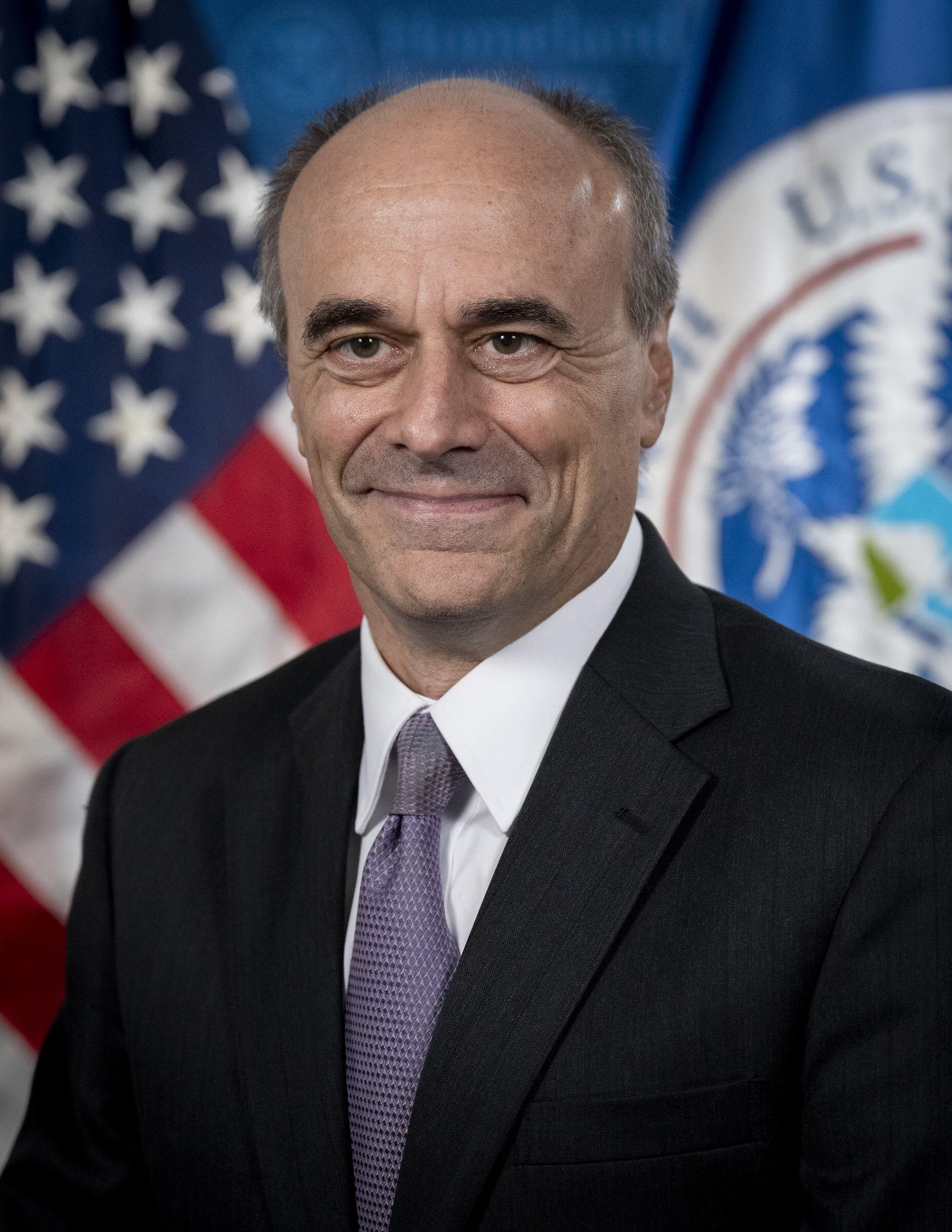

General Counsel of the United States Department of Homeland Security
- In office October 6, 2021 – September 11, 2024
- President: Joe Biden
- Preceded by: John Mitnick
- Succeeded by: James Percival

Personal details
- Born: Jonathan Eugene Meyer; April 11, 1965 (age 61)
- Children: 3
- Education: Harvard University (AB); Columbia University (JD); Princeton University (MPA)

Jonathan Eugene Meyer (born April 11, 1965) is an American lawyer and government official who served as the sixth general counsel of the United States Department of Homeland Security from 2021-24.

== Early life and education ==
Originally from Cincinnati, Meyer attended Walnut Hills High School. He earned a Bachelor of Arts degree from Harvard University, a Juris Doctor from the Columbia University School of Law, and a Masters in Public Affairs from Princeton University. He is a son of Professor Michael A. Meyer and Rabbi Margaret J. Meyer. He spent part of his childhood in Jerusalem, Israel and speaks fluent Hebrew and French.

== Career ==
Between college and law school, he worked on the staff of Republican Congressman Bill Gradison of Ohio. After law school, he worked in private practice as a litigator and corporate lawyer. Meyer later served as a deputy assistant attorney general at the United States Department of Justice before serving as counsel to then-Senator Joe Biden on the Senate Judiciary Committee, and as the Senator's acting Chief Counsel. He later served as a special deputy general counsel of Amtrak, before reprising his role at the DOJ at the beginning of the presidency of Barack Obama. Meyer joined the Department of Homeland Security in 2011, where he served as senior counselor and deputy general counsel until 2016. He then joined the law firm Sheppard Mullin as a partner, where he worked until 2021. While in private practice, Meyer continued to make sporadic media appearances. Following the 2020 Election, then-President-elect Joe Biden appointed Meyer to co-lead the DHS Agency Review Team as a part of the presidential transition.

== General counsel of Homeland Security ==
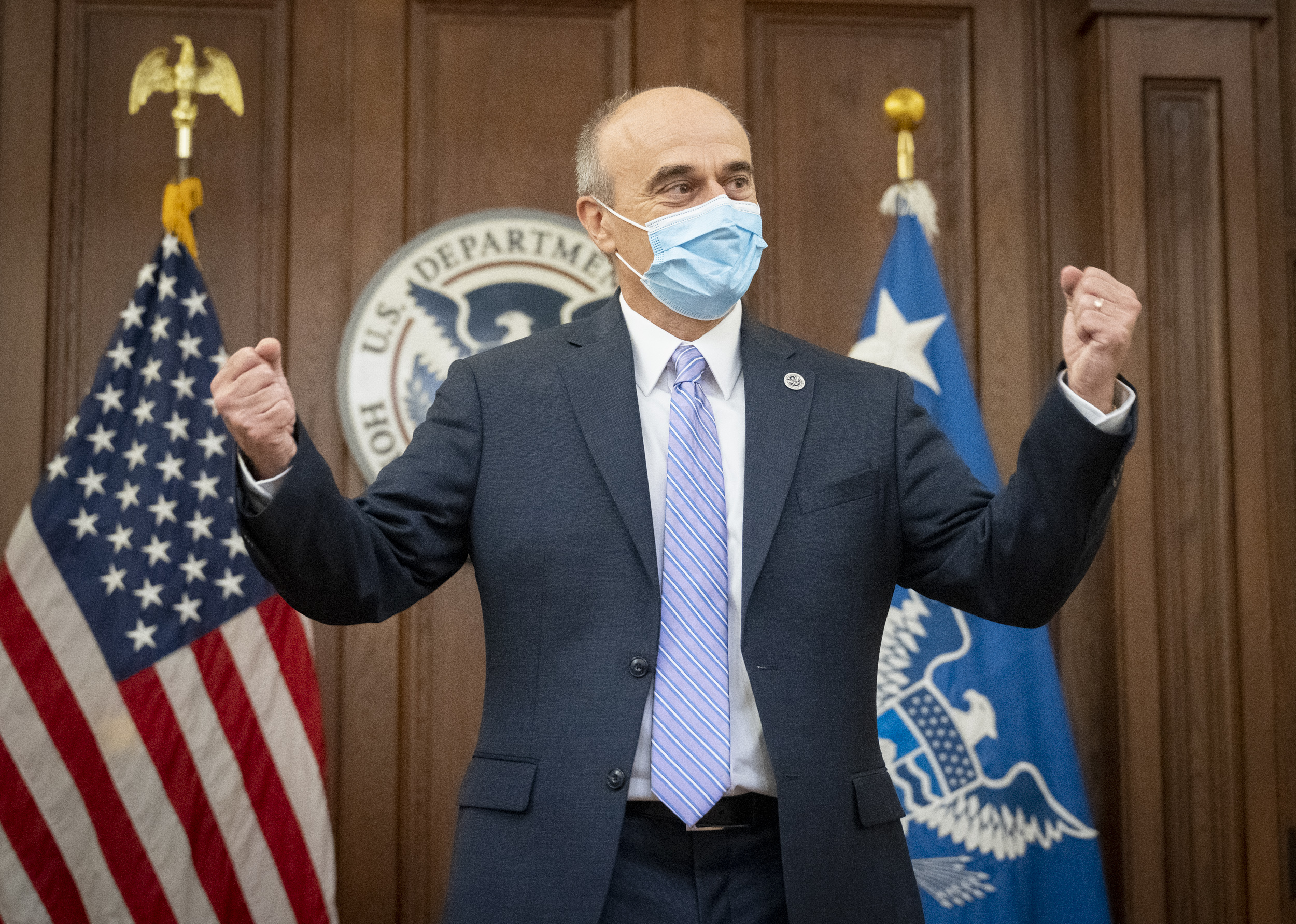
Meyer addresses DHS employees and senior leadership after being sworn in by Secretary Mayorkas

On April 12, 2021, President Joe Biden announced Meyer as the nominee to be the Department of Homeland Security general counsel. The nomination was widely reported, emphasizing the fact that "Meyer and Biden go way back." On April 29, 2021, his nomination was formally received by the United States Senate and referred to the Committee on Homeland Security and Government Affairs. On May 27, 2021, a hearing on his nomination was held before the Senate Committee on Homeland Security and Governmental Affairs. Cloture was invoked on Meyer's nomination on September 29, 2021, by a vote of 52-46 and he was confirmed by the United States Senate on October 4, 2021, by a vote of 51–47. He was sworn in on October 6, 2021, by Secretary Alejandro Mayorkas.

== Support and opposition ==
Meyer is the only General Counsel of DHS to have worked at the department prior to his nomination. He was endorsed for confirmation by four of the five prior DHS General Counsels, two Democrats and two Republicans. His confirmation received bipartisan support, including favorable votes from three Republicans – Senators Portman, Capito, and Paul – as well as all Democrats.

Meyer was named on a Business Insider list of 31 Biden appointees with "potential ethical conflicts," which included the majority of the Cabinet. The article also highlighted Meyer's financial disclosure, placing him in the category of making more than $500,000 per year as a partner in private practice, having represented clients such as Deloitte and Salesforce. His disclosure included a "confidential client whom he did not identify because the individual was subject to a non-public investigation." The Revolving Door Project, operated by the progressive Center for Economic and Policy Research, claimed that Meyer represented numerous military contractors, as well.

Republican Senator Rob Portman claimed Meyer was slow and not forthcoming in his responses to members of Congress during his time in the Obama administration. Democratic Senator Gary Peters, however, rebutted this, saying Meyer "has demonstrated that he understands the complex legal issues facing DHS and the importance of ensuring that the Department cooperates with Congressional oversight." Portman later issued a statement saying he had a secured a commitment from Meyer "that he would provide complete and timely materials requested by the Committee for oversight purposes." Both Senators ultimately voted for Meyer's confirmation. In September 2024, Meyer left the Department and, in October 2024, return to the Sheppard Mullin law firm where he heads its national security law practice.

== Personal life ==
Meyer lives in Chevy Chase, Maryland with his wife and three children. He is an "avid fan" of the Cincinnati Reds and Bengals.

Political offices
Preceded by John Mitnick	General Counsel of the United States Department of Homeland Security; 2021-2024	Succeeded by James H. Percival
