= Miles Taylor (security expert) =

American government official (born 1987)

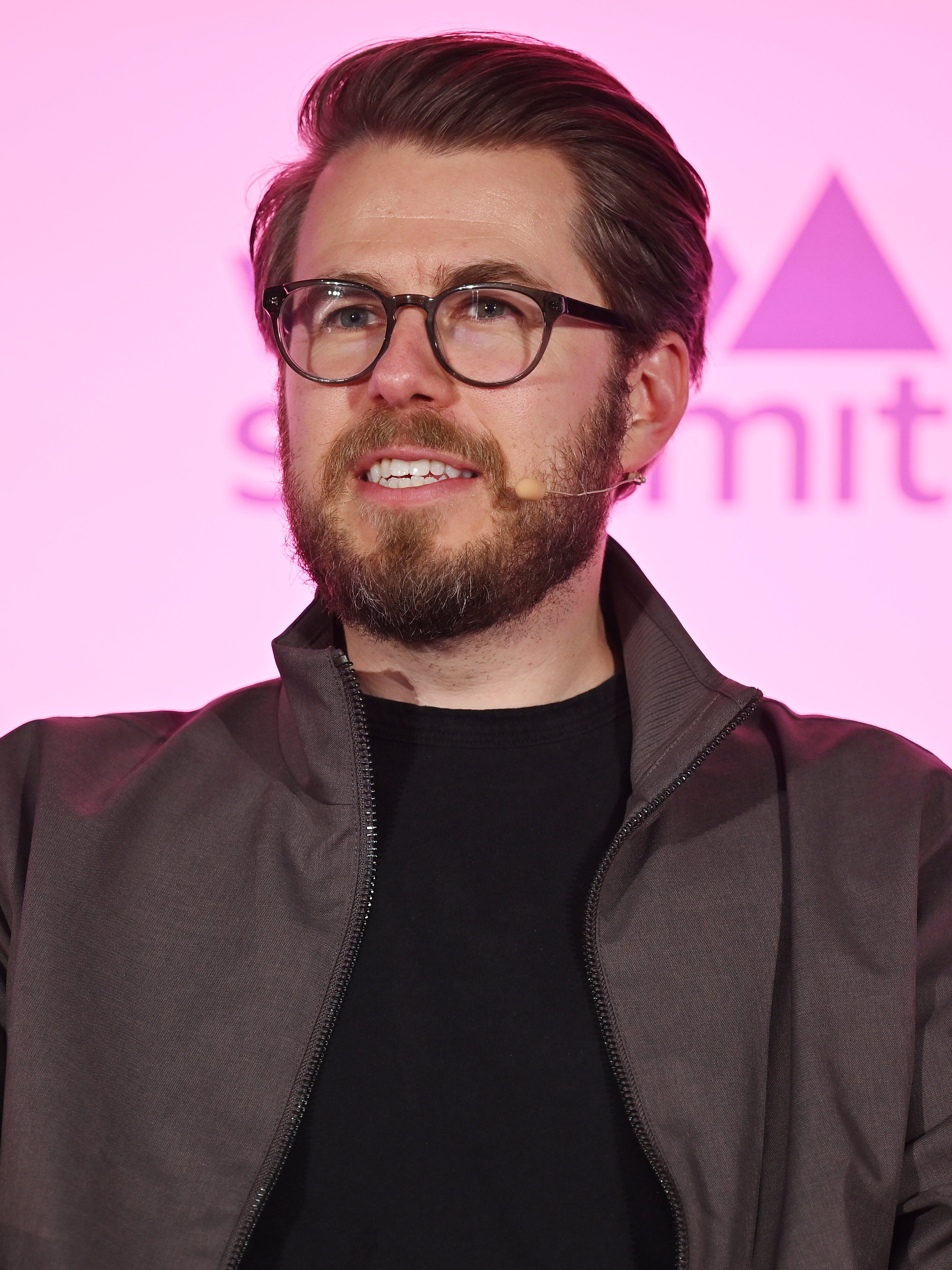
- Taylor during the Web Summit 2024

Chief of Staff of the United States Department of Homeland Security
- In office February 8, 2019 – September 2019
- President: Donald Trump
- Preceded by: Chad Wolf
- Succeeded by: Chad Mizelle (acting)

Personal details
- Born: February 20, 1987 (age 39)
- Party: Forward (2022–present)
- Other political affiliations: Independent (2022); Republican (until 2022)
- Education: Indiana University Bloomington (BA); New College, Oxford (MPhil)

Miles Taylor (born February 20, 1987) is an American author, commentator, and former government official who served in the administrations of George W. Bush and Donald Trump. In the first Trump administration, he was an appointee in the U.S. Department of Homeland Security (DHS) from 2017 to 2019. He was first recruited into the department by former DHS Secretary and White House Chief of Staff John F. Kelly, serving as his senior advisor.

In 2018, Taylor wrote an op-ed in The New York Times under the pen name "Anonymous" titled "I Am Part of the Resistance Inside the Trump Administration", which drew widespread attention for its criticism of Trump. Several months after quitting the administration, again under the pen name "Anonymous", he published a book in 2019 titled, A Warning. In 2020, he revealed that he was "Anonymous" while campaigning against Trump's reelection.

Taylor was the first former Trump administration official to endorse Joe Biden and launched a group of ex-officials to oppose Trump's re-election. Taylor is an advisor to emerging technology companies and a regular news commentator on issues related to technology and national security. He has also worked as a university lecturer on national security.

== Early life and education ==
Taylor grew up in La Porte, Indiana, where he was an Indiana state debate champion, and one of the valedictorians of his class at La Porte High School in 2006. While in high school, he served as a page in the U.S. House of Representatives in Washington, D.C. He received a Bachelor of Arts degree in international security studies from Indiana University Bloomington, which he attended as a Harry S. Truman Scholar and Herman B. Wells Scholar. As a senior, he received IU's inaugural Presidential Student Internship and was a recipient of the Elvis J. Stahr Award awarded to the university's top few graduating seniors.

Taylor received a Master of Philosophy in International Relations from New College, Oxford, which he attended as a 2012 Marshall Scholar.

== Career ==
Taylor's decision to have a career in government was largely motivated by the September 11 attacks in 2001. He later said that he "wanted to focus my entire professional life on making sure a day like that wouldn't happen again, and dedicating my career to, what I thought, was the mission of this country, and that's the advancement of human freedom."

In 2007, while in college, Taylor interned in the office of the Secretary of Defense and the office of Vice President Dick Cheney. In 2008, he worked as the briefing book coordinator at the Department of Homeland Security for Secretary Michael Chertoff and Deputy Secretary Paul A. Schneider. In 2009, he served as a regional policy intern for the Department of Defense.

Taylor was a political appointee in the George W. Bush administration. He was a staffer for the House Appropriations Committee and then the Committee on Homeland Security, where he served on Chairman Michael McCaul's staff. Taylor was McCaul's chief speechwriter and national security advisor on counterterrorism and foreign policy. He also served as the majority staff lead for the congressional Task Force on Combating Terrorist and Foreign Fighter Travel. In 2015, he was named a Penn Kemble Fellow by the National Endowment for Democracy.

In 2016, Taylor co-wrote House Speaker Paul Ryan's national security strategy, released publicly as the "Better Way" agenda.

=== Department of Homeland Security ===
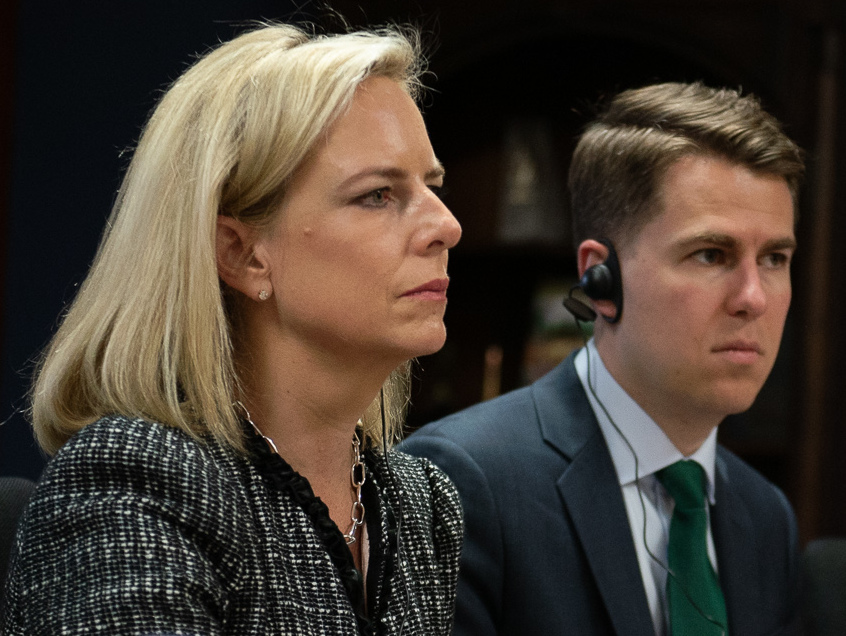
Taylor (right) with then-Secretary Nielsen in 2018

Taylor joined the Department of Homeland Security (DHS) in February 2017, when John Kelly, later White House Chief of Staff, was Secretary of Homeland Security. Taylor served as DHS deputy chief of staff and senior advisor to Kelly. He later served as chief of staff of DHS toward the end of the tenure of Secretary Kirstjen Nielsen and the beginning of Acting Secretary Kevin McAleenan. During his tenure in the DHS, Taylor contributed to expanding U.S. protections against weaponized drones, and led sensitive counterterrorism activities at DHS, including work to disrupt terrorist plots "that spanned multiple cells, multiple countries, and multiple attack vectors."

Taylor previously described a version of the Trump administration's travel restrictions as "tough" but "tailored". He reportedly clashed with other officials to try to limit the number of countries affected by it. He was also involved in debates regarding Trump administration immigration policies. He later described the Trump administration family separation policy as a "sickening display of bad judgment". Taylor cited the "train wreck" policy as one of his reasons for quitting the Trump administration in protest, calling it "one of the most disheartening and disgusting things I've ever experienced in public service." Taylor led the DHS's first real-life preparations for a possible nuclear attack in the wake of North Korean tests of long-range missiles. Following Russian interference in the 2016 United States elections, Taylor helped with rearchitecting U.S. election security to prevent foreign meddling in American elections, including the U.S. response to ongoing Russian interference.

=== "Anonymous" ===
Taylor authored a September 2018 The New York Times op-ed titled, "I Am Part of the Resistance Inside the Trump Administration" under the name "Anonymous". MSNBC's Mika Brzezinski noted that "the Trump Administration and the country were turned upside down" by the piece. He said that, in April 2019, he had personally witnessed President Trump offer Homeland Security staff federal pardons for any criminal prosecution arising from their actions in stopping illegal immigration to the United States, and it was at that point that Taylor decided to resign from the department. He left DHS in June 2019, and anonymously released a follow-up book titled A Warning (November 2019), which included an account of the instability inside the Trump White House and administration. USA Today called the book "a scathing portrait of a president and administration in chaos," and The Washington Post wrote that the book had "no modern historical parallel for a firsthand account of a sitting president written in book form by an anonymous author". It reached number one on The New York Times Best Seller list.

In an online discussion after the release of A Warning, Taylor answered questions anonymously and said he would reveal his identity in the coming months before the 2020 election. He also pledged to donate the bulk of the proceeds from the book to nonprofit organizations such as the White House Correspondents' Association, and subsequently announced he donated the royalties to a range of organizations.

He publicly revealed his identity in the days leading up to the 2020 election with a public statement reprinted in the New York Times. Of his decision not to reveal his identity, Taylor said in October 2020: "Issuing my critiques without attribution forced the President to answer them directly on their merits or not at all, rather than creating distractions through petty insults and name-calling. I wanted the attention to be on the arguments themselves."

=== Google ===
In September 2019, Taylor was hired by Google as a government affairs and public policy manager with a title of head of national security policy engagement. He was later promoted to lead Google's advanced technology and security strategy. Around the same time, he also became a senior fellow at the Auburn University McCrary Center for Cyber and Critical Infrastructure Security and a member of the Council on Foreign Relations.

=== Public disclosures about the first Trump administration ===
In August 2020, Taylor took a leave of absence from Google to support Joe Biden's presidential campaign. He made an advertisement for Republican Voters Against Trump, denouncing Trump and endorsing Biden in the 2020 presidential election. That same month, Taylor also wrote an opinion piece for The Washington Post. Columnist Jennifer Rubin said the op-ed added "detail to what we could have only surmised was the story behind chaotic policy rollouts" and that the advertisement he released "may be the most compelling of the 2020 election cycle". The next day, Taylor appeared on multiple news and analysis shows saying that other former members of the Trump administration were considering speaking out similarly. On August 24, Taylor confirmed to NBC News that he was co-founding, with two other unnamed Republican officials, the Republican Political Alliance for Integrity and Reform (REPAIR), a group that aimed to oppose reelection of Trump and to reform the Republican Party after the 2020 election.

Taylor's attacks against Trump were extensive. Among other anecdotes, he revealed that Trump was too distracted to pay attention to intelligence briefings, that Trump refused internal recommendations to punish Moscow for interference in U.S. affairs, and that Trump wanted to "swap" Puerto Rico for Greenland because it was "dirty and the people were poor". Taylor also said that Trump tried to block emergency aid for California wildfire victims because it was a Democratic state, and that Trump told his homeland security secretary to take marching orders from cable talk-show host Lou Dobbs.

In 2020, Taylor, along with over 130 other former Republican national security officials, signed a statement that asserted that President Trump was unfit to serve another term, and "To that end, we are firmly convinced that it is in the best interest of our nation that Vice President Joe Biden be elected as the next President of the United States, and we will vote for him."

In September 2020, Taylor revealed to The Lincoln Project that, before he resigned from the DHS, a senior presidential adviser told him about a list of executive orders that had been prepared in case President Trump would win a second term, which Taylor alleged were orders deemed unacceptable during a first term presidency because they could harm the president's chances of reelection. Later, BuzzFeed reporter Hamed Aleaziz concluded that Taylor was implying Stephen Miller was that senior presidential adviser, with The Guardian reiterating this claim and reporting that Miller's biographer Jean Guerrero warned about a "wishlist" of his relating to immigration policy under a Trump second term.

Taylor also told news organizations that Trump ordered officials to have American flags raised back up when they were lowered in honor of Senator John McCain, and that Trump deliberately ignored warnings about the rise of domestic terrorism for political reasons. Taylor was also among those who appeared on a special that aired on CNN in October 2020, titled, "The Insiders: A Warning from Former Trump Officials". During the special, Taylor criticized Trump's singular focus on immigration, especially the border wall, saying that his "wall-or-nothing approach to governing meant the president ignored some of the most critical homeland security threats to our country, cybersecurity challenges, counterterrorism, manmade and natural disasters, and foreign interference in our democracy."

In an interview with MSNBC in June 2021 and subsequent public statements, Taylor stated that "the number one national security threat" to the United States was "extremist elements" within his own party, including those that resulted in the January 6th Insurrection. On his stand against the rightward trajectory of the GOP, Taylor told an interviewer at the Salzburg Global Seminar in December 2022: "I don't consider myself…courageous. I consider a lot of the people that were in the Republican Party with me as cowardly."

=== Technology policy, writing, and news commentary ===
Taylor became a CNN contributor in August 2020. Following Trump's loss to Biden, Taylor stepped down from his role at Google. Taylor regularly appears on CNN, MSNBC, BBC, and other news outlets on issues related to national security, technology, and public policy. He has been a vocal commentator on the economic and geopolitical implications of artificial intelligence and quantum computing. Taylor is also a part-time faculty member at the University of Pennsylvania.

Taylor's second book, entitled Blowback, was published in 2023, and reached number five on the New York Times best-seller list. Taylor published voice messages on social media purporting to show the threats he had received in advance of the book's release. Taylor also served as the host and executive producer of iHeart Media's podcast series The Whistleblowers and as a Special Contributor to Americast by BBC News.

Taylor is a co-founder of the tech hub in the nation's capital, Station DC, and an advisor at the strategy firm Washington Office.

Taylor has been a frequent public commentator on AI technology and national security, including highlighting the challenges posed by synthetic media. In 2024, NBC News reported that Taylor led "war games" on how AI-powered tools might be used to launch new attacks against the United States and ways to leverage the technology against emerging threats. He subsequently produced a public service announcement on AI deepfakes with actor and comedian Ed Helms, featuring celebrities including Amy Schumer, Michael Douglas, Chris Rock, Laura Dern and Rosario Dawson.

Taylor has also spoken about the public policy implications of quantum computing. In written testimony to Congress, he described quantum AI as "the arms race of the 21st Century" and urged greater investment in the technology. Taylor helped develop a bill to boost U.S. investment in quantum computing, which was passed as part of the CHIPS Act. In a journal article, he proposed the concept of the "qubit military advantage (QMA)" — described as "the marginal additional processing power one armed force is able to bring to bear against another" via quantum computing — which he predicted would create new geopolitical competition. "Whichever nation has the computer with the most qubits will have an edge, able to exceed the processing power of rivals," Taylor wrote. "That might mean their drones will be able to out-swarm those of rivals, or that their network defenses will be able to outsmart even the most sophisticated foreign hackers."

=== Political activity ===
In the wake of the May 2021 decision by House Republicans to remove Representative Liz Cheney as conference chair because of her opposition to Trump, Taylor and Evan McMullin organized a group of more than 150 Republicans—including former governors, senators, congressmen, cabinet secretaries, and party leaders—to issue "A Call for American Renewal" threatening to form a third party if the Republican Party did not reform itself.

In June 2021, Taylor and McMullin launched a new organization, the Renew America Movement (RAM). The organization's stated goal was to recruit candidates in the 2022 elections to challenge candidates who continue to support Trump. In October 2021, Taylor and former New Jersey Governor Christine Todd Whitman published an opinion piece in The New York Times announcing that RAM would be supporting "rational" Republicans and moderate Democrats in the 2022 midterm elections, with the goal of steering power away from members of the GOP who are pro-Trump. Taylor's group subsequently released a statement that they planned to raise "tens of millions" of dollars to defend a designated slate of House and Senate candidates in order to counter Donald Trump's hold on the Republican Party.

In July 2022, Taylor merged his organization—Renew America Movement—with several others to launch a new political party in the United States, alongside former nationally known Democrats, Independents, and Republicans. In announcing the new Forward Party, Taylor told Reuters: "The fundamentals have changed. When other third party movements have emerged in the past it's largely been inside a system where the American people aren't asking for an alternative. The difference here is we are seeing an historic number of Americans saying they want one."

=== Havana syndrome incidents ===
In a 60 Minutes interview in February 2022, Taylor recounted that he had two experiences that matched the Havana syndrome symptoms. Taylor also indicated that he was aware of a cabinet-level official who had similar episodes.

=== Second Trump administration ===
Despite his opposition to Donald Trump, Taylor urged conservatives to join his second administration after he was re-elected. In the New York Times the day after the 2024 election, Taylor wrote that "Republicans with integrity cannot turn away from the difficult years ahead," urging them to "step forward and serve in the executive branch out of dedication to the principles that hold this country together, however tenuously."

==== Security clearance revocation ====
On April 9, 2025, Trump signed an executive order revoking security clearances for Taylor and close associates, including individuals at the University of Pennsylvania, and for Chris Krebs, the first Director of the Cybersecurity and Infrastructure Security Agency, as well as ordering investigations into the work of both men during their time in office. At the time of the executive order, the University of Pennsylvania did not conduct classified research and had no security clearance.

== Political affiliations ==
Although Taylor was a lifelong member of the Republican Party, he donated to the Barack Obama campaign in the 2008 presidential election. He has said that he was "gunning for John McCain... [but] wanted to be able to tell [his] kids that... [he] supported the first Black president of the United States."

In May 2022, Taylor announced he was leaving the Republican Party over what he claimed was its espousal of "great replacement theory" rhetoric, especially in the wake of the Buffalo shooting. He stated that "it's become glaringly obvious that my party no longer represents conservative values but in fact poses a threat to them—and to America." Taylor is now a member of the Forward Party.

== See also ==
- List of former Trump administration officials who endorsed Joe Biden

== Writings ==
=== Articles ===
- Anonymous (September 5, 2018). "I Am Part of the Resistance Inside the Trump Administration". The New York Times. ISSN 0362-4331.
- Taylor, Miles (October 28, 2020). "A Statement: Why I'm no longer 'Anonymous'". Medium.
- Taylor, Miles (April 3, 2026). "In private, Trump has plans for unspeakable violence. I know because he told me". The i Paper.
- Taylor, Miles (May 1, 2026). "In private, Trump allies tell me they’re done. I know why they’re scared to speak up". The i Paper.

=== Books ===
- Anonymous (2019). A Warning. New York: Twelve. ISBN 978-1-5387-1847-6.
- Taylor, Miles (2023). Blowback: A Warning to Save Democracy from Trump's Revenge. New York: Atria Books. ISBN 978-1-6680-1600-8.
