= James H. Percival =

American government official

James Percival
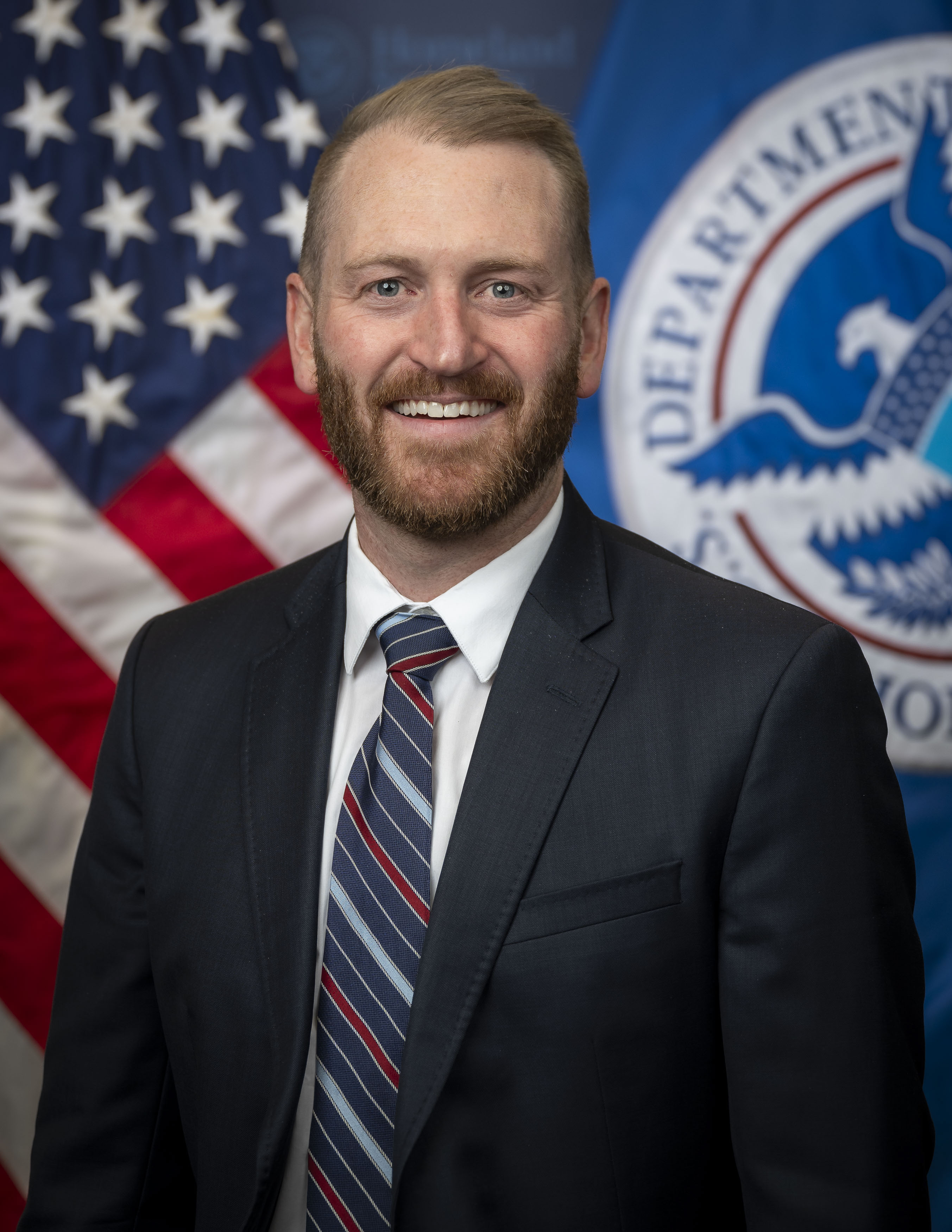
- Official portrait, 2025

General Counsel of Homeland Security
- Incumbent
- Assumed office December 22, 2025
- President: Donald Trump
- Preceded by: Jonathan Meyer

Personal details
- Born: James Hamilton Percival
- Education: University of California, Santa Barbara (BA), University of Virginia School of Law (JD)

James Hamilton Percival is an American lawyer and public servant. Since December 2025 he has served as General Counsel at the U.S. Department of Homeland Security.

== Early life and education ==
Percival received his undergraduate degree from the University of California, Santa Barbara. He earned his Juris Doctor from the University of Virginia School of Law. Between college and law school, he was a missionary in South America.

== Career ==
Percival served as chief of staff to Ashley Moody when she was Attorney General of Florida. He also served as a member of Florida's State Retirement Commission.

In March 2025, President Donald Trump officially nominated Percival to be General Counsel for the U.S. Department of Homeland Security (DHS). During his confirmation hearing, he testified that he saw FEMA personnel skip over certain hurricane victims because of their political affiliation as an example of what he described as DHS being "off-mission." On December 18, 2025, the Senate confirmed Percival's nomination in a 53–43 vote.

In January 2026, Percival wrote an opinion piece in the Wall Street Journal arguing that Immigration and Customs Enforcement (ICE) agents were not required to follow the Fourth Amendment to the U.S. Constitution.

In February 2026, Percival told Congress that he and then-Secretary Kristi Noem did not seek to end or conclude any ongoing investigation's by the agency's inspector general.

Percival defended then-Assistant Secretary Tricia McLaughlin after she faced accusations of improperly awarding government contracts to her husband's company.

In April 2026, Percival said he received death threats while speaking at an event at the University of California, Los Angeles.

In May 2026, Percival issued a memo encouraging DHS personnel to use existing authorities more aggressively to increase asylum-related fraud cases.

== Personal life ==
Percival is married and has six children.
