= Dimitri Kusnezov =

American physicist

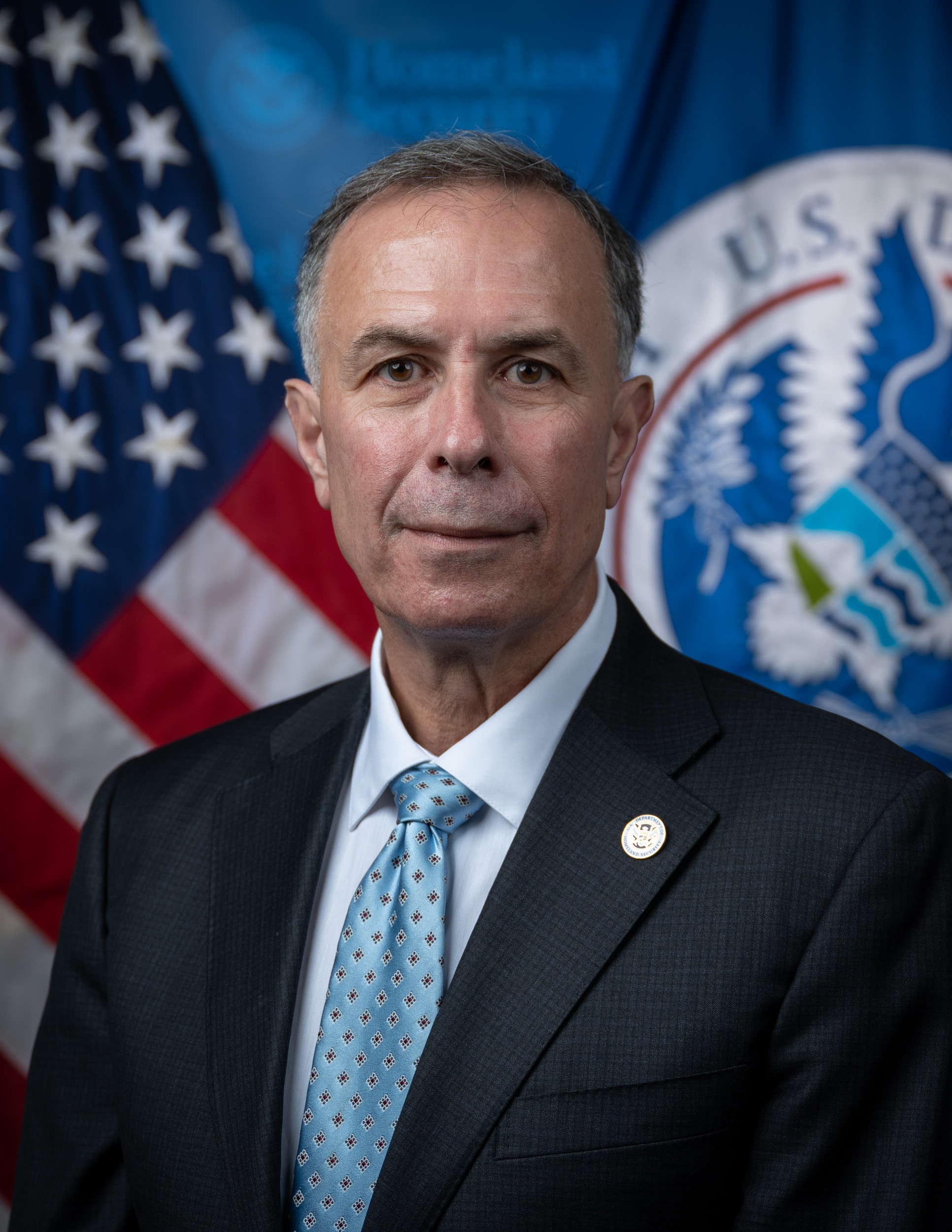

Under Secretary of Homeland Security for Science and Technology
- In office September 29, 2022 – January 20, 2025
- President: Joe Biden
- Preceded by: Reginald Brothers
- Succeeded by: Pedro Allende

Personal details
- Education: University of California, Berkeley (AB, AB); Princeton University (MA, PhD)

Dimitri Kusnezov is an American theoretical physicist and academic who served as the fifth Under Secretary of Homeland Security for Science and Technology from 2022 to 2025. He has led science and technology enterprises broadly, supporting high consequence decisions for US nuclear weapons, nuclear and national security, to open science, law enforcement and emergency response and management. He has focused on emerging technologies, from AI, quantum, gene editing, autonomy to HPC, delivering first of their kind, world leading technologies into practice. He has published over 160 research papers and articles and has over 4000 citations according to Google Scholar and edited two books.

== Early life and Academic Career ==
Kusnezov was born in Oakland, to parents Evelyne (Kourkene) and Nikita Kusnezov, and was raised in Los Altos Hills, California. He graduated from Gunn High School in Palo Alto and went on to attend the University of California, Berkeley, graduating with highest honors with dual A.B. degrees in Physics and in Pure Mathematics in 1982. After earning his bachelor’s degrees, he worked in 1983 as a researcher at the German Institut für Kernphysik, at the now named Forschungszentrum Jülich national laboratory for a year conducting research in nuclear physics. He left in the fall of 1983 to attend Princeton University as a graduate student in Physics, earning a Master's degree in 1985 and a PhD in theoretical nuclear physics in 1988. Kusnezov took a postdoctoral position at Michigan State University’s National Superconducting Cyclotron Laboratory in 1988 and then joined the Physics Department as an Instructor in early 1990. He left to join Yale University Physics Department in June 1991 as an Assistant Professor and was promoted to Associate Professor in 1996. He served as a visiting professor in numerous universities around the world. He left the Yale in September 2001 to transition to public service initially at the newly formed National Nuclear Security Administration (NNSA), but continued as a visiting researcher at Yale until his nomination by President Obama in 2016 to lead the U.S. nuclear weapons program. The U.S. Senate Arms Services Committee, reported by Senator McCain, referred him to the full Senate on July 12, 2016.

== Nuclear Weapons and Nuclear Security ==
Kusnezov joined the Accelerated Strategic Computing Initiative (ASCI) program in September 2001, the simulation arm of U.S. Nuclear Weapons program that informs all the major decisions given the U.S. nuclear testing moratorium passed by Congress and signed by President George H.W. Bush. He became the Director in July 2003 of the approximately $740M/yr program, transitioning it from an initiative to a rebranded and restructured program now called the Advanced Simulation and Computing Program (ASC). He was commissioned into the Senior Executive Service in August 2005, and also assumed the additional role as acting Director of the roughly $300M/yr Office of Defense Science in September 2005. In March 2008, he became Director, Office of Research & Development for National Security Science and Technology, a roughly $3.5B/yr portfolio that included the research, development, test and evaluation programs for nuclear weapons as well as the lab directed R&D (LDRD) and Work for Others (WFO) programs. In October 2010, Kusnezov became the second Chief Scientist for the NNSA, a roughly $10–15B/yr enterprise with about 40,000 employees and lab scientists, where he served until late 2018. During this time, he served in additional roles as the NNSA Chief Information Officer in 2013, the Director of the NNSA Office of Science and Policy from 2010-2015 and as Senior Advisor to the Secretary of Energy, Ernest Moniz, from 2013-2017. During this time in NNSA, he was responsible for delivering the world’s fastest supercomputers for many years with innovative and first of their kind architectural innovations. This includes delivering on the DOE 10-year grand challenge for a 100 Teraflop supercomputer in 2005, a targeted speed-up of one million times, the novel Blue Gene supercomputer architecture family, and the first petaflop supercomputer, among others. Kusnezov moved to define the NNSA labs as National Security Labs, a vision that was officially signed by Secretary Bodman in 2008. He architected, led and brought to fruition in 2010 the first multiagency governance of the nation’s national security science and technology base, instituting the Mission Executive Council and a Governance Charter signed at the Cabinet level by the Departments of Defense, Energy, Homeland Security and the Director of National Intelligence. This was subsequently codified into law by Congress in 2013. He developed a Minority Serving Institutions program focusing on STEM based consortia of Historically Black Colleges and Universities with Department of Energy laboratories, with an initial focus on cybersecurity. He created the ‘Predictive Capability Framework’ in 2006, the integrating approach to the science basis for the US nuclear weapons enterprise and the life-extension programs, underpinned by verification, classes or small and large scale experiments, and uncertainty quantification. It remains a guiding framework for program planning. He architected and launched a strategic partnership on foreign nuclear weapons assessment in 2009 between US Intelligence agencies and the Department of Energy that continues to bring scientific rigor into intelligence fields. He created and launched the Tri-Lab Capacity Computing initiative in 2006, still in place as a transformative measure representing a cost savings to NNSA of 50% in the total cost of ownership of computers and requiring standardization of tools and methods across the NNSA labs – something again not done prior. In late 2018, Secretary Perry approved Kusnezov for the new role as the first Deputy Under Secretary for Artificial Intelligence and Technology for the U.S. Department of Energy.

== Selected publications ==
- 1999, D Kusnezov, A Bulgac, G Do Dang, Quantum levy processes and fractional kinetics, Physical review letters 82 (6), 1136
- 1996, VP Antropov, MI Katsnelson, BN Harmon, M Van Schilfgaarde, Spin dynamics in magnets: Equation of motion and finite temperature effects, Physical Review B 54 (2), 1019
- 1990, D Kusnezov, A Bulgac, W Bauer, Canonical ensembles from chaos, Annals of Physics 204 (1), 155-185
