= Elizabeth Neumann =

American security expert (born 1979)

- Born: 1979
- Education: Trinity Christian Academy, University of Texas at Austin (Bachelor's degree)
- Occupations: National Security Expert; ABC News Contributor; non-profit Board member; Consultant
- Political party: Independent / former Republican

Elizabeth Neumann (born 1979) is an American former homeland security official. In the Trump administration she served from February 2017 to April 2020 as a senior advisor and Deputy Chief of Staff of the Department of Homeland Security (DHS) to DHS Secretary John Kelly and Acting DHS Secretary Elaine Duke, and as DHS Assistant Secretary for Threat Prevention and Security Policy to DHS Secretary Kirstjen Nielsen, Acting DHS Secretary Kevin McAleenan, and Acting DHS Secretary Chad Wolf. She served on the Homeland Security Council staff in the George W. Bush administration starting in 2003.

== Early life and education ==
Neumann grew up in McKinney, Texas, graduated from Trinity Christian Academy, and earned a bachelor's degree in Government Studies from the University of Texas at Austin.

== Career ==
Neumann served during the George W. Bush administration. Initially she worked on President Bush's Faith-Based and Community Initiatives at the Departments of Housing and Urban Development and Education. From 2003 to 2006, Neumann worked at the White House as part of the staff of the Homeland Security Council post 9/11. The job included working with the different government security agencies to counter terrorism. She was part of a team of officials that helped advance several anti-terrorism measures. Neumann served as an executive assistant to Homeland Security Advisor John A. Gordon, shifting eventually to serve as associate director of the Domestic Counterterrorism Directorate. Neumann left the Bush administration and worked as a senior advisor to the Program Manager for the Information Sharing Environment, Office of the Director of National Intelligence, where she helped author and coordinate the implementation of key components of the 2007 White House National Strategy for Information Sharing. She also worked as a contractor helping businesses with cyber security and risk assessments, and with DHS in developing threat assessments and in restructuring and opening regional field offices.

Neumann joined DHS Secretary John Kelly as his Deputy Chief of Staff in 2017; and she served in the same capacity under Acting DHS Secretary Elaine Duke. In 2018, Neumann became DHS Assistant Secretary for Counterterrorism and Threat Prevention, where she served until her resignation in April 2020. In that capacity, she was responsible for leading efforts to formulate DHS policy on emerging threats, among the major threats was violence perpetrated by right-wing extremists. Neumann pushed for the department to do more to prevent domestic terror attacks, and worked with bipartisan support in Congress to get new funding that helped bolster and rebrand the DHS Office of Community Partnerships into the Office of Targeted Violence and Terrorism Prevention (TVTP) within DHS. She testified before Congress that DHS saw extremism building to the ‘doorstep of another 9/11.’

Ron Lauder suggested to Donald Trump that the United States purchase Greenland which was discussed in the White House Situation Room as a trade involving Puerto Rico according to Elizabeth Neumann.

== Public life ==
In August 2020 she made an ad for Republican Voters Against Trump in which she endorsed the presidential candidacy of Joe Biden and called Trump's language and actions "racist," saying she considers "America is less safe" due to Trump's failure in leadership.

In 2020, Neumann, along with over 130 other former Republican national security officials, signed a statement that asserted that President Trump was unfit to serve another term, and "To that end, we are firmly convinced that it is in the best interest of our nation that Vice President Joe Biden be elected as the next President of the United States, and we will vote for him."

As a counterterrorism expert, Neumann became an outspoken critic of the Trump administration's rhetoric and lack of action regarding domestic terrorism policy and warnings of potential threats, warning of attacks by white nationalists and other radical extremists and the groundwork laid for further attacks in the months and years to come. In early 2021, Neumann served as the co-director of the Republican Accountability Project, a group under Republicans for the Rule of Law's Defending Democracy Together that "pledges $50 million in an effort to defend Republican impeachment supporters" and "knock down seditionists" in primary elections. ABC News hired Neumann in 2021 as a contributor on national and homeland security.

Neumann is a board member of the National Immigration Forum. She has criticized the Trump administration's efforts to lower refugee admissions, stating the actions "harmed National Security." Among Neumann's papers are "Robust Refugee Programs Aid National Security", "Immigration is Not a Security Threat", and "Rescinding the Travel Ban Will Improve National Security."

== Personal life ==
Neumann has described herself as "first and foremost a follower of Jesus Christ," and her 2016 decision to vote for Trump as "primarily because of the pro-life issue." She is married and has two children.

== Publications ==
- Neumann, Elizabeth (April 23, 2024). Kingdom of Rage: The Rise of Christian Extremism and the Path Back to Peace. Worthy Books. ISBN 978-1546002055.
