= Republicans for the Rule of Law =

Conservative anti-Trump political group in the US

Republicans for the Rule of Law is the principal initiative of the conservative, anti-Donald Trump political group Defending Democracy Together, founded by Bill Kristol, Mona Charen, Linda Chavez, Sarah Longwell, and Andy Zwick in 2019. The project, a 501(c)(4) (social welfare) group, created an advertising campaign to pressure Republican members of Congress to "demand the facts" about the Trump-Ukraine scandal during the impeachment inquiry against Donald Trump.

== Group ==
The group describes itself as "life-long Republicans dedicated to defending the institutions of our republic and upholding the rule of law" and primarily consists of traditionally Republican lawyers. The group's legal advisory board has included Charles Fried (1935–2024), who served as U.S. Solicitor General under Ronald Reagan, Wendell Willkie II, grandson of 1940 Republican presidential nominee Wendell Willkie and Chris Truax, the group's spokesman. Former Republican U.S. Senator Slade Gorton of Washington state also served on the group's board.

== Ad campaign ==
As the movement to impeach Trump got underway, the group spent over $1 million running cable television advertisements on Fox News and MSNBC, calling on Republicans to "demand the facts" about Trump and Ukraine. The ad campaign, which included digital as well as television advertising, targeted a dozen Republican Senators as well as House swing districts currently represented by Republicans, including Fred Upton (Michigan), Brian Fitzpatrick (Pennsylvania), Will Hurd (Texas), Jaime Herrera Beutler (Washington), and Mark Amodei (Nevada). The group's ad campaigns also accused Trump of abusing his office to enrich himself, citing Trump's attempt to hold the 2020 G7 summit at Trump's own Doral resort, and encouraged Republicans to publicly oppose Trump's efforts to solicit foreign interference in U.S. elections. The ads aired on programs that attract Republican voters, including Fox & Friends. Washington Post columnist Jennifer Rubin calls the ads "devastating" to Trump's credibility.

== Affiliated organizations ==
In 2020, the organization launched Republican Voters Against Trump for the 2020 U.S. presidential election cycle.

== See also ==
- The Lincoln Project
