= Andrew Yang =

American businessman and politician (born 1975)

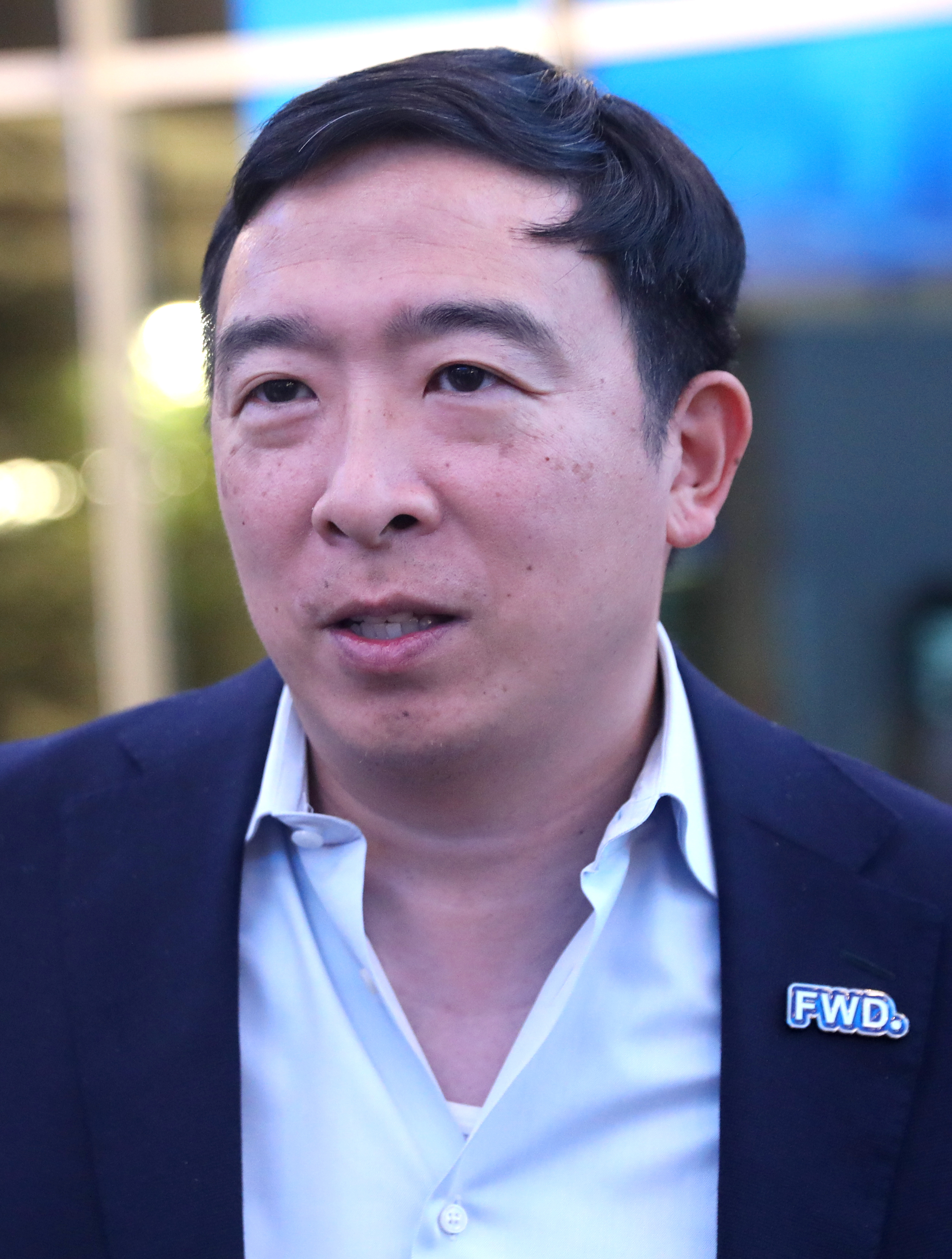
- Yang in 2023

Chair of the Forward Party
- Incumbent
- Assumed office July 28, 2022 Serving with Christine Todd Whitman and Michael S. Willner
- Preceded by: Position established

Personal details
- Born: January 13, 1975 (age 51) Schenectady, New York, U.S.
- Party: Democratic (until 2021); Forward (since 2021) (Note: New York voters register their party affiliation with the state. Because the Forward Party is not a recognized party in New York, Yang is a registered independent.)
- Spouse: Evelyn Lu (m. 2011)
- Children: 2
- Education: Brown University (BA); Columbia University (JD)

Chinese name
- Traditional Chinese: 楊安澤
- Simplified Chinese: 杨安泽
Transcriptions
Standard Mandarin
- Hanyu Pinyin: Yáng Ānzé
- Wade–Giles: Yang2 An1-tse2

Andrew Yang (born January 13, 1975) is an American businessman, lobbyist and political commentator. He founded the political party and action committee Forward Party in 2021, for which he serves as co-chair alongside former New Jersey Governor Christine Todd Whitman and Michael S. Willner.

The son of Taiwanese American immigrants, Yang was born and raised in New York state. He graduated from Brown University and Columbia Law School, and was a lawyer and entrepreneur before being a candidate in the 2020 Democratic Party presidential primaries. His signature policy, a monthly universal basic income (UBI) of $1,000, was intended to offset job displacement by automation.

Media outlets described Yang as both a dark horse and a novelty candidate during the 2020 election cycle, rising from relatively unknown to a major competitor in the race. Yang qualified for and participated in seven of the first eight Democratic debates. His supporters, colloquially known as the "Yang Gang", included several high-profile public figures and celebrities. Yang suspended his campaign on February 11, 2020, shortly after the New Hampshire primary. Afterward, he joined CNN as a political commentator, created the political nonprofit organization Humanity Forward, and unsuccessfully ran for mayor of New York City in the 2021 Democratic primaries.

On October 4, 2021, Andrew Yang left the Democratic Party to become an independent politician, faulting what he characterized as a system stuck in increasing polarization, saying that he is "more comfortable trying to fix the system than being a part of it". Later in October 2021, Yang founded the Forward Party, a centrist political party with a stated goal of providing an alternative to the two major U.S. political parties.

== Early life and education ==
Andrew Yang was born on January 13, 1975, to a Taiwanese American family in Schenectady, New York. His parents emigrated from Taiwan to the United States in the 1960s and met in graduate school at the University of California, Berkeley. Yang is of Hoklo Taiwanese descent. His father graduated with a PhD in physics and worked in the research labs of IBM and General Electric, generating over 50 patents in his career. His mother graduated with a master's degree in statistics before becoming a systems administrator at a university, and later an artist. Yang has an older brother, Lawrence, who is a psychology professor at New York University.

Yang grew up in Somers, a town in Westchester County, New York. He attended Phillips Exeter Academy, a private boarding school in Exeter, New Hampshire. Yang was part of the 1992 U.S. national debate team, which competed at the world championships in London. He graduated from Phillips Exeter Academy in 1992.

Yang received a Bachelor of Arts degree (with a major in economics and political science) from Brown University in 1996 and a Juris Doctor degree from Columbia University in 1999. He was an editor of the Columbia Law Review when he was a law student.

== Business career ==
=== Early career ===
After graduating from law school, Yang began his career as a corporate attorney at Davis Polk & Wardwell in New York City. Yang later described the job as "a pie-eating contest, and if you won, your prize was more pie". He left the law firm after five months, which he has called "the five worst months of my life".

In February 2000, Yang joined his office mate, Jonathan Philips, in launching Stargiving, a website for celebrity-affiliated philanthropic fundraising. The startup had some initial success, but folded in 2002 as the dot-com bubble burst. Yang became involved in other ventures, including a party-organizing business. From 2002 to 2005, he served as the vice president of a healthcare startup.

=== Manhattan Prep ===
After working in the healthcare industry for four years, Yang left MMF Systems to join his friend Zeke Vanderhoek at a small test preparation company, Manhattan Prep. In 2006, Vanderhoek asked Yang to take over as CEO. While Yang was CEO, the company primarily provided GMAT test preparation. It expanded from five to 69 locations and was acquired by Kaplan, Inc. in December 2009. Yang resigned as the company's president in early 2012. Yang later said it was during his time at Manhattan Prep that he became a millionaire.

In September 2019 testimony before the New York City Commission on Gender Equity, former employee Kimberly Watkins testified that Yang had fired her because he felt that she would not work as hard after getting married. Yang has denied the allegations. In an appearance on The View, Yang said, "I've had so many phenomenal women leaders that have elevated me and my organizations at every phase of my career, and if I was that kind of person I would never have had any success."

In November, a former employee of Yang's at Manhattan GMAT filed a lawsuit against him for allegedly paying her less than her male co-workers and subsequently firing her for asking for a raise. Yang and another female employee at the company disputed the anonymous woman's claim that she was in an equivalent position to the male co-workers she cited.

=== Venture for America ===
Following Kaplan's acquisition of Manhattan Prep in late 2009, Yang began to work on creating a new nonprofit fellowship program, Venture for America (VFA), which he founded in 2011. The organization was intended to find and train entrepreneurs to start businesses in economically stressed cities. VFA was launched with $200,000 and trained 40 graduates in 2012 and 69 in 2013. VFA added Columbus, Miami, San Antonio, and St. Louis in 2014, with a class of 106.

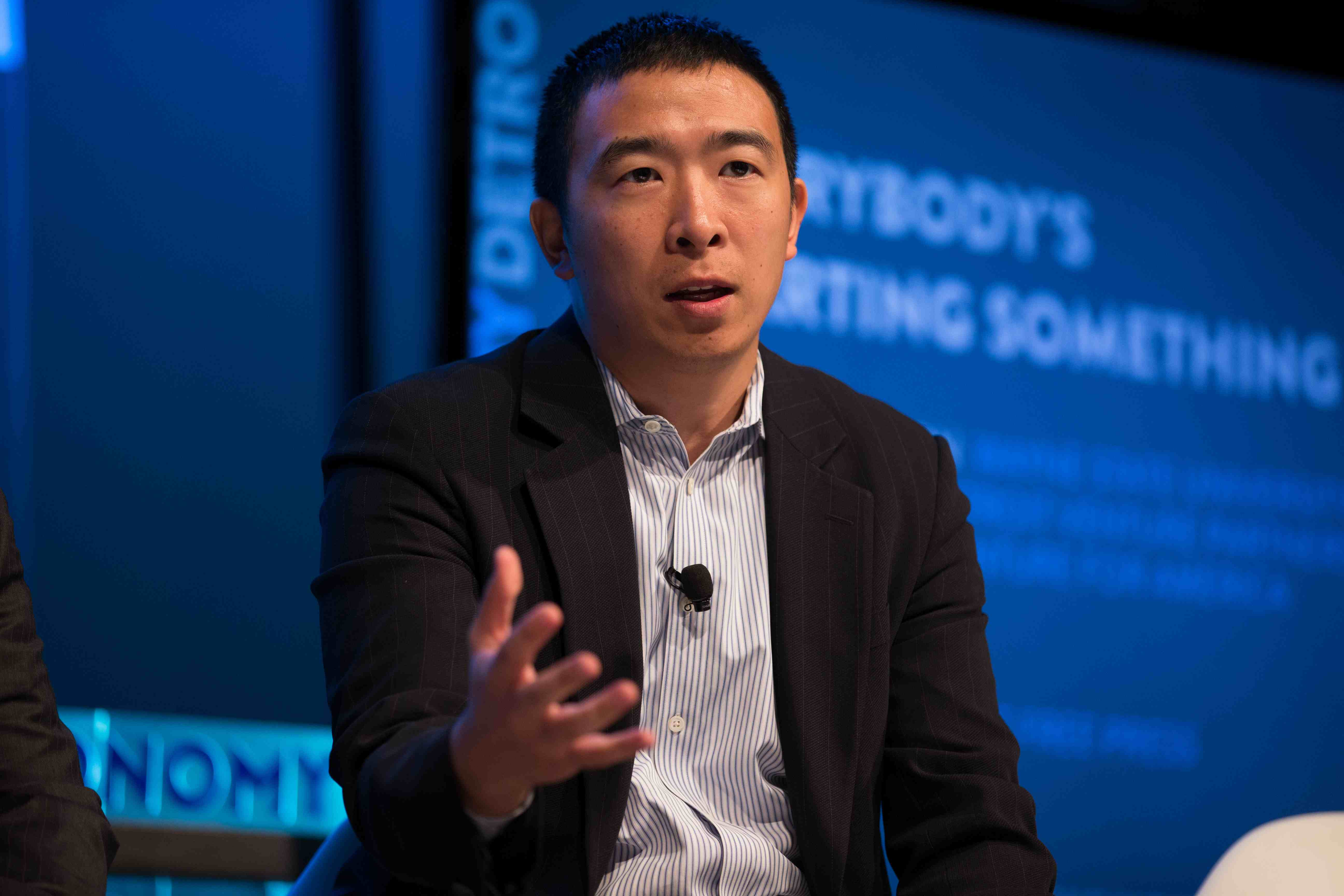
Yang speaks about urban entrepreneurship at the 2015 Techonomy Conference in Detroit, Michigan.

VFA quickly received national attention, including from the Obama administration. In 2011, Yang was recognized by "Champions of Change", a White House program that honored 500 people from every state for extraordinary work in their communities. In 2015, Yang was named a Presidential Ambassador for Global Entrepreneurship.

VFA has also been criticized for falling far short of its 100,000 job goal. An ABC News investigation found that VFA's own tally counted only 365 jobs created as of 2020 and of those The New York Times has found only 150 remain. Startup, a documentary film co-directed by Cynthia Wade and Cheryl Miller Houser about six startups in Detroit launched through VFA, was released in 2016. Yang stepped down from his position as CEO of VFA in March 2017 but continued to advise startups aligned with his signature policy of universal basic income during his presidential campaign.

=== Legendary Ventures ===
On August 10, 2022, Andrew Yang joined the advisory team at Legendary Ventures, an early stage venture capital firm, to drive strategic value across the firm's portfolio of consumer retail technology investments, alongside Fung Brothers Ventures.

=== Humanity Forward ===
On March 5, 2020, following the suspension of his presidential campaign, Yang announced that he was creating the nonprofit organization Humanity Forward Foundation, dedicated to promoting the ideas he campaigned on during his run, such as UBI, ranked voting, and data privacy. Yang also announced that the organization, together with The Spark of Hudson, forming HudsonUP, would give away $500,000 in UBI to the residents of Hudson, New York, to demonstrate UBI's benefits. After the Trump administration said it was considering a form of basic income in response to the pandemic, Yang announced that he had been in touch with the White House and had offered his team's services.

On March 20, CNN reported that Humanity Forward would soon spend $1 million on $1,000 monthly payments to 500 low-income households in the Bronx during the crisis. Yang tweeted that the number of households was expected to double with additional funding. On August 3, Yang announced that his organization was partnering with The $1K Project, an online network that helps identify families in need, who will be awarded three months of $1,000 payments. One of the network's founders describes the program as "a bridge to reemployment or other kinds of support."

Humanity Forward stated that it was not supporting or endorsing any candidate after Yang announced his run for mayor of New York City.

=== Lobby 3 ===
On February 17, 2022, Yang announced the launch of a Web3 community whose membership token fees would be used to fund lobbying work on behalf of Web3, blockchain, and cryptocurrency interests on Capitol Hill. The announcement has been met with some criticism in part due to Yang's continued launches of organizations in addition to the skepticism around cryptocurrency ventures.

=== Noble Mobile ===
In 2025, Yang launched Noble Mobile, a new wireless carrier that leases network access from T-Mobile and resells wireless service using a unique pricing and rewards model.

=== Net worth ===
Media outlets provided several estimates of Yang's net worth as of mid-2019: $1 million according to Forbes, between $834,000 and $2.4 million according to The Wall Street Journal, and between $3 million and $4 million according to Newsweek. In 2020 OpenSecrets estimated it being as low as $584,047.

== Political career ==
=== Work with the Obama administration ===
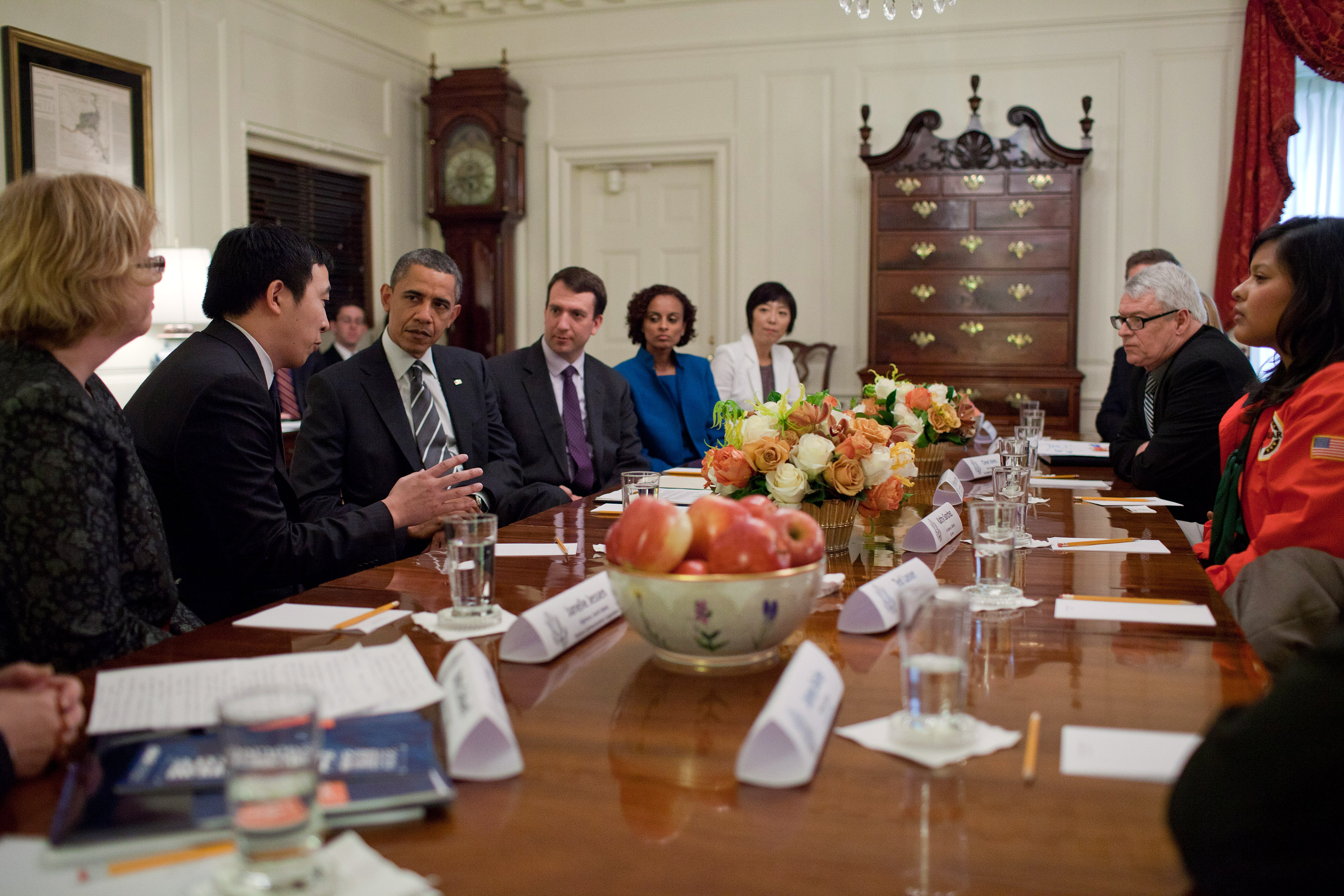
Yang meeting with President Obama at the White House in 2012

In 2012, Yang was named a "Champion of Change" by the Obama administration. In 2015, he was selected as a Presidential Ambassador for Global Entrepreneurship.

=== 2020 presidential campaign ===
Yang at 2019 Iowa State Fair in August 2019

On November 6, 2017, Yang filed with the Federal Election Commission (FEC) to run for President of the United States in 2020. The campaign began with a small initial staff working out of an apartment owned by Yang's mother. He ran on multiple slogans, including "Humanity First", "Make America Think Harder (MATH)", and "Not Left, Not Right, Forward." Initially considered a longshot, Yang's campaign gained significant momentum in February 2019 following an appearance on the popular podcast The Joe Rogan Experience. On the podcast, Yang emphasized several libertarian-leaning policies that contributed to his growing popularity, such as his support for decriminalizing drugs, data privacy rights, and ending corporate welfare. He later appeared on other podcasts and shows, including The Breakfast Club, The Ben Shapiro Show, and Real Time with Bill Maher where he continued advocating for criminal justice reform, cryptocurrency regulation clarity, and nuclear energy investment, ideas that aligned with the broader goals of individual freedom and market innovation. By March 2019, Yang had met the polling and fundraising thresholds to qualify for the first round of Democratic primary debates. In August 2019, he met the higher thresholds to qualify for the second round of Democratic debates. Later, he qualified for the third, fourth, fifth, and sixth Democratic debates but was unable to meet a polling threshold for the January 2020 debate. He did qualify for the February 2020 debate.

Yang's campaign focused largely on policy, in what Reuters described as a "technocratic approach." Yang regularly called Donald Trump a symptom of a wider problem in the economy, rather than the problem itself. According to The New York Times, Yang was known for doing interviews with conservative news outlets, and "although [Yang] tweets often, he almost never tweets about Mr. Trump." This approach was exemplified by one of Yang's campaign slogans: "Not Left, Not Right, Forward."

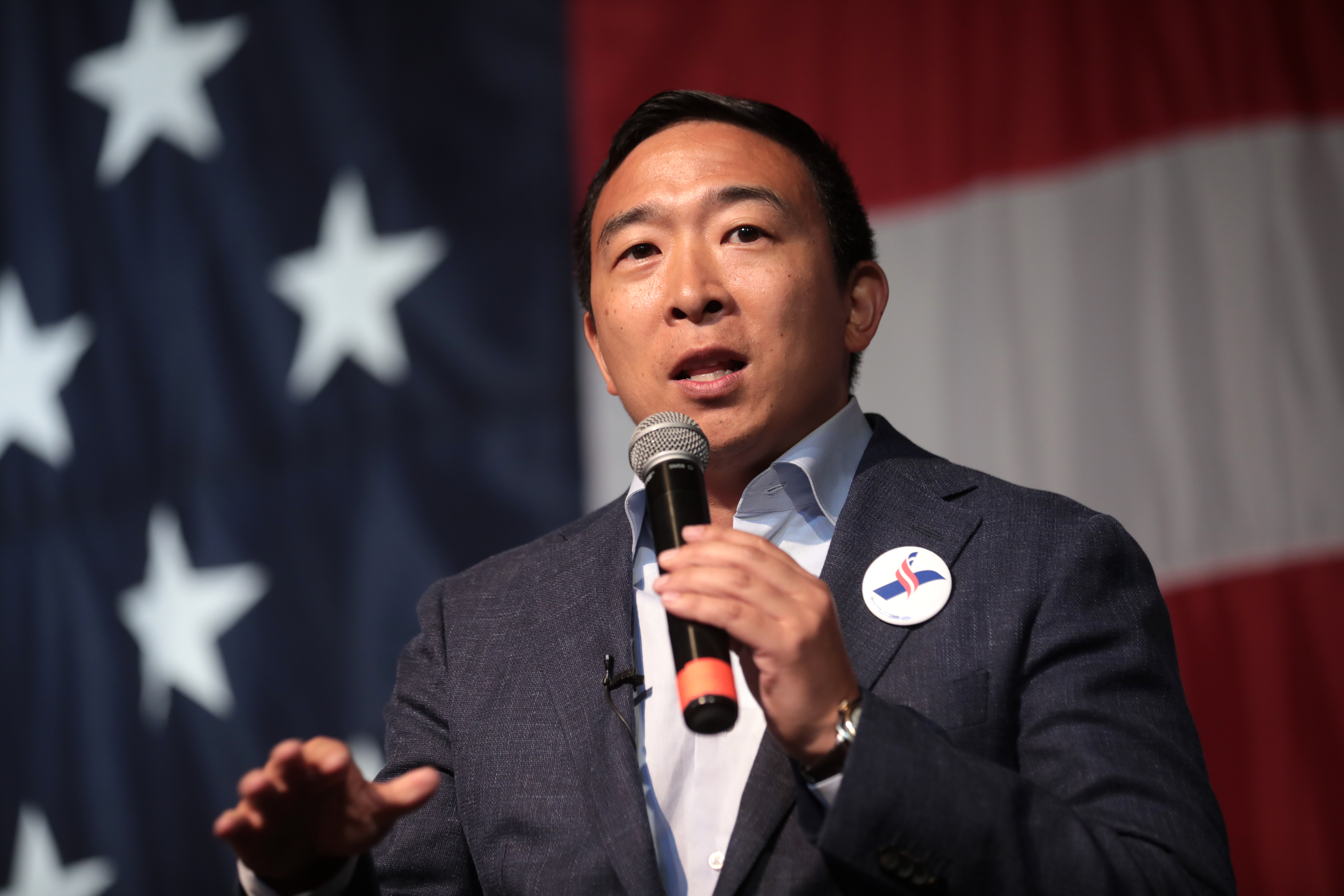
Yang speaks with attendees at the 2019 Iowa Democratic Wing Ding at Surf Ballroom in Clear Lake, Iowa.

Yang's campaign was known for its heavy reliance on Internet-based campaigning. The campaign was also known for its popularity online, with The New York Times calling Yang "The Internet's Favorite Candidate." His campaign supporters, known informally as the Yang Gang, brought attention to his campaign on Reddit, Facebook, Instagram, Twitter, and other social media platforms, through memes and viral campaigning. Several news outlets called Yang the most surprising candidate of the election cycle, going from relative obscurity to a national contender who outlasted several well-known politicians.

Yang also received several high-profile endorsements, such as from Tesla CEO Elon Musk.

Yang was at least the third American of East Asian descent to run for President of the United States, after Hiram Fong and Patsy Mink. According to BBC, he was "one of the first and most recognizable East Asian-Americans in history to run for president." He has said that he hoped his "campaign can inspire Asian Americans to be engaged in [politics]."

Yang dropped out of the presidential race on February 11, 2020. On March 10, 2020, Yang endorsed Joe Biden.

==== Media coverage ====
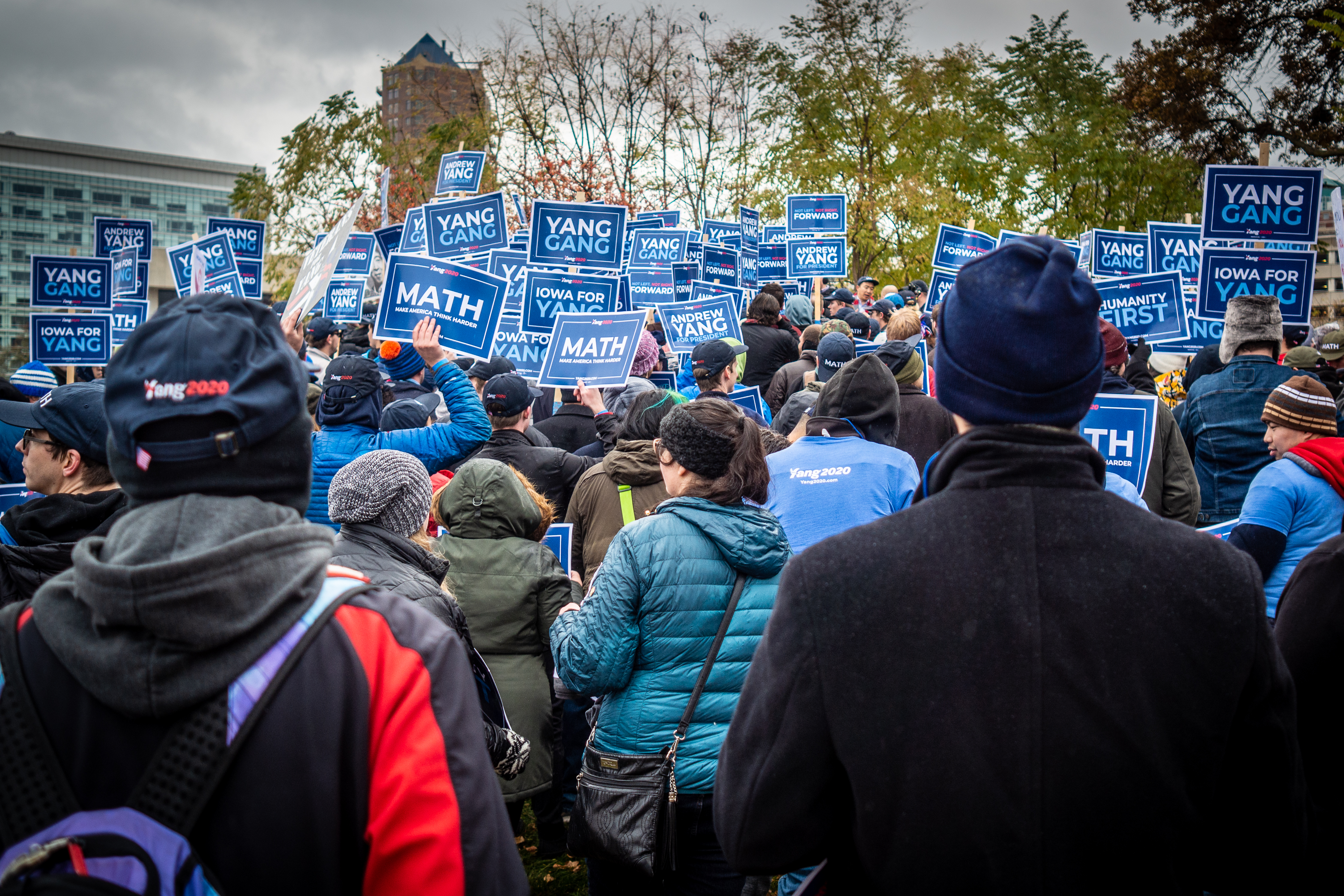
Yang's supporters form a crowd at the Liberty and Justice Celebration in Des Moines, Iowa. Yang is visible in the background.

On multiple occasions, news media disproportionally omitted Yang from election coverage or presented misleading data about his standing in polls. Incidents include cases of news outlets excluding Yang from lists of 2020 Democratic candidates. On August 29, 2019, a CNN infographic displaying the results of a poll included candidate Beto O'Rourke but not Yang, even though the poll showed Yang polling three times higher than O'Rourke. Yang supporters criticized media outlets for the disproportionately low coverage, including via Twitter hashtag #YangMediaBlackout.

==== Post-campaign ====
Yang dropped out of the presidential race on February 11, 2020, after a disappointing result in the New Hampshire primary. He announced to his supporters, "while we did not win this election, we are just getting started." Former Mayor Michael Bloomberg's counselor Howard Wolfson suggested that Yang "would make a very interesting candidate" for mayor of New York City; Yang said, "it's incredibly flattering to be thought of in that role.... We haven't ruled anything out at this point. I will say I'm more attracted to executive roles than legislative ones because I think you can get more done." On March 3, Yang reiterated his interest in the mayoralty to BuzzFeed News.

On February 19, Yang joined CNN as a political commentator. On March 10, the night of the Michigan Democratic primary, he endorsed Joe Biden. He said he understood Sanders' supporters' frustration, but that beating Trump was the most important objective. After his campaign, Yang created a podcast, Yang Speaks, where he discussed national and global issues with guest commentators. The podcast has since been folded into his newest brand, "Forward". The podcast continues to publish new episodes weekly.

On April 29, 2020, Yang announced that he was taking legal action against the New York State Board of Elections after the state election commission voted to cancel its presidential primary. The filing stated: "This unprecedented and unwarranted move infringes the rights of Plaintiffs and all New York State Democratic Party voters, of which there are estimated to be more than six million, as it fundamentally denies them the right to choose our next candidate for the office of President of the United States." In early May, the judge ruled in Yang's favor.

Initially left out of the list of confirmed speakers for the 2020 Democratic National Convention, Yang expressed his dissatisfaction on Twitter stating that he "kind of expected to speak" at the event. Yang spoke at the DNC on August 20, as the third speaker of the night.

In September 2020, the Biden campaign hired Yang as a member of its small business advisory council. In November 2020, Yang announced that he and his wife were moving to Atlanta to assist Raphael Warnock's and Jon Ossoff's campaigns in the January 2021 Georgia Senate runoff elections.

In August 2020, Yang revealed to The Carlos Watson Show that he had been in contact with Joe Biden's 2020 presidential campaign about a potential role in the Biden cabinet focusing on the issue of technology in society. In Yang's book Forward: Notes on the Future of Our Democracy, he writes that he interviewed with Biden's transition team for the role of United States Secretary of Labor. He also suggested that he serve in a new role, Secretary of Technology and Innovation.

=== 2021 New York City mayoral campaign ===
Logo for Yang's 2021 mayoral campaign

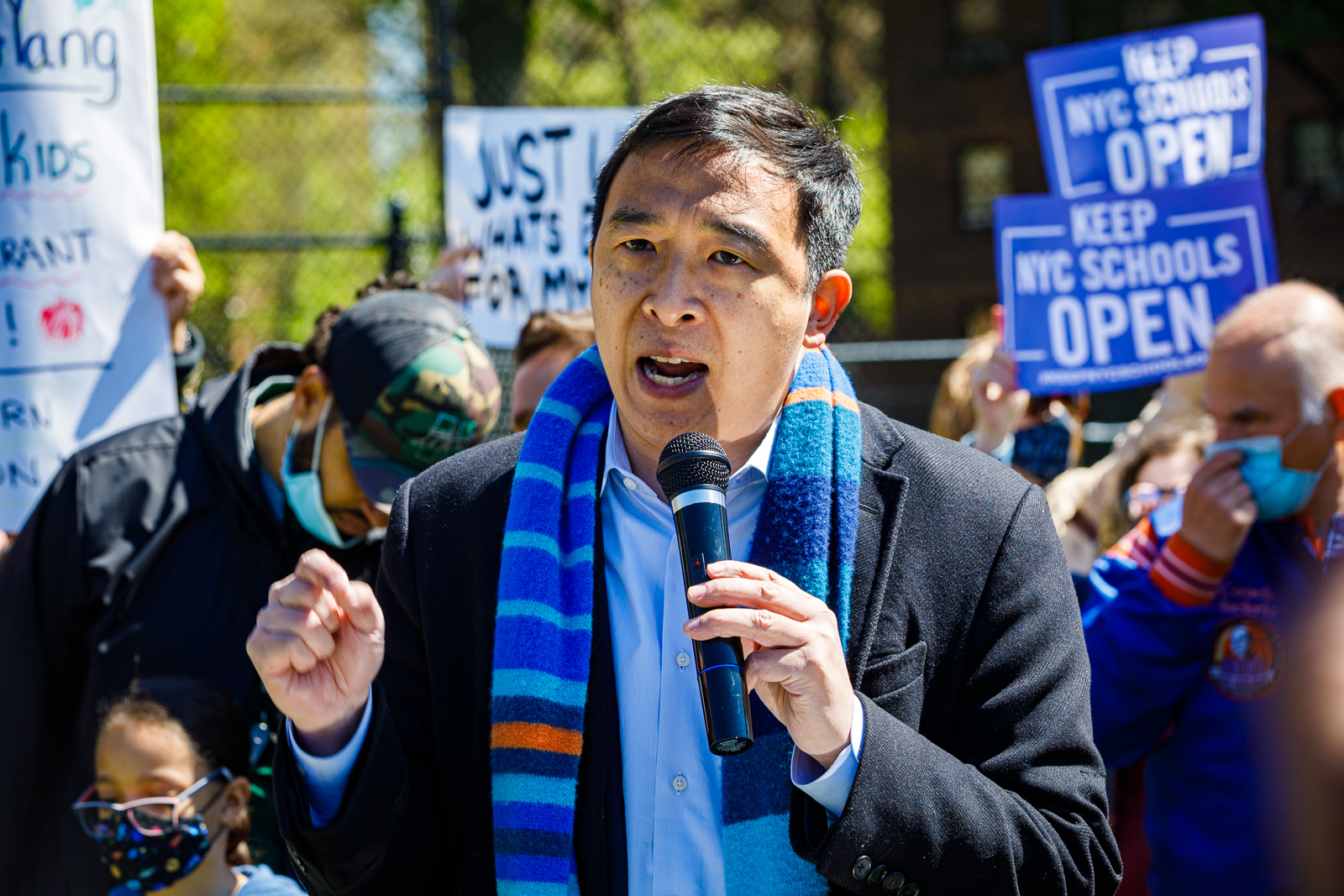
Yang campaigning for Mayor in May 2021

After the suspension of his presidential campaign in February 2020, Yang was considered a potential candidate in the 2021 New York City mayoral election to succeed the outgoing Bill de Blasio, with Yang himself expressing interest in seeking the office. Yang had reportedly told city leaders that he intended to run for mayor after polling obtained by the New York Post showed him leading the field, with 20% of New Yorkers saying they would support his candidacy. Yang filed paperwork to raise money for his mayoral campaign on December 23, 2020.

On January 8, 2021, Politico reported that Yang left New York City during the height of the COVID-19 pandemic to stay at his second home in New Paltz, New York. In an interview with The New York Times, he said, "Can you imagine trying to have two kids on virtual school in a two-bedroom apartment and then trying to do work yourself?" Critics saw his comments as tone-deaf, as many Americans had to balance work and family during COVID-19 lockdowns.

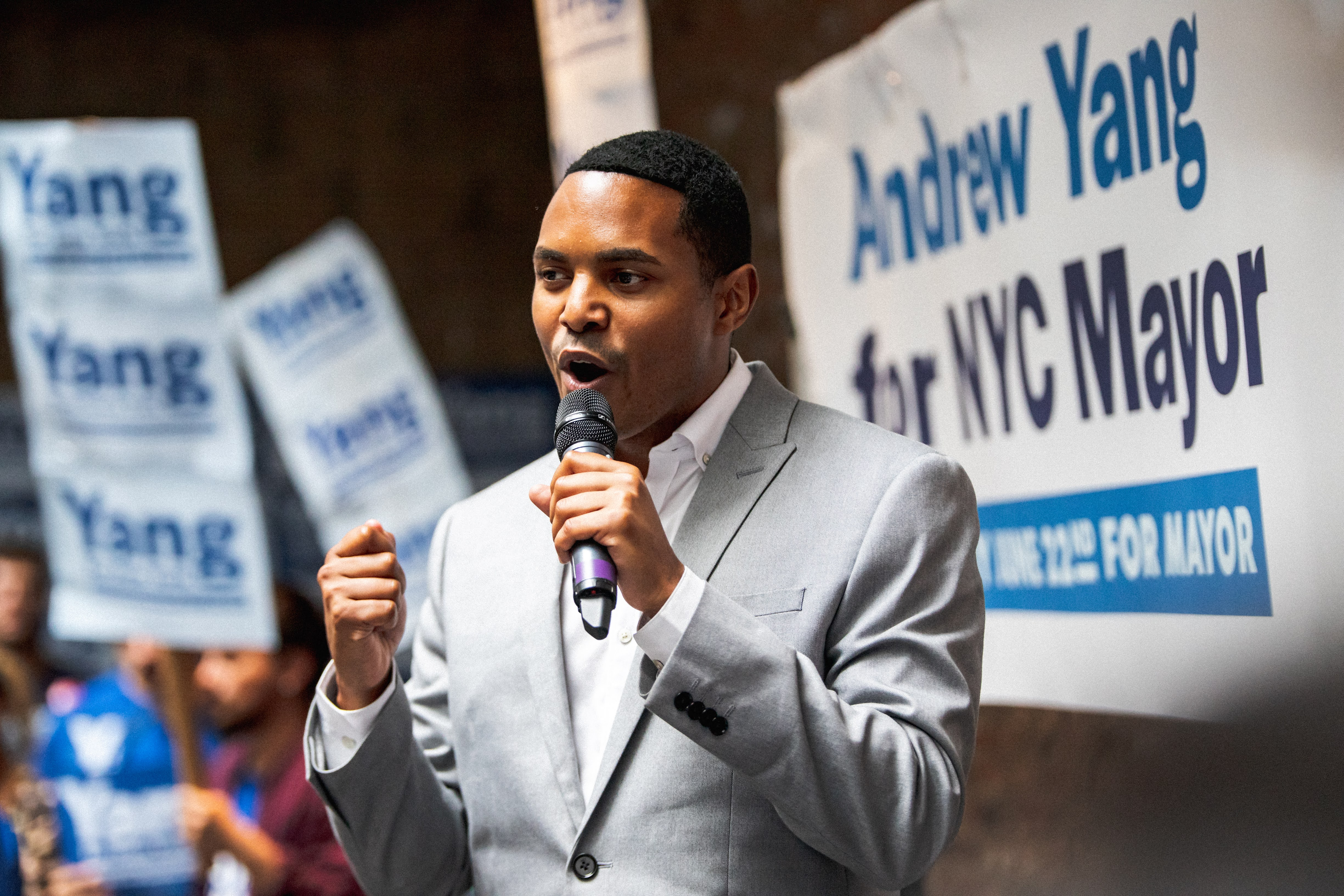
Ritchie Torres speaks at YangForNY rally in New York City on June 13, 2021.

Yang formally announced his bid for mayor on January 13, 2021, on Twitter. He himself had not voted in a municipal election since 2001. Yang was endorsed by U.S. Representatives Grace Meng and Ritchie Torres, as well as a number of other New York state and city political figures. He emerged as a front-runner after entering the race, and maintained a steady lead in polls; starting in May 2021, Yang's lead shrank as Eric Adams emerged as another front-runner. After placing fourth in first-place votes on election night, June 22, Yang conceded that he could not win the race and ended his campaign. Shortly after New York city mayor Eric Adams was indicted on federal corruption charges, Yang wrote an op-ed for Newsweek stating that back when he ran against Adams in the 2021 mayoral primary he expected the charges were coming.

=== Founding of the Forward Party ===
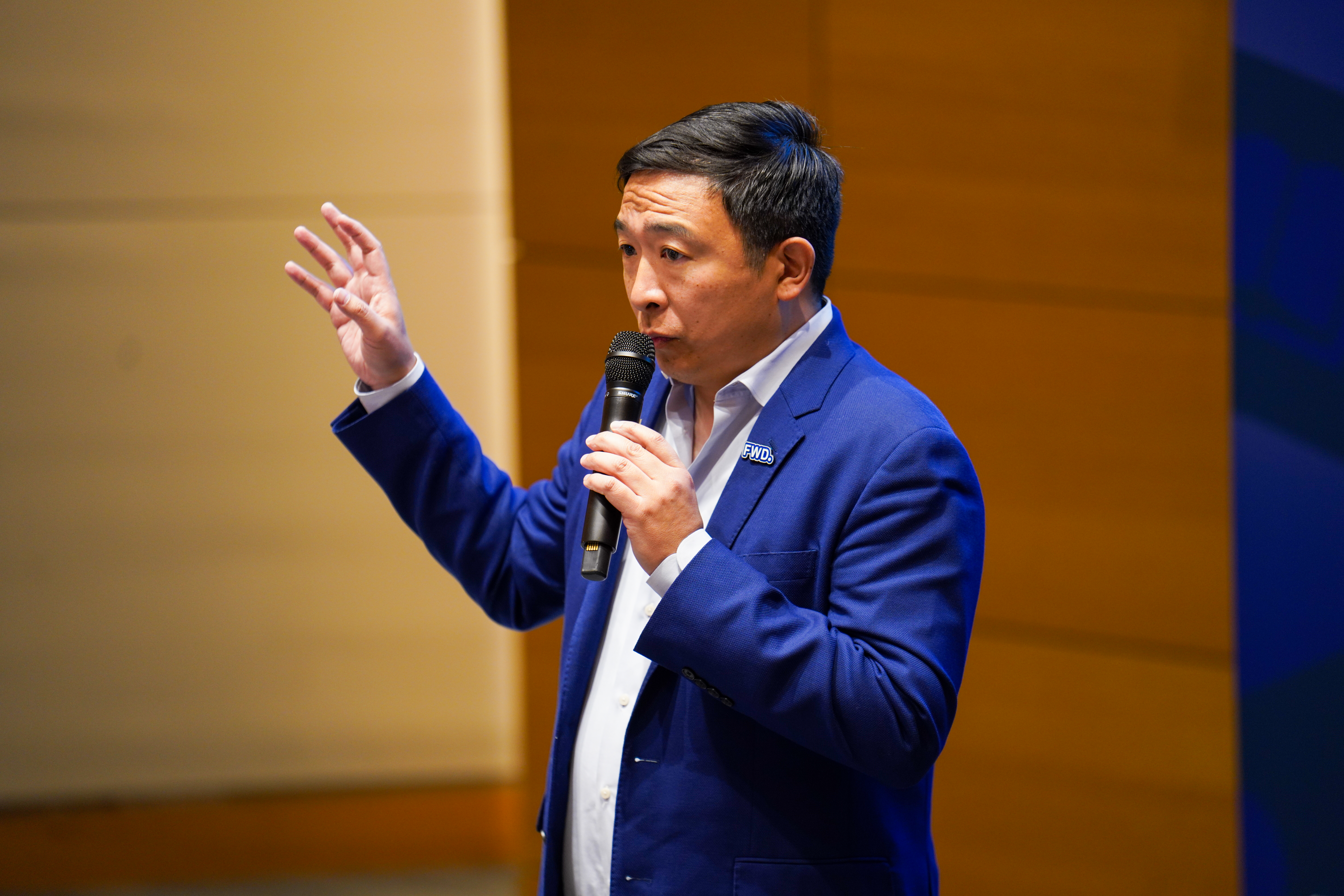
Yang speaking for Wharton Undergraduates in Public Policy at the University of Pennsylvania in April 2023

In Yang's 2021 book Forward: Notes on the Future of Our Democracy, he announced his intention to found a new third party, the Forward Party. On October 4, 2021, Yang announced on his blog that he had changed his voter registration from Democrat to Independent, saying he was "confident that no longer being a Democrat is the right thing"; the next day he announced the formation of the Forward Party.

Yang said the group would start as a social movement and political action committee, and eventually petition the FEC for formal recognition as a political party. On July 27, 2022, the Forward Party announced a merger with the Serve America Movement and the Renew America Movement to form a new political party. The party is officially registered as a minor party in Nevada and legal party status in Maine and Texas.

=== 2024 election cycle ===
In June 2023, Yang announced he had donated to Chris Christie's 2024 presidential campaign, in an effort to help qualify him for the upcoming Republican primary debates. Later in December, Yang endorsed Representative Andy Kim for the Democratic nomination in the 2024 New Jersey Senate election.

In January 2024, Yang endorsed Dean Phillips' 2024 presidential campaign. On January 18, Democratic US Representative Dean Phillips held campaign events with Yang in Manchester and Hanover, New Hampshire. Yang assisted Phillips' cause to gain ballot access for the Florida Democratic Party presidential primary after its cancellation and he told ABC News, "What's happening in Florida is important -- do we live in a democracy or not? If the Democrats can simply cancel their own primaries they should change their name to something else." In February 2024, it was reported that independent presidential candidate Robert F. Kennedy Jr. had asked Yang to be his running mate, but that Yang had been "noncommittal" about it. Kennedy reportedly still had Yang on his running mate short list during parts of March 2024, but attorney and entrepreneur Nicole Shanahan was ultimately chosen as Kennedy's running mate on March 26 of the same year.

After the first presidential debate on June 27, Yang encouraged the Democratic Party to nominate someone instead of Biden "before it's too late". Throughout the summer he encouraged Biden to drop out and for the Democratic Party to nominate someone different to defeat Trump in the general election. Yang later predicted that Biden would lose the election, with House and Senate Democrats heading for "historic" losses as well. On July 23, 2024, following Biden's withdrawal from the race, Yang endorsed Vice President Kamala Harris for president in a statement on social media. He later wrote an opinion piece for Newsweek after the Democratic Convention, in which he encouraged fellow independents to vote for Harris.

After Trump's win in the U.S. presidential election, Politico reached out to "Democratic thinkers", including Yang, to see what they thought the Party needed to do to improve itself. Yang proposed that the Democrats should apologize for "sandbagging Bernie Sanders in the 2016 primary", as well as for not having a competitive 2024 primary, name Dean Phillips the new chair of the DNC "as the only Democrat with the character to sacrifice his career for the good of the country." He also said they should "pledge never to back extremists in Republican primaries to boost a more beatable opponent in the general election," and that they should back the Local Journalism Sustainability Act to provide a path for local journalism, and the Fair Representation Act to fight gerrymandering, as well as "abandon policing cultural behaviors" to instead focus on improving Americans' standard of living; "In many ways, these all boil down to one thing: The Democratic Party should act more democratically."

In his book Hey Yang, Where's My Thousand Bucks?, published in February 2026, Yang teased another shot at the White House, noting, “the odds of my running again are high”. During a podcast interview with Scott Galloway and Anthony Scaramucci, Yang did not rule out a potential future presidential run.

== Other ventures ==
Yang was a contestant on the game reality show Nation's Dumbest, where he graduated in the third week.

== Personal life ==
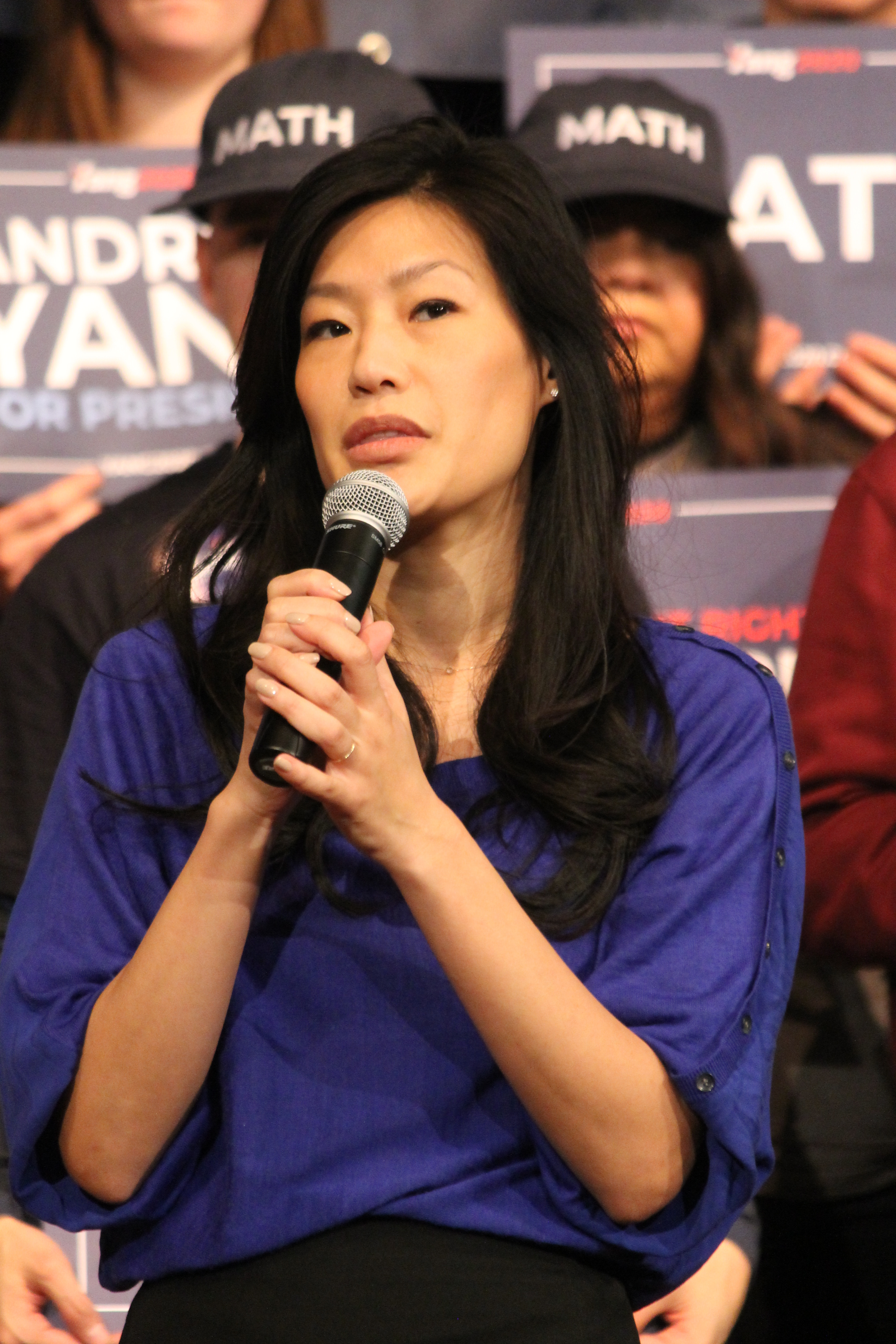
Yang's wife, Evelyn Yang, speaking at an event during his presidential campaign

Yang has been married to Evelyn Yang (née Lu, Chinese: 盧艾玲) since 2011; the couple have two sons. He has spoken about his older son Christopher, who is autistic, saying: "I'm very proud of my son and anyone who has someone on the spectrum in their family feels the exact same way."

The Yang family lives in a rental apartment in Hell's Kitchen, Manhattan, and also owns a home in New Paltz, New York, that they purchased in 2015. This became the family's primary residence during the early stages of the COVID-19 pandemic, and a focus of controversy during Yang's mayoral campaign. In 2019, Yang reported on his tax return that he rented out this home for 58 days to friends or on Airbnb.

Yang and his family attend the Reformed Church of New Paltz, which is near his home, and has identified Mark E. Mast as their pastor. He considers himself spiritual. Speaking about his faith at an interfaith town hall at Wartburg College, Yang said he "wouldn't be the first to say that [his] own journey is still in progress."

In 2020, Yang received the 2021 Vilcek Prize for Excellence in Public Service, awarded by the Vilcek Foundation.

On February 26, 2021, Yang stopped a physical assault on a photojournalist on the Staten Island Ferry by placing himself between the attacker and the journalist. The attacker recognized Yang, which deescalated the situation.

== Works ==
- Smart People Should Build Things: How to Restore Our Culture of Achievement, Build a Path for Entrepreneurs, and Create New Jobs in America. HarperCollins. February 4, 2014. ISBN 978-0062292049.
- The War on Normal People: The Truth About America's Disappearing Jobs and Why Universal Basic Income Is Our Future. Hachette Books. April 3, 2018. ISBN 978-0316414241.
- Forward: Notes on the Future of Our Democracy. Penguin Random House. October 5, 2021. ISBN 978-0-593-23865-3.
- The Last Election (a novel co-authored with Stephen Marche). Akashic Books. September 12, 2023. ISBN 978-1636141503.
- Hey Yang, Where’s My Thousand Bucks? And Other True Stories of Staggering Depth. Akashic Books. February 3, 2026. ISBN 9781636142791.

== See also ==
- Basic income in the United States
- List of advocates of basic income
- Taiwanese Americans
