= Christine Todd Whitman =

American politician and author (born 1946)

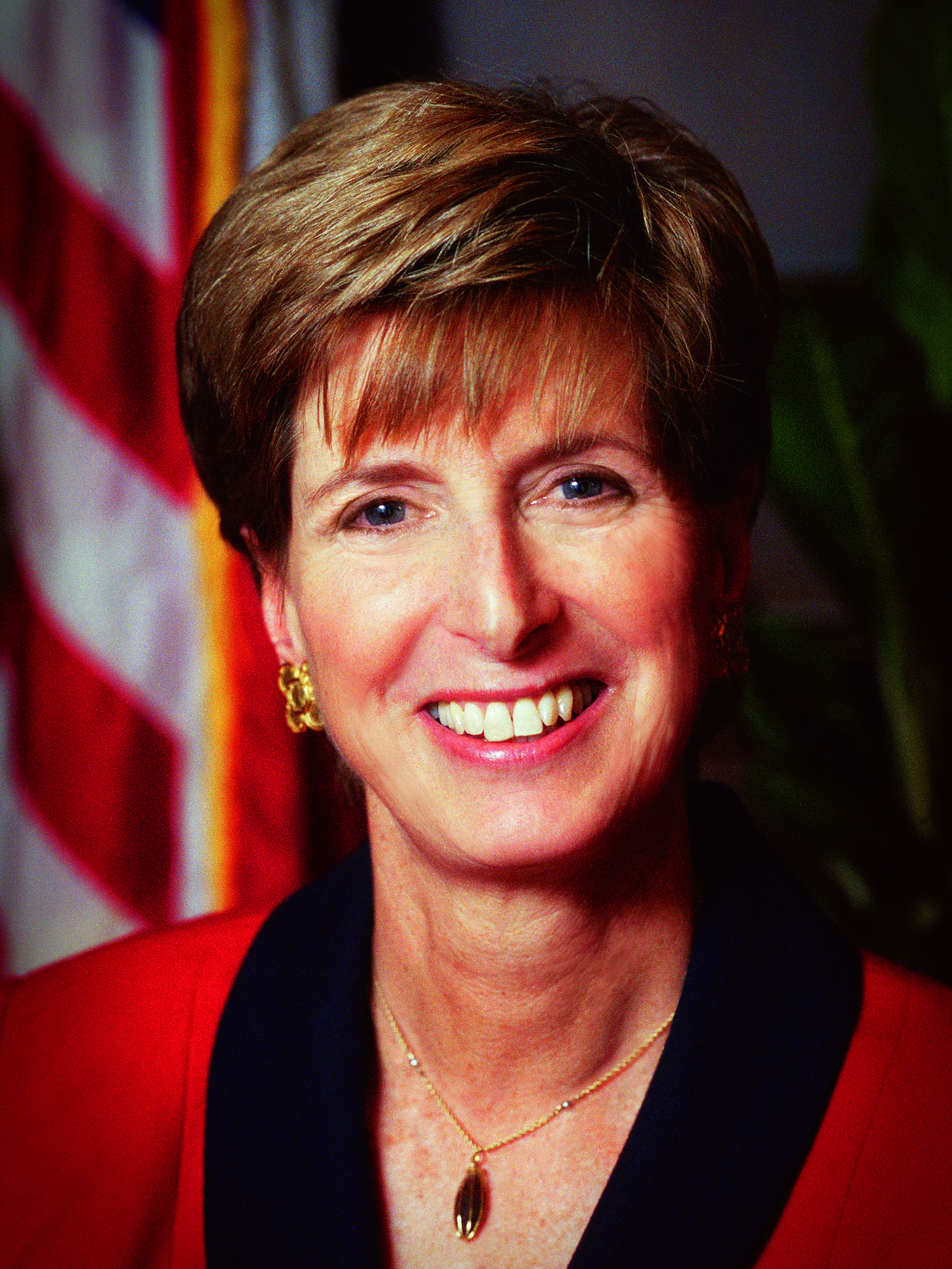
- Official portrait, 2001

Chair of the Forward Party
- Incumbent
- Assumed office July 28, 2022 Serving with Andrew Yang and Michael S. Willner
- Preceded by: Position established

9th Administrator of the Environmental Protection Agency
- In office January 31, 2001 – June 27, 2003
- President: George W. Bush
- Preceded by: Carol Browner
- Succeeded by: Mike Leavitt

50th Governor of New Jersey
- In office January 18, 1994 – January 31, 2001
- Preceded by: James Florio
- Succeeded by: Donald DiFrancesco

President of the New Jersey Board of Public Utilities
- In office February 10, 1988 – January 16, 1990
- Preceded by: Barbara A. Curran
- Succeeded by: Scott Weiner

Member of the Somerset County Board of Chosen Freeholders
- In office January 1, 1983 – January 29, 1988
- Preceded by: Doris Dealaman
- Succeeded by: Kip Bateman

Personal details
- Born: Christine Temple Todd; September 26, 1946 (age 80) New York City, U.S.
- Party: Forward (2022–present)
- Other political affiliations: Republican (before 2022)
- Spouse: John Whitman (m. 1974; died 2015)
- Children: Kate
- Relatives: Webster B. Todd (father)
- Education: Wheaton College (BA)

Christine Temple Whitman (née Todd; born September 26, 1946) is an American politician and author currently serving as National Co-chair of the Forward Party since 2022. She previously served as the 50th governor of New Jersey from 1994 to 2001. She was New Jersey's first female governor. (Note: Governor Mikie Sherrill became the second upon her January 20, 2026, inauguration.)

Born in New York City to a Republican political family, Whitman graduated from Wheaton College in 1968 and began her political career in the Nixon administration's Office of Economic Opportunity. After coming within three percentage points of unseating U.S. Senator Bill Bradley in 1990, she ran for governor of New Jersey, defeating Democratic incumbent Jim Florio. A self-described Rockefeller Republican, Whitman defeated Democrat Jim McGreevey to win re-election in 1997. She remained governor until stepping down in 2001 to become Administrator of the Environmental Protection Agency, where she served until 2003. During her tenure at the EPA, Whitman was noted for having assured the public that the air in lower Manhattan was safe to breathe following the terrorist attacks of September 11, 2001; she apologized in 2016 for having made this statement.

In 2022, Whitman joined former Democratic presidential candidate Andrew Yang to form the Forward Party, a centrist third party.

== Early life, family, and education ==
Christine Todd Whitman was born Christine Temple Todd in New York City on September 26, 1946. Her mother was Eleanor Prentice Todd (née Schley) and her father businessman Webster B. Todd. Both the Todds and the Schleys were wealthy and prominent New Jersey political families. The Schleys were among the first New Yorkers to move to the area that later became Far Hills, New Jersey, which became a popular suburb for wealthy, moderate Republicans. Webster B. Todd amassed a fortune as a building contractor on projects including Rockefeller Center and Radio City Music Hall. He used his wealth to donate to Republican politicians, becoming an advisor to Dwight D. Eisenhower and chairing the New Jersey Republican State Committee twice. Eleanor Prentice Todd served as a Republican national committeewoman, led the New Jersey Federation of Republican Women, and served as vice chair of the Republican National Committee. Eleanor Prentice Todd's political activity caused a newspaper to speculate that she could be a viable candidate for governor, although she never chose to run for office.

Christine Todd grew up on her family's farm, Pontefract, in Oldwick, New Jersey. She had three older siblings, including brothers Webster and Danny. At the age of nine, she attended the 1956 Republican National Convention and met President Eisenhower. As a child, Todd attended Far Hills Country Day School before being sent to boarding school at Foxcroft in Virginia. Todd disliked being so far away from home and after a year, she transferred to the Chapin School in Manhattan, allowing her to return home on the weekends.

After graduating from Wheaton College in 1968 with a Bachelor of Arts degree in government, Todd worked for Nelson Rockefeller's presidential campaign.

== Early career ==
Christine Todd married John Whitman in 1974. Christine Todd Whitman worked for the Office of Economic Opportunity and the Republican National Committee.

Whitman served on the board of trustees of Somerset County College (later renamed Raritan Valley Community College). Elected to two terms on the Somerset County Board of Chosen Freeholders, she served for five-and-one-half years beginning in 1983. From 1988 to 1990, during the tenure of Gov. Thomas Kean, she served as president of the New Jersey Board of Public Utilities.

In 1990, Whitman ran for the U.S. Senate against Democratic incumbent Bill Bradley, losing a close election. She was considered an underdog against the popular Bradley, but performed better than expected despite being outspent 12-to-one. Her performance endeared her to the party base and made her the leading public advocate of the anti-tax cause.

Whitman continued to build her profile by founding a political action committee, the Committee for an Affordable New Jersey, through which she campaigned for Republican candidates in the 1991 midterm elections. Whitman took on a full campaign speaking schedule through October 1992.

In 1993, Whitman helped to found the Committee for Responsible Government, an advocacy group espousing moderate positions in the Republican Party. In 1997, the group renamed itself the Republican Leadership Council.

== Governor of New Jersey ==
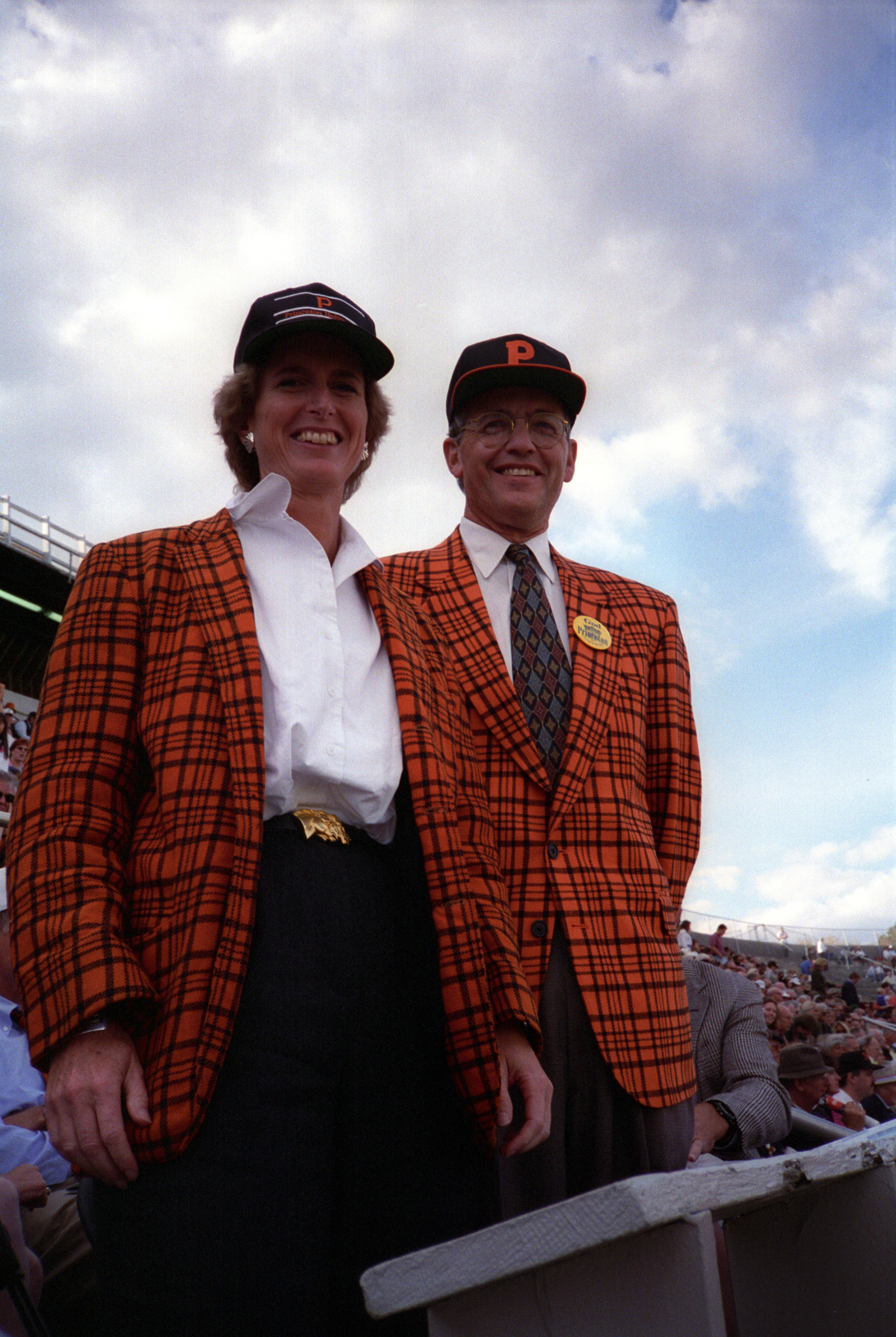
Whitman with Princeton President Harold Tafler Shapiro in October 1994

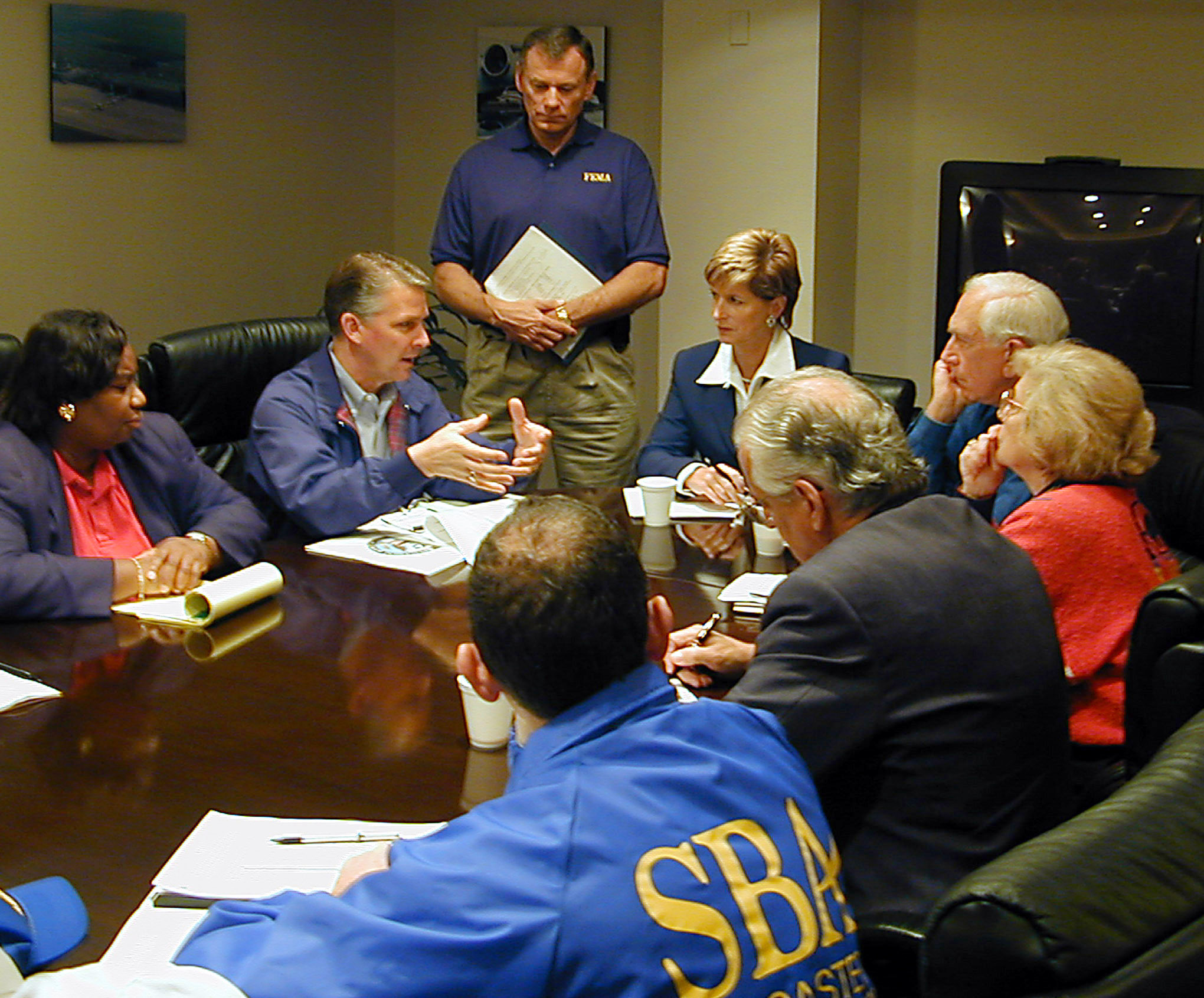
FEMA Director James Lee Witt meets with Governor Whitman and other New Jersey officials to discuss the response to Hurricane Floyd, September 21, 1999.

=== Elections ===
==== 1993 ====
After winning a Republican primary, Whitman ran against incumbent James Florio for governor of New Jersey in the 1993 general election. Whitman won the election by a plurality, defeating Florio by one percentage point to become the first female governor in New Jersey history. Until 2026, when Mikie Sherrill was sworn in, Whitman remained the only woman to have served as governor of New Jersey.

Charges of suppression of minority votes were raised during Whitman's 1993 campaign. Two days after the election, Ed Rollins, Whitman's campaign manager, bragged about having spent $500,000 to suppress the black vote. Whitman denied Rollins's claim and demanded an apology and a retraction. An investigation into Rollins's claim found no wrongdoing.

==== 1997 ====
Whitman was re-elected in 1997, narrowly defeating Democrat Jim McGreevey, the mayor of Woodbridge Township. Whitman again prevailed by a one-point margin and received a plurality of the votes. Murray Sabrin, a college professor who ran as a Libertarian candidate, finished third with five percent of the vote.

=== Tenure ===
During her tenure, Whitman was described as a Rockefeller Republican, as a liberal Republican, and as a moderate Republican. In 1995, the Washington Post called Whitman "an East Coast blue blood, a woman who grew up in the horse country of New Jersey and attended some of the nation's most exclusive private schools". The Post added, "At a time when the party's base has moved to the South, the West, the working class and the religious right, Whitman is a throwback with roots in the patrician Republican politics of three and four decades ago". Whitman "freely calls herself a pro-choice, Rockefeller Republican".

Whitman pledged during the 1993 campaign that she would lower state taxes by 10% a year for three years. Once in office, she kept the campaign promise, and lowered income taxes. The decline in the tax burden made it likely that the issue of tax revenue shortfall would be addressed later. Jim Saxton, in a report to the federal congress, argued that New Jersey's income tax cuts improved "the well-being of the New Jersey family", and would not lead to an increase in property taxes.

In 1995, Whitman was criticized for saying that young African-American males sometimes played a game known as jewels in the crown, which she claimed had as its intent having as many children as possible out of wedlock. Whitman subsequently apologized and voiced her opposition to attempts by Congressional Republicans to bar unwed teenage mothers from receiving welfare payments.

Also in 1995, the Republican Party selected Whitman to deliver the party's State of the Union response. She became the first woman to deliver a State of the Union response by herself; her speech was also the first State of the Union response given to a live audience.

In 1996, Whitman rejected a recommendation from the Governor's Council on AIDS to spend tax money on a needle exchange to reduce incidence of HIV infections.

In 1997, Whitman repealed the one percentage-point increase to the state sales tax that her predecessor Governor Florio had imposed, reducing the rate from 7% to 6%, instituted education reforms, and removed excise taxes on professional wrestling, which led the World Wrestling Federation to resume events in New Jersey. As a result, she was made honorary WWF Champion and awarded a replica belt by Gorilla Monsoon at that year's SummerSlam pay-per-view.

In 1999, Whitman vetoed a ban on partial birth abortion. Her veto was overridden, but the statute was subsequently declared unconstitutional by the judiciary.

In 1999, Whitman fired Colonel Carl A. Williams, head of the New Jersey State Police, after he was quoted as saying that cocaine and marijuana traffickers were often members of minority groups, while the methamphetamine trade was controlled primarily by white biker gangs.

When Democratic Senator Frank Lautenberg announced that he would not seek re-election in 2000, Whitman considered running for U.S. Senate, but ultimately decided against it.

Whitman resigned from office on January 31, 2001, to become administrator of the United States Environmental Protection Agency.

=== Cabinet and administration ===
The Whitman Cabinet
Office	Name	Term
Governor	Christine Todd Whitman	January 18, 1994 – January 31, 2001
Adjutant General	Major General Vito Morgano	April 9, 1990 – April 4, 1994
Major General Paul Glazar	April 4, 1994 – January 15, 2002
Secretary of Agriculture	Arthur R. Brown Jr.	July 1, 1982 – January 15, 2002
Attorney General	Deborah Poritz	January 18, 1994 – July 10, 1996
Peter Verniero	July 10, 1996 – May 15, 1999
Paul Zoubek	May 15, 1999 – June 3, 1999 (acting)
John Farmer Jr.	June 3, 1999 – January 15, 2002
Commissioner of Banking and Insurance	Elizabeth Randall	March 10, 1994 – August 24, 1998
Jaynee LaVecchia	August 24, 1998 – January 18, 2000
Karen Suter	January 18, 2000 – October 3, 2001
Commissioner of Commerce	Gualberto Medina	January 31, 1994 – August 28, 1998
Commissioner of Community Affairs	Harriet E. Derman	February 7, 1994 – May 1, 1996
Jane Kenny	May 1, 1996 – November 18, 2001
Commissioner of Corrections	William H. Fauver	January 18, 1978 – December 31, 1997
Gary Hilton	January 1, 1998 – March 2, 1998 (acting)
John Terhune	March 3, 1998 – January 1, 2001
Commissioner of Education	Leo Klagholz	February 23, 1994 – April 4, 1999
David C. Hespe	April 5, 1999 – February 26, 2001
Commissioner of Environmental Protection	Robert C. Shinn Jr.	February 7, 1994 – January 15, 2002
Commissioner of Health and Senior Services	Len Fishman	January 23, 1994 – March 1999
Christine Grant	June 21, 1999 – August 10, 2001
Commissioner of Human Services	William Waldman	December 1, 1992 – June 30, 1998
Michele (Kent) Guhl	July 1, 1998 – February 1, 2001
Commissioner of Insurance	Andrew Karpinski	July 6, 1994 – October 12, 1995
Elizabeth Randall	October 13, 1995 – June 27, 1996
Commissioner of Labor and Workforce; Development	Peter Calderone	January 18, 1994 – January 1997
Melvin Gelade	January 27, 1997 – June 2000
Mark Boyd	June 26, 2000 – January 15, 2002
Personnel Commissioner	Linda Anselmini	March 10, 1994 – January 20, 1998
Janice Mitchell Mintz	February 4, 1998 – January 15, 2002
Secretary of State	Lonna Hooks	January 18, 1994 – June 30, 1998
Carol Cronheim	July 1, 1998 – January 11, 1999 (acting)
DeForest Soaries	January 12, 1999 – January 15, 2002
Commissioner of Transportation	Frank Wilson	April 6, 1994 – December 31, 1996
John Haley, Jr.	January 6, 1997 – December 7, 1998
James Weinstein	December 7, 1998 – January 15, 2002
State Treasurer	Brian Clymer	January 24, 1994 – June 30, 1997
James DiEleuterio	July 1, 1997 – August 13, 1999
Roland Machold	August 30, 1999 – February 1, 2001

== Vice presidential speculation ==
Whitman was mentioned as a potential Republican vice presidential candidate in 1996.

According to The New York Times, Whitman "seemed to be on a short list of vice presidential candidates in 2000, right up until July 8, 2000 – days before the opening of the Republican National Convention in Philadelphia – when a four-year-old photograph surfaced showing an oddly smiling Governor Whitman, surrounded by law enforcement agents, frisking a black drug suspect on a street in Camden". In 1996, Whitman had joined a New Jersey State Police patrol in Camden, New Jersey. During the patrol, the officers stopped a 16-year-old African American male named Sherron Rolax and frisked him. The police did not find any contraband on Rolax's person, but Whitman frisked the youth as well. A state trooper photographed the act. In 2000, the image of the smiling governor frisking Rolax was published in newspapers statewide, drawing criticism from civil rights leaders who saw the incident as a violation of Rolax's civil rights and an endorsement of racial profiling by Whitman (especially since Rolax was not arrested or charged). Whitman later told the press that she regretted the incident, and pointed to her efforts in 1999 to oppose the New Jersey State Police force's racial profiling practices.

Ultimately, then-Republican presidential nominee George W. Bush selected Dick Cheney as his running mate in the 2000 presidential election.

== EPA Administrator ==
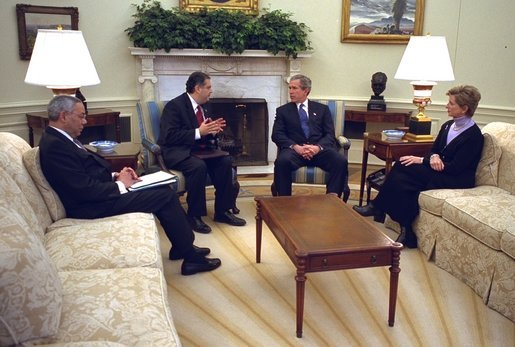
Whitman in a meeting with President George W. Bush, Colin Powell, and Spencer Abraham in February 2003

Whitman was appointed by President George W. Bush as Administrator of the United States Environmental Protection Agency, taking office on January 31, 2001.

In the final weeks of the Clinton administration in January 2001, the administration ratified a new drinking water standard of 0.01 mg/L (10 parts per billion, or ppb) of arsenic, to take effect in January 2006. The old drinking water standard of 0.05 mg/L (equal to 50 ppb) arsenic had been in effect since 1942, and the EPA, since the late 1980s, had weighed the pros and cons of lowering the maximum contaminant level (MCL) of arsenic. The incoming Bush administration suspended the midnight regulation, but after months of research, the EPA approved the new 10 ppb arsenic standard to take effect in January 2006 as initially planned.

In 2001, the EPA produced a report detailing the expected effects of global warming in each state in the country. President Bush dismissed the report as the work of "the bureaucracy."

=== Post 9/11 air quality claims controversy ===
After the September 11 attacks in New York City, she appeared there twice to inform New Yorkers that the toxins released by the attacks posed no threat to their health. On September 18, the EPA released a report in which Whitman said, "Given the scope of the tragedy from last week, I am glad to reassure the people of New York and Washington, D.C. that their air is safe to breathe and their water is safe to drink." She also said, "The concentrations are such that they don't pose a health hazard...We're going to make sure everybody is safe."

However, a 2003 report by the EPA's Inspector General determined that the assurance was misleading, because the EPA "did not have sufficient data and analyses" to justify it. A July 2003 report from the EPA Office of Solid Waste and Emergency Response provided extensive documentation supporting many of the inspector general's conclusions. The report further found that the White House had "convinced EPA to add reassuring statements and delete cautionary ones" by having the National Security Council control EPA communications after the September 11 attacks. On June 27, 2003, after having several public conflicts with the Bush administration, Whitman resigned.

In December 2006, legal proceedings began on the responsibility of government officials in the aftermath of the September 11, 2001 attacks. Whitman was among the defendants. The plaintiffs alleged that Whitman was at fault for saying that the downtown New York air was safe in the aftermath of the attacks.

On April 20, 2007, a three-judge panel of the 2nd U.S. Circuit Court of Appeals ruled that Whitman and other EPA officials could not be held liable for saying that the air was safe to breathe. The panel "reasoned that the government's interest in returning New York to normalcy following the attacks should protect it from lawsuits alleging that the government made false statements about air quality."

In an interview in 2007, Whitman stated that Vice President Dick Cheney's insistence on easing air pollution controls, not the personal reasons she cited at the time, led to her resignation. At the time, Cheney pushed the EPA to institute a new rule allowing power plants to make major alterations without installing costly new pollution controls. Whitman stepped down in protest against such demand by the White House, she said. She decided that because she did not agree with the rule, she would not be able to defend it if it were to be challenged in a legal action. The federal court eventually overturned the rule on the ground that it violated the Clean Air Act.

In 2016, Whitman apologized for the first time for her declaration a week after 9/11 that the air in lower Manhattan was safe to breathe.

== Post-government career ==
External audio
- Christine Todd Whitman: Battle for the GOP Core, Fresh Air, January 27, 2005

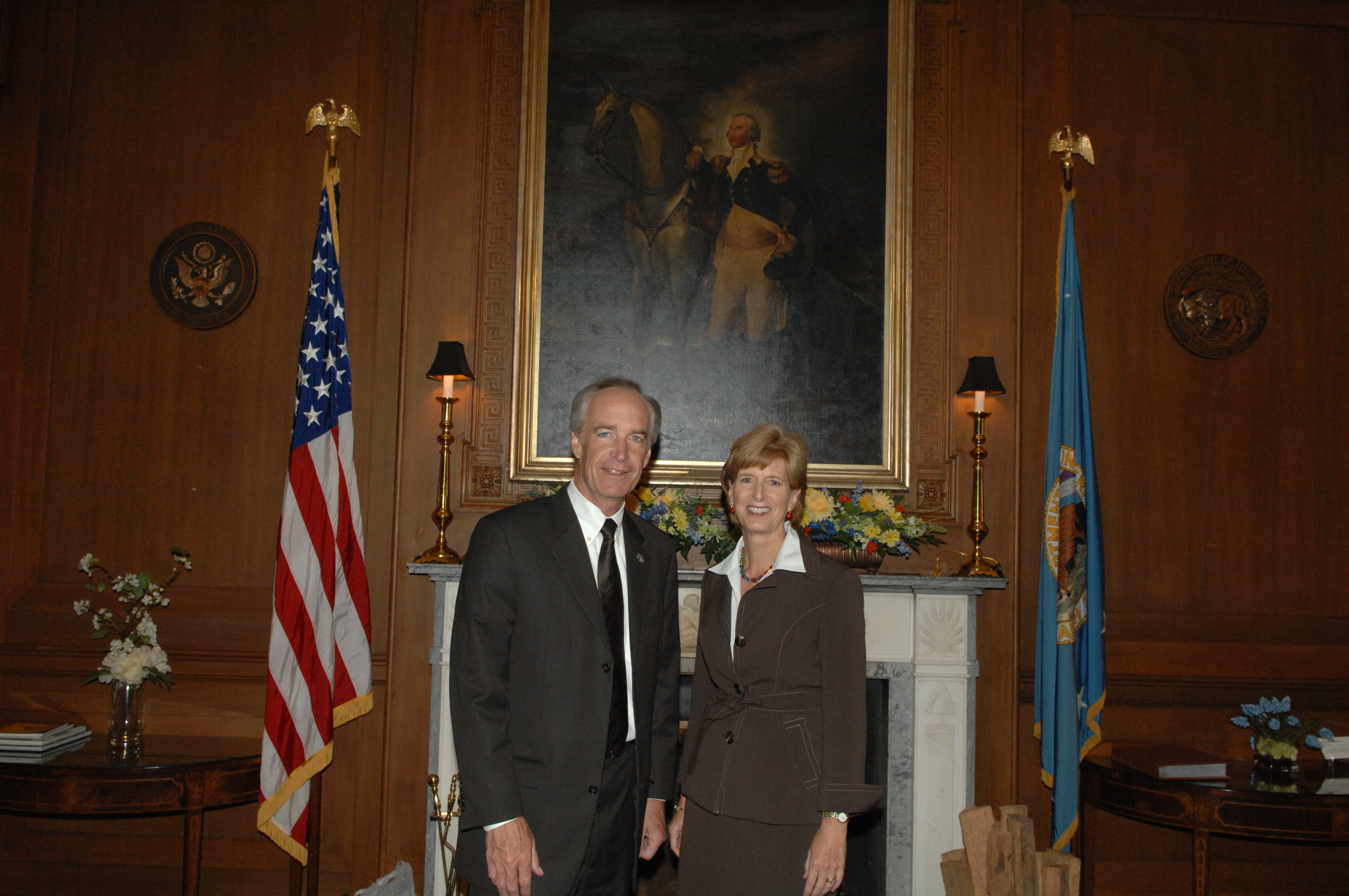
Whitman with Dirk Kempthorne in May 2008

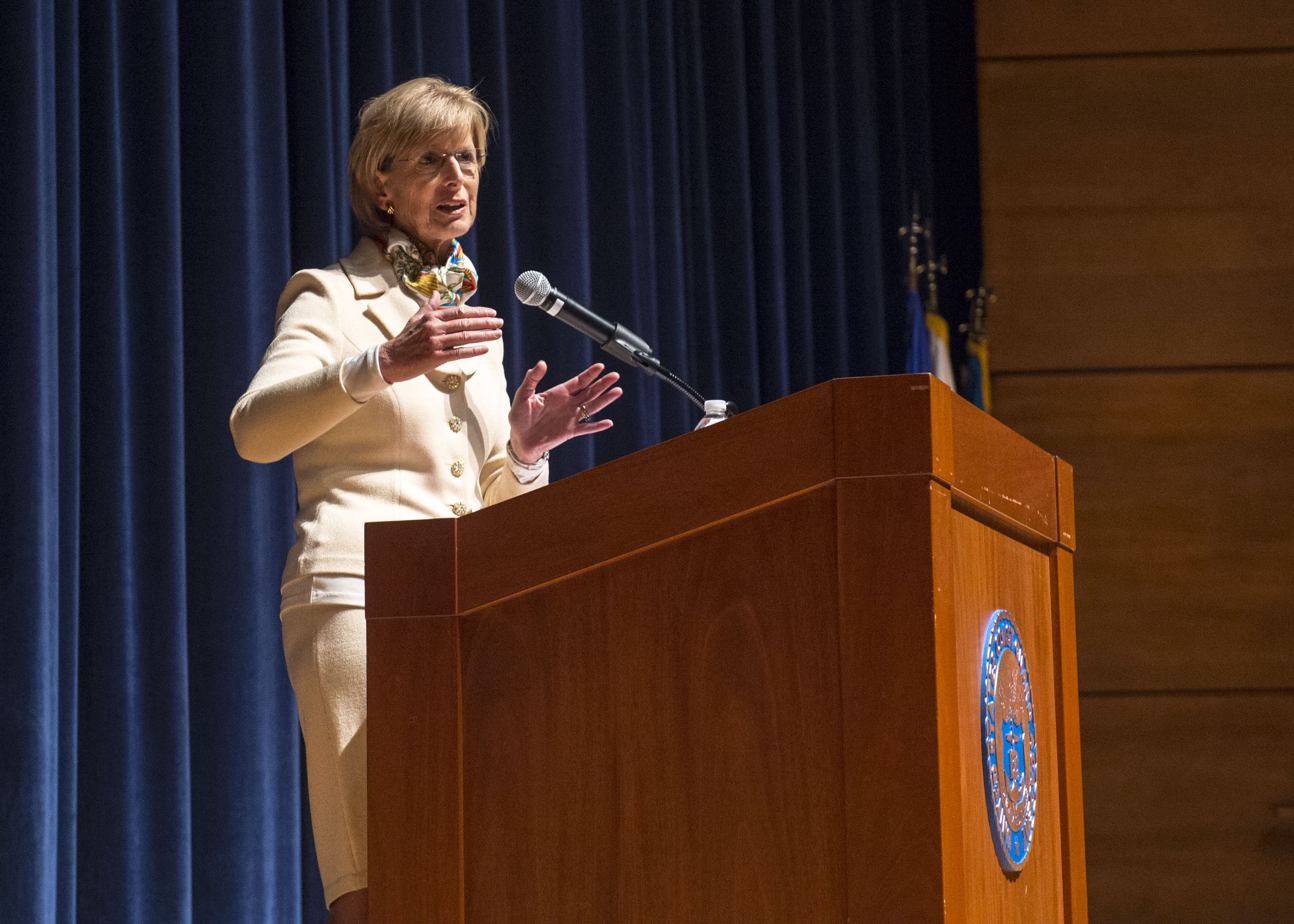
Whitman speaks to cadets during the Hedrick Fellow event at the Coast Guard Academy in March 2017

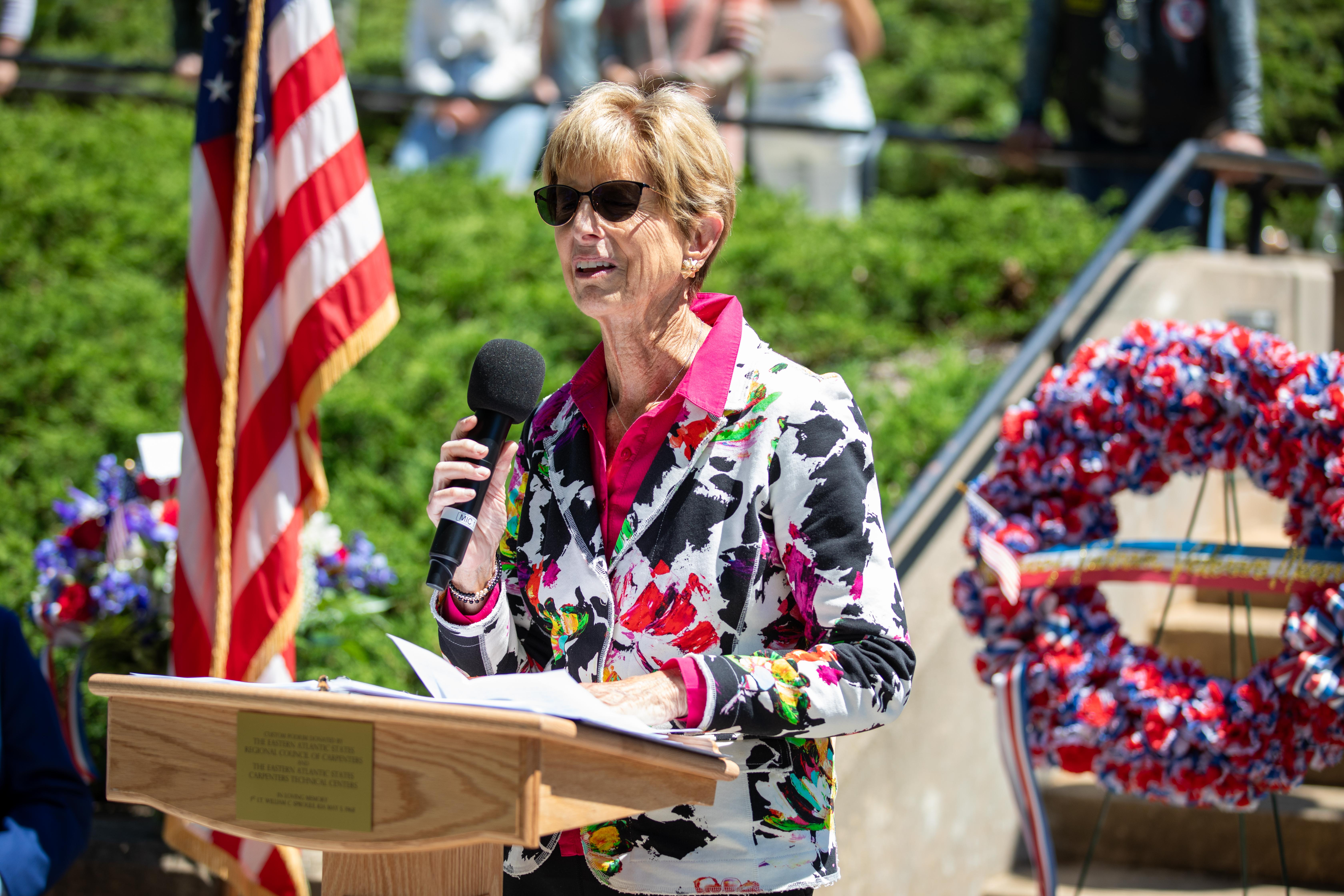
Whitman during a memorial day ceremony at the New Jersey Vietnam Veterans' Memorial in May 2025

=== Political activism ===
In early 2005, Whitman released a book entitled It's My Party, Too: Taking Back the Republican Party... And Bringing the Country Together Again in which she criticized the policies of the George W. Bush administration and its electoral strategy:

The defining feature of the conservative viewpoint is a faith in the ability, and a respect for the right, of individuals to make their own decisions – economic, social, and spiritual – about their lives. The true conservative understands that government's track record in respecting individual rights is poor when it dictates individual choices.

The last chapter of that book, entitled "A Time for Radical Moderates", speaks to radical centrists across the political spectrum. The same year as her book was released, Whitman formed a political action committee called It's My Party Too (IMP-PAC), to assist electoral campaigns of moderate Republicans at all levels of government. After the 2006 midterm elections, IMP-PAC was merged into RLC-PAC, the Republican Leadership Council's PAC.

Whitman "is co-founder and president of The Whitman Strategy Group, a consulting firm specializing in government relations, and environmental and energy issues".

In 2011, Whitman was named to the board of Americans Elect.

In February 2013, Whitman supported legal recognition of same-sex marriage in an amicus brief to the U.S. Supreme Court.

As of 2015, Whitman is a member of the ReFormers Caucus of Issue One. The group, which included 100 other former elected officials advocated for campaign finance reform.

In 2016, Whitman was named the co-chair of the Joint Ocean Commission Initiative.

On February 26, 2016, she endorsed John Kasich in his bid seeking the GOP nomination for presidential candidate. She said that Donald Trump was using "fascist" tactics in his campaign and after Chris Christie's endorsement of Trump said that, in the case of a Trump nomination by the GOP, she would vote for Hillary Clinton. In 2018, Whitman wrote an op-ed calling Trump unfit for office and urging other Republicans to pressure him to step down.

In February 2020, Whitman endorsed former Massachusetts Governor Bill Weld for president in the Republican primaries, in which he was challenging incumbent president Donald Trump. Whitman spoke at the 2020 Democratic National Convention, endorsing Democratic nominee Joe Biden over Republican nominee Donald Trump in the general election.

Whitman co-founded the States United Democracy Center in 2021. and, as of 2022, serves as its co-chair. In her States United capacity, she was among the former state officials who submitted testimony to the U.S. House of Representatives Select Committee to Investigate the January 6 Attack on the United States Capitol, arguing that the attack was part of "a sustained and coordinated effort by the former president and his anti-democracy allies to suppress voting rights, delegitimize free and fair elections, and subvert the will of the voters by overturning election results deemed undesirable to their movement." In July 2022, Whitman was among three former Republican governors who submitted a friend-of-the-court brief to the U.S. Supreme Court, urging the court to uphold provisions of the federal Voting Rights Acts of 1965 that protect minority voters from having their voting power diluted.

In 2022, Whitman joined former Democratic presidential candidate Andrew Yang to create the Forward Party, a centrist third party.

Whitman was a senior fellow at the Kettering Foundation, an American non-partisan research foundation from 2024-2025.

Whitman endorsed Democratic presidential nominee Kamala Harris in 2024. In the 2025 New Jersey gubernatorial election, she endorsed Democratic nominee Mikie Sherrill over Republican nominee Jack Ciattarelli.

=== Corporate activity ===
As of 2008, Whitman served on the board of directors of Texas Instruments and United Technologies. Whitman is also co-chair of the CASEnergy Coalition, and in 2007, voiced support for a stronger future role of nuclear power in the United States. Whitman joined the board of the American Security Project in April 2010; by 2015, she served as chairperson of its board of directors.

Former Governor and EPA Administrator Whitman was an active advocate of nuclear energy, and remains so to this day, although her focus has changed. In 2006, she became a co-chair of the Clean and Safe Energy Coalition, which is now defunct. In that role, she spoke alongside Patrick Moore, the co-founder of Greenpeace. They told many news outlets that nuclear was clean, safe and carbon-free. Her emphasis is now on promoting small modular nuclear reactors and preventing the closure of existing nuclear plants. That initiative was funded by the Nuclear Energy Institute, which shifted to the Nuclear Matters Coalition. It talks about the economic and environmental benefits of the current fleet.

== Personal life ==
At a 1973 inaugural ball for Richard Nixon, Christine had her first date with John R. Whitman (1944–2015), an old friend she had met while a student at Chapin. The pair married the next year. Whitman was a businessman and an investment banker; he was also the grandson of early 20th-century Governor of New York Charles S. Whitman.

While governor, Whitman used Pontefract, the family farm on which she was raised, as her primary residence. Whitman had purchased the property in 1991 following the death of her mother.

John Whitman died on July 2, 2015, at age 71 following a head injury he sustained the previous month. With her late husband, Whitman has two children: daughter Kate and son Taylor. Kate Whitman has followed her mother into politics, including an unsuccessful run for the U.S. House of Representatives and having worked as a congressional aide. In 2007, Kate Whitman was named executive director of the Republican Leadership Council, her mother's organization which promotes moderate Republicanism. Whitman has seven grandchildren.

Whitman has been a resident of Tewksbury Township, New Jersey.

== Electoral history ==
United States Senate election in New Jersey, 1990
Party	Candidate	Votes	%	±%
Democratic	Bill Bradley (incumbent)	977,810	50.44	
Republican	Christine Todd Whitman	918,874	47.40	

New Jersey gubernatorial election 1993 – Republican primary
Party	Candidate	Votes	%	±%
Republican	Christine Todd Whitman	159,765	39.96	
Republican	W. Cary Edwards	131,587	32.91	
Republican	James Wallwork	96,034	24.02	

New Jersey gubernatorial election, 1993
Party	Candidate	Votes	%	±%
Republican	Christine Todd Whitman	1,236,124	49.33	
Democratic	Jim Florio (incumbent)	1,210,031	48.29	

New Jersey gubernatorial election, 1997
Party	Candidate	Votes	%	±%
Republican	Christine Todd Whitman (incumbent)	1,133,394	46.87	
Democratic	Jim McGreevey	1,107,968	45.82	
Libertarian	Murray Sabrin	114,172	4.72	

== See also ==
- Health effects arising from the September 11 attacks
- List of female governors in the United States
- United States Environmental Protection Agency September 11 attacks pollution controversy

== Notes ==
Party political offices
Preceded by Mary Mochary	Republican nominee for U.S. Senator from New Jersey (Class 2); 1990	Succeeded by Dick Zimmer
Preceded by Jim Courter	Republican nominee for Governor of New Jersey; 1993, 1997	Succeeded by Bret Schundler
Preceded by Bob Dole	Response to the State of the Union address 1995	Succeeded by Bob Dole
Political offices
Preceded by James Florio	Governor of New Jersey; 1994–2001	Succeeded by Donald DiFrancesco
Preceded by Carol Browner	Administrator of the Environmental Protection Agency; 2001–2003	Succeeded by Mike Leavitt
U.S. order of precedence (ceremonial)
Preceded by Thomas Kean as Former Governor	Order of precedence of the United States	Succeeded by Donald DiFrancesco as Former Governor
