= Forward Party (United States) =

American political party

- Abbreviation: FWD
- Chairperson: Kerry Healey
- CEO: Lindsey Williams Drath
- Founding Co-Chairs: Andrew Yang; Christine Todd Whitman; Michael S. Willner
- Founder: Andrew Yang
- Founded: October 5, 2021; 5 years ago
- Merger of: Forward Party (original PAC); Renew America Movement; Serve America Movement
- Headquarters: Washington, D.C., U.S.
- Youth wing: Young Forwardist
- Registered voters (July 2026): 6,068
- Ideology: Big tent; Populism (US); Reformism; Decentralization
- Political position: Center
- Colors: Purple
- Slogan: Moving Forward Together.; Not Left. Not Right. Forward.
- Senate: 0 / 100
- House of Representatives: 0 / 435
- State governors: 0 / 50
- State upper chambers (Note: Utah State Senator Emily Buss was elected in a special election to replace Forward politician Daniel Thatcher, who switched to the party from the Republican Party.): 1 / 1,972
- State lower chambers: 0 / 5,411
- Territorial governorships: 0 / 5
- Territorial upper chambers: 0 / 97
- Territorial lower chambers: 0 / 91
- Other elected officials: 6 (June 2026)

Website
- forwardparty.com

The Forward Party (shortened Forward or FWD) is a centrist political party in the United States. The party was founded by former Democratic 2020 presidential and 2021 New York City mayoral candidate Andrew Yang and former New Jersey Governor Christine Todd Whitman. It describes its goals as the reduction of partisan polarization and the implementing of electoral reforms. The party looked to achieve ballot access in all 50 states by 2025 and looks to achieve federal recognition by 2028.

Forward was officially formed as a political action committee (PAC) on October 5, 2021. The PAC intended to seek recognition from the Federal Election Commission as a political party to achieve its stated goal of providing an alternative to the two major U.S. political parties. It also stated that, for the time being, candidates affiliated with the organization will remain members of the two major American political parties and third parties, as well as independent candidates. On July 27, 2022, the Forward Party announced that it had merged with the Serve America Movement and the Renew America Movement to further its effort to form a new third party named Forward.

Ideologically, Forward is populist and reformist, and a representative of centrism in the United States. It considers itself to be the center within the American political spectrum, although the party has also been described as big tent or syncretic due to its unwillingness on holding any firm stances or positions, and its rejection of the left–right political spectrum. The party's American-style populism, particularly in its early platform, focused toward independent voters and those dissatisfied with the American two-party system, and advocated a universal basic income within humanistic capitalism. It continues to support electoral and democratic reform, including nonpartisan primaries, independent redistricting commissions, and ranked-choice voting.

== History ==
=== Founding and early history ===
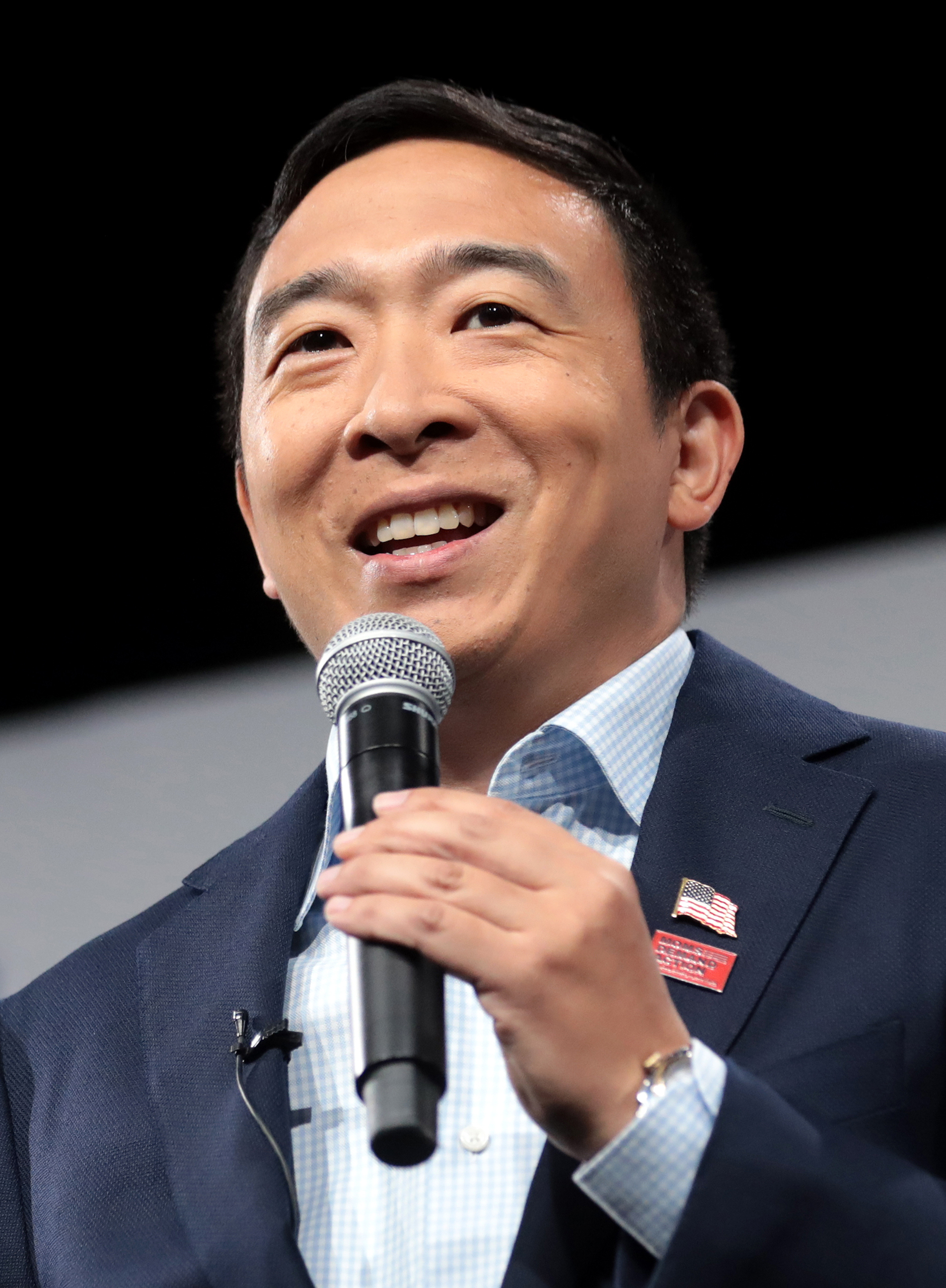
Andrew Yang, the party founder, in 2019

In his book Forward: Notes on the Future of Our Democracy (2021), Andrew Yang announced the creation of the party. Yang also criticized American political leaders, writing that "our leaders are rewarded based not on solving problems but on accruing resources and retaining office." Yang said that part of the reason why he wanted to start a third party instead of a caucus within the Democratic Party was that a majority of states with ballot initiatives are red states, and that efforts to institute electoral changes would be partisan and not system-wide. Yang stated that he would have liked to have implemented the Forward Party's platform within the Democratic Party; however, he felt that the implementation of ranked-choice voting and open primaries would be difficult to get while remaining a Democrat.

On October 5, 2021, Yang launched the Forward Party as a PAC, with the intention of creating a political party. The Forward Party stated that it would endorse candidates of both major parties in the 2022 midterm elections who support its policies. Yang stated that the Forward Party would not serve a spoiler because it would endorse any Democrats and Republicans who support the party's platform. The Forward Party website suggests that candidates affiliated with the Forward Party would likely run as a member of one of the two major parties. Yang stated that the Forward Party is not interested in running a candidate for U.S. president but is focused on trying to decrease partisan gridlock within Congress and state legislatures. The Forward Party stated it may hold its own primary process to nominate a candidate prior to the 2024 United States presidential election.

In November 2021, Yang discussed the Forward Party with Van Jones about "positive populism, finding common ground, and why Democrats often end up having to defend the status quo". In February 2022, the Forward Party chose Minnesota as the first state to launch an affiliate party. According to Yang, Minnesota was chosen because there are "open primaries, public resources for candidates [and the state has] an independent spirit". The Minnesota affiliate is being headed by John Denney, who ran for the sixth district in the 2014 United States House of Representatives elections in Minnesota as a member of the Independence Party of Minnesota. Denney attempted to get Richard Painter, who served as the chief White House ethics lawyer in the George W. Bush administration, to run as a member of the Forward Party in the 2022 Minnesota Attorney General election. Cory Hepola, a radio host, announced he was running as a member of the Forward Party in the 2022 Minnesota gubernatorial election. He later withdrew from the race.

=== Mergers and official party founding ===
Forward Party logo from 2022 to 2025

In July 2022, the Forward Party, Renew America Movement, and Serve America Movement announced that they would be merging in an attempt to form a new third party. The new party, named simply Forward, would be co-chaired by Andrew Yang and former New Jersey governor Christine Todd Whitman. Shortly after launching, former Pennsylvania Democratic U.S. Representative Joe Sestak and former Florida Republican U.S. Representative David Jolly both announced they would be joining the party. They also announced that the party would launch on September 24, 2022, with its first national convention in summer 2023.

The Forward Party's affiliate, the Griebel-Frank for CT Party, appeared in the 2022 Connecticut gubernatorial election. The Griebel-Frank for CT Party endorsed the incumbent governor Ned Lamont. Following the election, the party won 0.23% of the vote, failing to cross the 1% minimum to stay on the ballot for the 2026 governor's race without a petition drive.

On January 27, 2023, Forward and the Common Sense Party of California announced a coalition in California, with the goal of achieving 73,000 registered voters in order to become a qualified political party in the state.

On October 18, 2023, the South Carolina Independence Party announced that the party was merging with the Forward Party, making South Carolina the third state in which Forward is ballot-qualified after Florida and Utah. The Forward Party had no plans to run a candidate for president in 2024 and instead planned on working to elect state and local officials. The party stated they would "do anything we can to make sure that Donald Trump does not get near the White House".

On April 2, 2025, the United Utah Party announced plans to merge with the Forward Party of Utah, and during a joint convention on April 26, members of both parties voted in favor of the merger.

The Independence-Alliance Party of Minnesota and Forward Party of Minnesota merged in conventions on July 26, 2025. The new name is Forward Independence. There was some confusion, as the Independence-Alliance Party of Minnesota was affiliated with the Alliance Party on the national level. State Independence-Alliance Party officials said they would continue a "dual national affiliation" until the 2027 party convention by which time they hope both national branches will merge. In the end, they decided to have a "collaborative relationship" with the Alliance Party and encourage national merger talks.

On November 6, 2025, a partnership was announced with the Arizona Independent Party, which provides ballot access to Independents.

=== Pledge of the Party ===
The Forward Party focuses on a values-based platform rather than a traditional policy platform, encouraging candidates to propose innovative and data-driven solutions to local challenges. The Forward Party requires all candidates it endorses to sign a candidate pledge. The main points of the pledge states: "Democracy only works when people respect the established rules and the electoral system is set up to elevate the voice of the voter ... Candidates should work collaboratively to craft long-term solutions to their community's most pressing problems ... Public servants should be role models for the community."

=== Elected officials ===
In May 2023, Jordan Marlowe, the mayor of Newberry, Florida, announced that he was switching his party registration from Libertarian to Forward, becoming the party's first sitting executive. On June 21, 2023, two Democratic members of the Pennsylvania State Senate announced they were joining the Forward Party. Senators Anthony H. Williams and Lisa Boscola announced that, while they were retaining their Democratic Party affiliation and caucus membership, they were also affiliating with the Forward Party and would be labeled as "Forward Democrats" according to the Forward Party.

In August 2023, Philadelphia City Commissioner Seth Bluestein and Allegheny County District Attorney Stephen Zappala announced their affiliation as Forward Republicans. In November 2023, Stonington Town Selectwoman Danielle Chesebrough became a member of the Forward Party, and was reelected on an independent Forward Party ticket. She became the Forward Party's first elected official in Connecticut. In total, the Forward Party considered to have elected Forwardists Danielle Chesebrough of Connecticut as Stonington First Selectman, James Kole of Maryland as Laurel Councilman, Seth Bluestein of Pennsylvania as Philadelphia City Commissioner, Chris Woodward of Pennsylvania as Lower Heidelberg Twp Auditor, and Steve Zappala of Pennsylvania as Allegheny District Attorney.

In March 2025, Daniel Thatcher left the Republican Party and announced his affiliation with the Forward Party, bringing Forward Party representation to the Utah Senate. In December 2025, Thatcher retired and was replaced by Forward member Emily Buss in a special election that used approval voting.

=== Ballot access ===
In 2023, the Forward Party gained ballot access in Florida, South Carolina, and Utah. Five candidates ran for various offices throughout Utah in the 2024 United States elections. In June 2023, Christine Todd Whitman, one of the party's founding-co-chairs, said that the party's goal was to achieve ballot access in all 50 states by 2025. In early 2024, the party added Colorado and Virginia, where it qualifies to have its name printed on ballots if its candidates get on the ballot via petition. In Colorado, it qualified as a minor party following a petition campaign that collected approximately 17,000 signatures. In August 2024, Lindsey Williams Drath, the party's CEO, said that Forward hoped to achieve federal recognition by 2028. In May 2026, Forward qualified as a minor party in New Mexico.

=== Cross-party endorsements ===
During the 2024 election, the Forward Party endorsed Democrats, Republicans, and Independents, as well as other minor party candidates.

== Organization and membership ==
After its merger and official founding in July 2022, the party's positions included founding co-chairs Andrew Yang (2020 Democratic presidential candidate), Christine Todd Whitman (former Republican governor of New Jersey), and Michael S. Willner (businessman), as well as co-CEOs Matt Shinners (from July–September 2022 and then interim CEO from September 2022–February 2023, when he became the chief strategy and operating officer) and Miles Taylor (former Republican who served as Homeland Security official in the Trump administration). David Jolly, another former Republican who had joined the Serve America Movement, was also reported to take a leadership role.

Other individuals in party positions include chief executive officer Lindsey Williams Drath (former Republican National Convention member), chairperson Kerry Healey (former Republican and Lieutenant Governor of Massachusetts under Mitt Romney), national organizing director Will Conway (former Republican), and advisory board members like Joe Sestak (former Democratic U.S. Representative). Mindy Finn became vice president of advancement in 2026.

Forward had 1126 members in California and the Common Sense Party of California had 15,010 (as of October 20, 2025). It is unclear if they are still working together. Forward had 1043 members in Florida (as of July 21, 2025), 439 members in Colorado (as of December 31, 2025), and 3002 members in Utah (as of August 18, 2025). At the end of 2025, the party claimed 250,232 supporters. Abbreviated FWD, the party colors are purple, cyan, blue, red, navy blue, and white. Its slogans include "Moving Forward Together" and "Not Left. Not Right. Forward", the latter of which is almost exactly the same as the Unity Party.

== Political positions ==
=== Early positions ===
The party's original platform was based around what Andrew Yang called "positive populism". It included instituting 18-year term limits for members of Congress. It also sought to establish a new cabinet-level Department of Technology. The party supported civic juries and advocated for a "citizens' portal". The party supported data as a property right. The party called for an economy based on humanistic capitalism or what Yang called in 2020 "human-centered capitalism", the enactment of universal basic income, and support for alternative forms of measuring economic progress.

The party advocated for automatic tax filing. Forward's former platform supported the implementation of a universal health care system, and it encouraged states to adopt nonpartisan primaries and implement ranked-choice voting, a concept Yang draws from political theorist and businesswoman Katherine Gehl called Final Five Voting. It also proposed independent redistricting commissions and public finance reform in the form of democracy dollars. The party encourages people to maintain their membership in the Democratic and Republican parties as to not disenfranchise them by leaving them unable to vote in party primaries. As a consequence, Forward plans to endorse candidates from both major and third parties, as well as independents who advocate for the core values rather than field their own.

=== Positions after mergers ===
Upon merging with the Renew America Movement and Serve America Movement in July 2022, Forward was described as centrist. It eliminated its party platform and instead announced they would take an approach that seeks common ground among Americans. Two pillars of the new party's platform were to "reinvigorate a fair, flourishing economy" and to "give Americans more choices in elections, more confidence in a government that works, and more say in our future". Joel Searby, the former Renew America's political director and the then managing director of Forward, said that the party does not plan on taking positions on controversial issues, such as guns and abortion; instead they would leave those issues up to candidates and state and local chapters to decide. Searby also said: "We think that Americans want and need a party that speaks to the needs of their local communities and gives elected officials the flexibility to meet those needs, instead of a rigid, top-down platform that prescribes exactly what you have to believe about any given issue."

Forward takes a specific stance on electoral and democratic reform, and the party continues to support nonpartisan primaries, independent redistricting commissions, ranked-choice voting, STAR voting, and approval voting. After the Democratic loss in the 2024 United States presidential election, Andrew Yang took part in the "11 Democratic Thinkers on What the Party Needs Right Now" article in Politico. He wrote: "In many ways, these all boil down to one thing: The Democratic Party should act more democratically. But they will do none of these things. Instead, they will begin jockeying for position within the party to run in 2028. That is why more and more voters will look for options, like the Forward Party, or declare themselves independents as Trump returns to power. Institutions incapable of reform get replaced."

== Reception ==
The Forward Party has faced criticism from some Democrats, who believe the party could cause vote splitting and benefit Republicans in most jurisdictions, which still use first-past-the-post voting. Luke Savage of Jacobin criticized the conception of the party as "pseudo-populism that's ultimately more an effort at rebranding the status quo than overthrowing it". MSNBC opinion columnist Zeeshan Aleem called the Forward Party "an uninspiring mess lacking vision or purpose". Natalie Shure of The New Republic characterized the party as "vapid" and a "political stunt", asking "why bother going through the trouble of building a third party if its creation is the only thing it intends to accomplish?"

Andrew Gawthorpe writing in The Guardian stated that the Forward Party is "likely to collapse under the weight of its own contradictions" as a new third party would not address more fundamental political problems in the United States, a view that had been also echoed by Jamelle Bouie. Gawthorpe suggested that the Democratic Party is the only viable political party that could counter the stated "threat to U.S. democracy" posed by the Republican party. In contrast, New York Times opinion writer Kara Swisher praised Yang's book Forward: Notes on the Future of Our Democracy, which inspired the pre-July 2022 positions of the party. Swisher wrote: "Yang does not just give us a laundry list of intractable problems, but shows how we can find solutions if we think in new ways and summon the courage to do so."

== Election results ==
Year	State	Seat	Affiliate Party	Candidate	Votes	%	Place	Ref.
2026	New York	Mayor of New Paltz	Forward Party New York	Alexandria Wojcik	2,071	100%	Elected; 1st of 1	
2026	New York	Village Trustee of New Paltz	Forward Party New York	Jasmine Gisele Towers	973	100%	Elected; 1st of 1	
2026	Colorado	United States Senate	Colorado Forward Party	Bob Chew	70,049	2.63%	3rd of 6	
2026	Colorado	Secretary of State	Colorado Forward Party	Celeste Landry	17,513	0.67%	5th of 5	
2026	Colorado	House of Representatives District 4	Colorado Forward Party	Bill Hare	718	1.99%	3rd of 3	
2026	Minnesota	State Auditor	Forward Independence Party	Jay Reeves	78,987	2.84%	3rd of 3	
2026	Minnesota	Senate District 11	Forward Independence Party	Monique Doward	996	2.48%	3rd of 3	
2026	Pennsylvania	House District 143	Pennsylvania Forward Party	Chris Gambino	713	2.13%	3rd of 3	
2026	Utah	Senate District 1	Utah Forward	Julie Quinlan	3,112	8.46%	3rd of 3	
2026	Utah	Senate District 6	Utah Forward	Josh Smith	2,323	7.31%	3rd of 3	
2026	Utah	Senate District 9	Utah Forward	J. Lowry Snow	1,137	2.92%	3rd of 3	
2026	Utah	Senate District 11	Utah Forward	Emily Buss (incumbent)	15,607	49.19%	2nd of 2	
2026	Utah	Senate District 13	Utah Forward	Colin Smith	1,320	4.01%	3rd of 3	
2026	Utah	Senate District 20	Utah Forward	Annette Mcrae	14,221	38.85%	2nd of 2	
2026	Utah	Senate District 21	Utah Forward	Wayne Woodfield	5,646	14.77%	3rd of 3	
2026	Utah	House of Representatives District 6	Utah Forward	James Rich	4,453	31.29%	2nd of 2	
2026	Utah	House of Representatives District 8	Utah Forward	Libby Shelton	621	4.20%	3rd of 3	
2026	Utah	House of Representatives District 13	Utah Forward	Tony De Mille	834	7.05%	3rd of 3	
2026	Utah	House of Representatives District 23	Utah Forward	Cabot W. Nelson	529	2.55%	3rd of 3	
2026	Utah	House of Representatives District 28	Utah Forward	Wales Nematollahi	909	7.99%	3rd of 3	
2026	Utah	House of Representatives District 29	Utah Forward	Tynley Bean	667	4.95%	4th of 4	
2026	Utah	House of Representatives District 53	Utah Forward	John Boyd	4,159	30.22%	2nd of 3	
2026	Utah	House of Representatives District 63	Utah Forward	Julie Smith	1,406	9.10%	3rd of 3	
2026	Utah	House of Representatives District 70	Utah Forward	Zeno B. Parry	285	2.12%	3rd of 3	
2025	South Carolina	Mayor of Georgetown	South Carolina Forward Party	Jay Doyle	1,244	55.91%	Elected; 1st of 2	
2025	Virginia	House of Delegates District 11	Forward Party in Virginia	Brandon N. Givens	581	1.87%	3rd of 3	
2025	Virginia	House of Delegates District 72	Forward Party in Virginia	Kristin A. Farry	839	1.87%	3rd of 3	
2024	Utah	State Treasurer	Forward Party of Utah	Miles Pomeroy	76,212	5.38%	3rd of 3	
2024	Utah	State House District 15	Forward Party of Utah	Josh Smith	4,783	24.30%	2nd of 2	
2024	Utah	State School Board District 3	Forward Party of Utah	Laura Johnson	26,628	30.47%	2nd of 2	
2024	Colorado	Colorado's 5th congressional district	Colorado Forward Party	Christopher Sweat	1,627	0.45%	6th of 6	
2024	Colorado	State House District 36	Colorado Forward Party	Eric Mulder	8,532	28.46%	2nd of 2	

== State and territorial parties ==
=== Current affiliates ===
Party	State	Membership	Ballot Access
Colorado Forward Party	Colorado	451 (2026)	Yes
Florida Forward Party	Florida	2,265 (2026)	Yes
Forward Independence Party	Minnesota		Yes
New Mexico Forward Party	New Mexico		Yes
South Carolina Forward Party	South Carolina		Yes
Forward Party of Utah	Utah	3,026 (2026)	Yes

== See also ==
- List of Forward Party politicians who have held office in the United States

=== Similar parties in the United States ===
==== National ====
- Alliance Party
- Independence Party of America
- Liberal Party USA
- Reform Party of the United States of America
- Unity Party of America

==== State ====
- Colorado Center Party
- Common Sense Party of California
- Independent Party of Oregon
- Arizona Independent Party
