= Michael S. Willner =

American businessman (born 1952)

Chair of the Forward Party
- Incumbent
- Assumed office July 28, 2022 Serving with Christine Todd Whitman and Andrew Yang
- Preceded by: Position established

Personal details
- Born: 1952 (age 73–74)
- Party: Forward
- Education: Boston University (BA)
- Website: Official website

Michael S. Willner (born 1952) is an American businessman, lobbyist, and politician serving as National Co-chair of the Forward Party alongside Andrew Yang and Christine Todd Whitman.

== Career ==
Willner spent much of his career in the cable television industry, where he served as vice-chairman and CEO of Penthera. He also co-founded Insight Communications in 1985, where he served as CEO and vice chairman of the board until February 2012, when the company was sold to Time Warner Cable.
