= Renew America Movement =

US political organization

The Renew America Movement (RAM) was an American political group founded in 2021 by former staffers from Republican Party administrations, with the intention of working to reduce political polarization in the United States. In 2022, it merged with the Serve America Movement and the Forward Party, to form a political party under the Forward Party name that was launched on September 24, 2022.

== History ==
The Renew America Movement founding was led by former Department of Homeland Security official Miles Taylor, who served under former President Donald Trump. Their stated goals were to unite Democrats, Republicans, and independent voters "...who have the courage to stand up against political extremists across the country", for a reduction of political polarization in the United States.

Founding members of the group also included Republicans George Conway, Anthony Scaramucci, 2016 presidential candidate Evan McMullin, former Governor of Massachusetts William Weld, former Governor of Pennsylvania and former head of the Department of Homeland Security Tom Ridge, former Governor of New Jersey Christine Todd Whitman. Democratic Party founding members include US House of Representatives members Elissa Slotkin of Michigan and Abigail Spanberger of Virginia, and Senator Mark Kelly of Arizona.

In October 2021, the group released a list of 13 Republican members of Congress that they planned to run against in the 2022 midterm elections. The Congress members on the list had all voted to overturn the 2020 presidential election results on January 6, and had also voted against impeaching former President Trump following the January 6 United States Capitol attack. These included Utah Representative Burgess Owens and House Minority Leader Kevin McCarthy, Rep. Andy Biggs of Arizona, Rep. Dan Bishop of North Carolina, Rep. Lauren Boebert of Colorado, Rep. Madison Cawthorn of North Carolina, Rep. Matt Gaetz of Florida, Rep. Bob Good of Virginia, Rep. Paul Gosar of Arizona, Rep. Jim Jordan of Ohio, Rep. Scott Perry of Pennsylvania, Rep. Steve Scalise of Louisiana, and Rep. Marjorie Taylor Greene of Georgia.

In February 2022, the group publicly condemned the Republican National Committee's decision to censure Republican US Representatives Liz Cheney and Adam Kinzinger for their participation in the United States House Select Committee on the January 6 Attack.

In July 2022, RAM announced that they were merging with the Serve America Movement and the Forward Party, to form a political party under the Forward Party name, which was launched on September 24, 2022, at a convention in Houston, Texas.
