= Universal basic income in the United States =

Universal basic income and negative income tax, which is a related system, has been debated in the United States since the 1960s, and to a smaller extent also before that. During the 1960s and 1970s a number of experiments with negative income tax were conducted in United States and Canada. In the 1970s another and somewhat related welfare system was introduced instead, the Earned Income Tax Credit. The next big development in the history of basic income in the United States came in 1982, when the Alaska Permanent Fund was established. It has delivered partial basic income, financed from the state's oil and gas revenues, ever since.

== Older history (from Paine and Spence to 1900) ==
Arguably the first to propose a system with great similarities to a national basic income in the United States was Thomas Paine, in Agrarian Justice, 1796/1797. His idea was that a few "basic incomes" to young people, in their 20s, financed by tax on heritage, was highly needed and also a matter of justice. Shortly after that, in 1797, Thomas Spence outlined a complete basic income proposal.

== 1900–1960 ==
In the first half of the 20th century various people in the United States advocated some kind of basic income. There were for example the Louisiana Governor Huey Long who called it "Share Our Wealth" and also some followers of Henry George.

== 1960s and 1970s ==
In the 1960s and the 1970s the debate around, and support for, basic income and the related system negative income tax, rose substantially. This debate and interest was highly linked to general debate on poverty and how to deal with it. In 1968, James Tobin, Paul Samuelson, John Kenneth Galbraith and another 1,200 economists signed a document calling for the US Congress to introduce in that year a system of income guarantees and supplements. Milton Friedman endorsed the negative income tax in 1962 and again in 1980, and he connected his support for the negative income tax to support for basic income in an interview with Eduardo Suplicy in 2000.

The Reverend Martin Luther King, a famous civil rights activist and politician, also gave his support for the idea in his book Where Do We Go From Here: Chaos or Community?, published in 1967. In 1969, US President Richard Nixon proposed a "Family Assistance Program" which resembled guaranteed income, in that benefits did not rapidly taper with additional earnings by the beneficiaries. Nixon's proposal only applied to families, but extended previous welfare by benefiting more than those without a 'father'. Other advocates from the 1960s and 1970s include US Senator George McGovern who called for a 'demogrant' that was similar to a basic income, although a plank calling for a guaranteed income of $6,500 was defeated at the 1972 Democratic National Convention.

From 1968 to 1982, the US and Canadian governments conducted a total of five negative income tax experiments. They were the first major social science experiments in the world. The first experiment was the New Jersey Income Maintenance Experiment, proposed by MIT Economics graduate student Heather Ross in 1967 in a proposal to the U.S. Office of Economic Opportunity. The four experiments were:

1. The New Jersey Income Maintenance Experiment: Trenton, Passaic, Paterson, and Jersey City, New Jersey with Scranton, Pennsylvania added to increase the number of white families, 1968–1972 (1357 families)
2. The Rural Income Maintenance Experiment: Rural areas in Iowa and North Carolina, 1969–1973 (809 families)
3. Gary, Indiana, 1971–1974 (1800 families)
4. Seattle (SIME) and Denver (DIME), 1971–1982 (4800 families)
5. Manitoba, Canada ("Mincome"), 1974–1979

In general they found that workers would decrease labor supply (employment) by two to four weeks per year because of the guarantee of income equal to the poverty threshold.

== The 1980s, 1990s and early 2000 ==
=== The Permanent Fund of Alaska ===
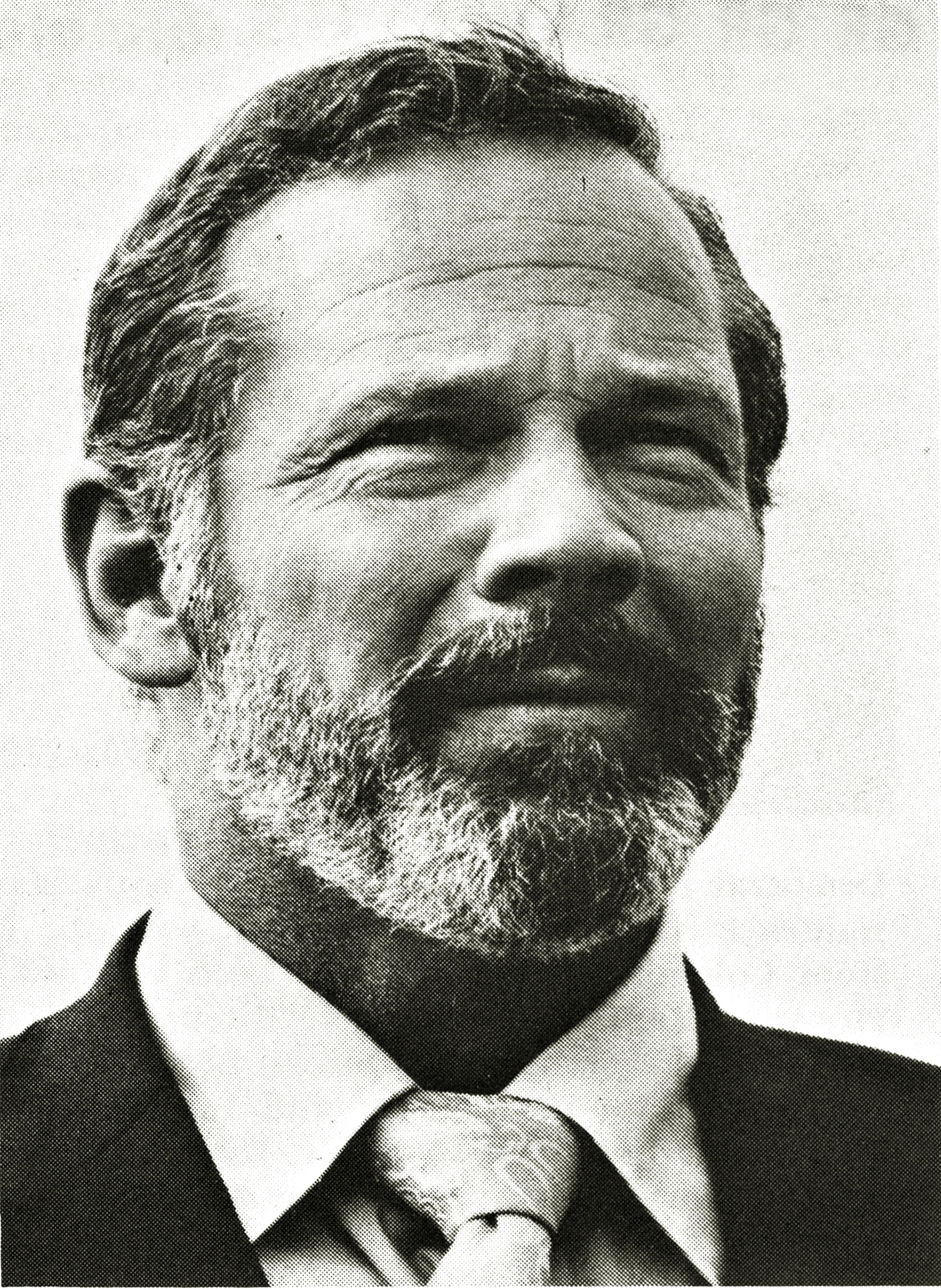
1975 photo of Jay Hammond, the former governor of Alaska who is regarded as "the man behind" the foundation of the Permanent Fund of Alaska

The Alaska Permanent Fund is often mentioned as one of the few existing basic income systems in the world. Since 1982, the Fund has paid a partial basic income to all (permanent) residents averaging approximately $1,600 annually per resident (adjusted to 2019 dollars) from the state's oil production revenues. A prominent figure in the history of the fund is Jay Hammond. He was the Republican Governor of Alaska in the 1970s and as such was concerned that the huge wealth generated by oil mining in Prudhoe Bay, the largest oilfield in North America, would only benefit the current population of the state. Therefore, he suggested setting up a fund to ensure that this wealth would be preserved, through investment of part of the revenue from oil.

== 2010–2018 ==
The Green Party of the United States since its 2010 platform advocates for a universal basic income to "every adult regardless of health, employment, or marital status, in order to minimize government bureaucracy and intrusiveness into people's lives."

The debate about basic income, according to Guy Standing, has gone in two directions in the United States in recent years. On the one hand is the introduction of basic income as an alternative to existing social policies, paid from direct taxation, and on the other hand is a discussion about capital funds with basic income-style dividends.

In July 2017, Hawaii State Representative Chris Lee published a bill to investigate basic income for his state.

American Democratic Politician John Moser ran on a Universal Citizens Dividend as the core focus of his 2018 US Congressional campaign.

In April 2021, a bill to send unconditional monthly cash payments of $1,000 to California residents passed committee, though with no funding mechanism.

== Andrew Yang and the emergency-basic income of 2020 ==
Andrew Yang was a presidential candidate for the 2020 Democratic Party presidential primaries. He was running against more well-known candidates such as Joe Biden, Bernie Sanders, and Elizabeth Warren for the Democratic Party-ticket to run against the Republican candidate in 2020. His flagship proposal was a basic income, which he labeled a "Freedom Dividend" of 1000 dollars per month to each American citizen over the age of 18. He also had several other proposals, regarding democracy, health and medicine, international affairs and so on, but the focal point of his campaign was basic income. That, in turn, is a proposal which he outlined with the background of the fourth industrial revolution. In other words, the development of automation and artificial intelligence, and how these factors change the job market. According to Yang, the Freedom Dividend's benefits include "healthier people, less stressed-out people, better-educated people, stronger communities, more volunteerism, [and] more civic participation. There's zero bureaucracy associated with it [because there is no] need to verify whether [people's] circumstances change."

Yang argues that automation-driven job displacement was the main reason Donald Trump won the 2016 presidential election, saying that based on data, "There's a straight line up between the adoption of industrial robots in a community and the movement towards Donald Trump." Yang has said that he became a UBI advocate after reading American futurist Martin Ford's book Rise of the Robots: Technology and the Threat of a Jobless Future, which deals with the impact of automation and artificial intelligence on the job market and economy. He believes UBI is a more viable policy than job retraining programs, citing studies that job retraining of displaced manufacturing workers in the Midwest had success rates of 0–15%.

On March 5, 2020 Andrew Yang started the Humanity Forward (HF) movement, a non-profit with the goal of introducing the core ideas that Yang ran on during his 2020 presidential campaign such as Universal Basic Income, human-centered capitalism, and data as a property right. By March 2020, Yang had received three million dollars in donations for use in this organization. HF endorses and provides resources to political candidates who champion Universal Basic Income, human-centered capitalism and similar policies. HF will help launch and support projects to display the power and practicality of UBI in real life. Yang intends to push these ideas to the mainstream through podcasts, traditional media, and high-impact events.

== COVID-19 era ==
With a flood of federal COVID-19 recovery money going to local governments, over 150 municipalities and counties in the United States ran guaranteed income programs, including one that supported all new mothers in Flint, Michigan. Local government cash aid without any work requirement was subsequently banned in Arkansas, Idaho, Iowa, and South Dakota, and considered in several other conservative states. Ban attempts were vetoed by Democratic governors in Wisconsin and Arizona.

== See also ==
- 2020 CARES Act unemployment benefits
