= David C. Hespe =

Former Commissioner of the New Jersey Department of Education

David Hespe, twice, was Commissioner of the New Jersey Department of Education. He was appointed by Governor Chris Christie. He was appointed Acting Commissioner in February 2014 was confirmed by the Senate in December 2014. He resigned in September 2016.

He is Of Counsel at Porzio, Bromberg & Newman, P.C.

== Education ==
- Rutgers University School of Law, Newark, NJ, J.D., 1985
- Rutgers College, Newark, NJ, B.A., 1982
