= Third-party and independent candidates for the 2016 United States presidential election =

Third-party and independent candidates for the 2016 U.S. presidential election
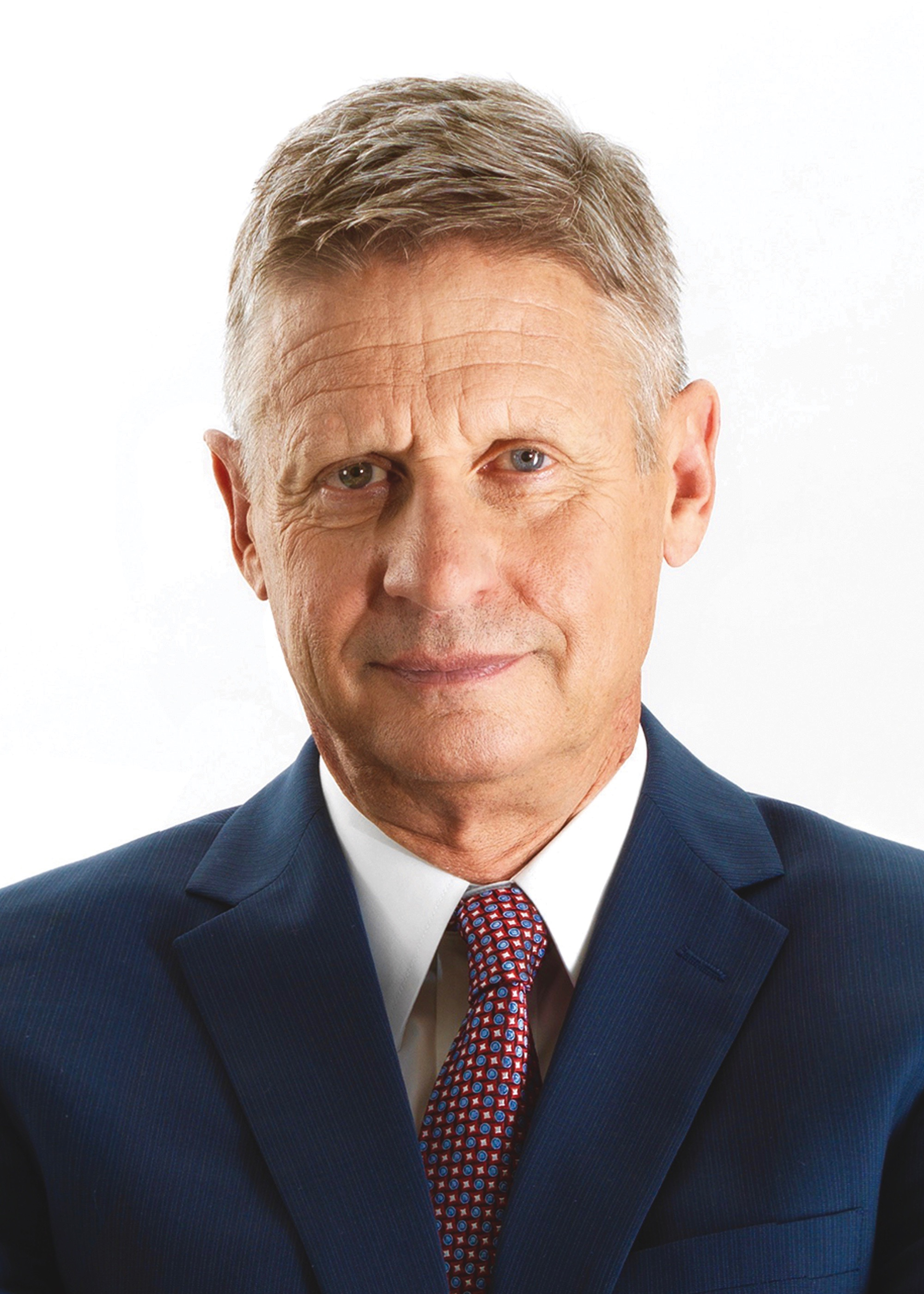

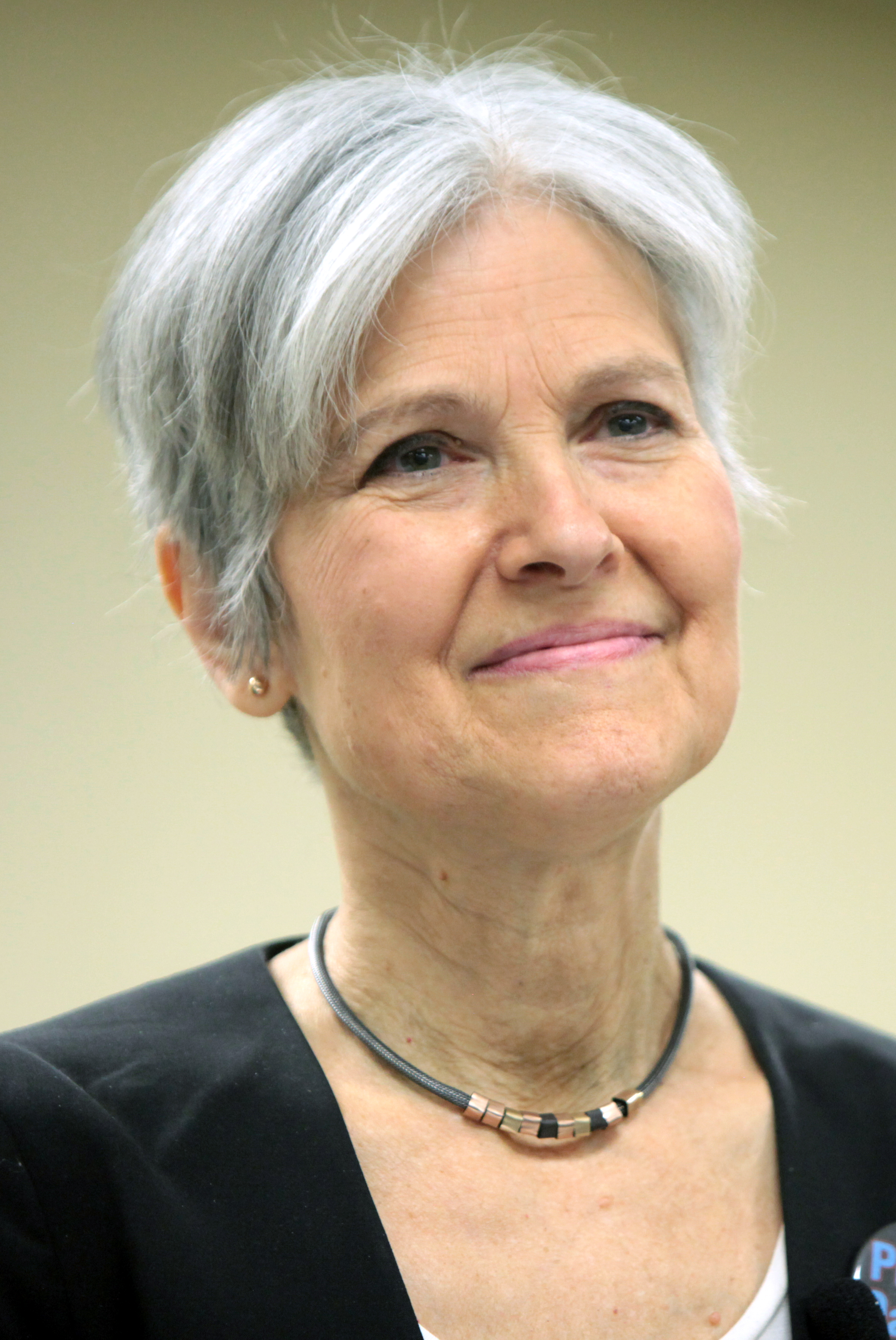

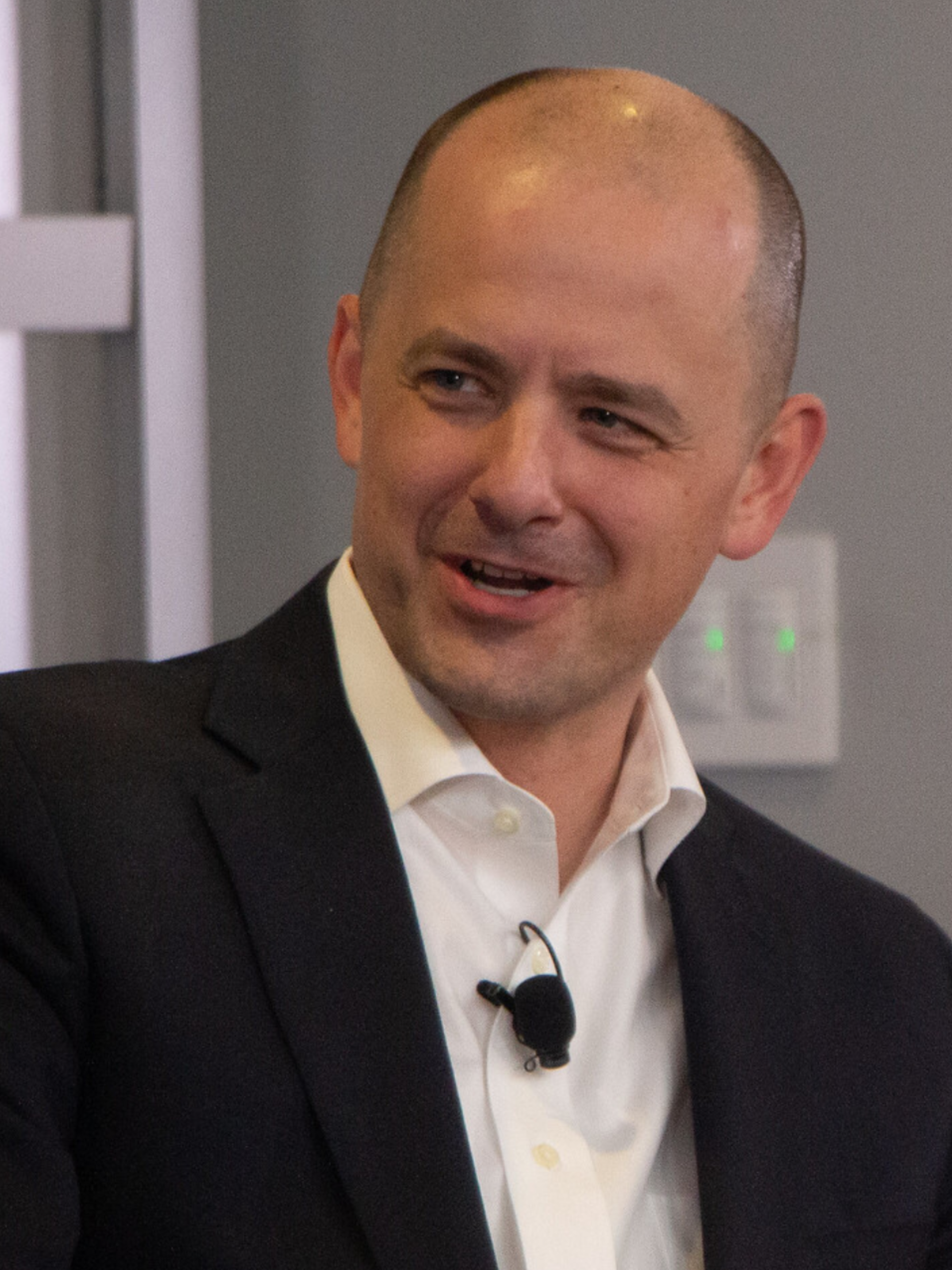

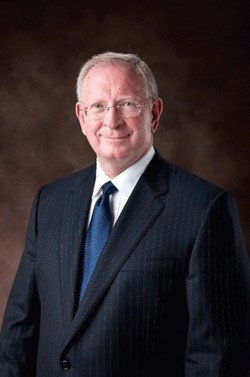

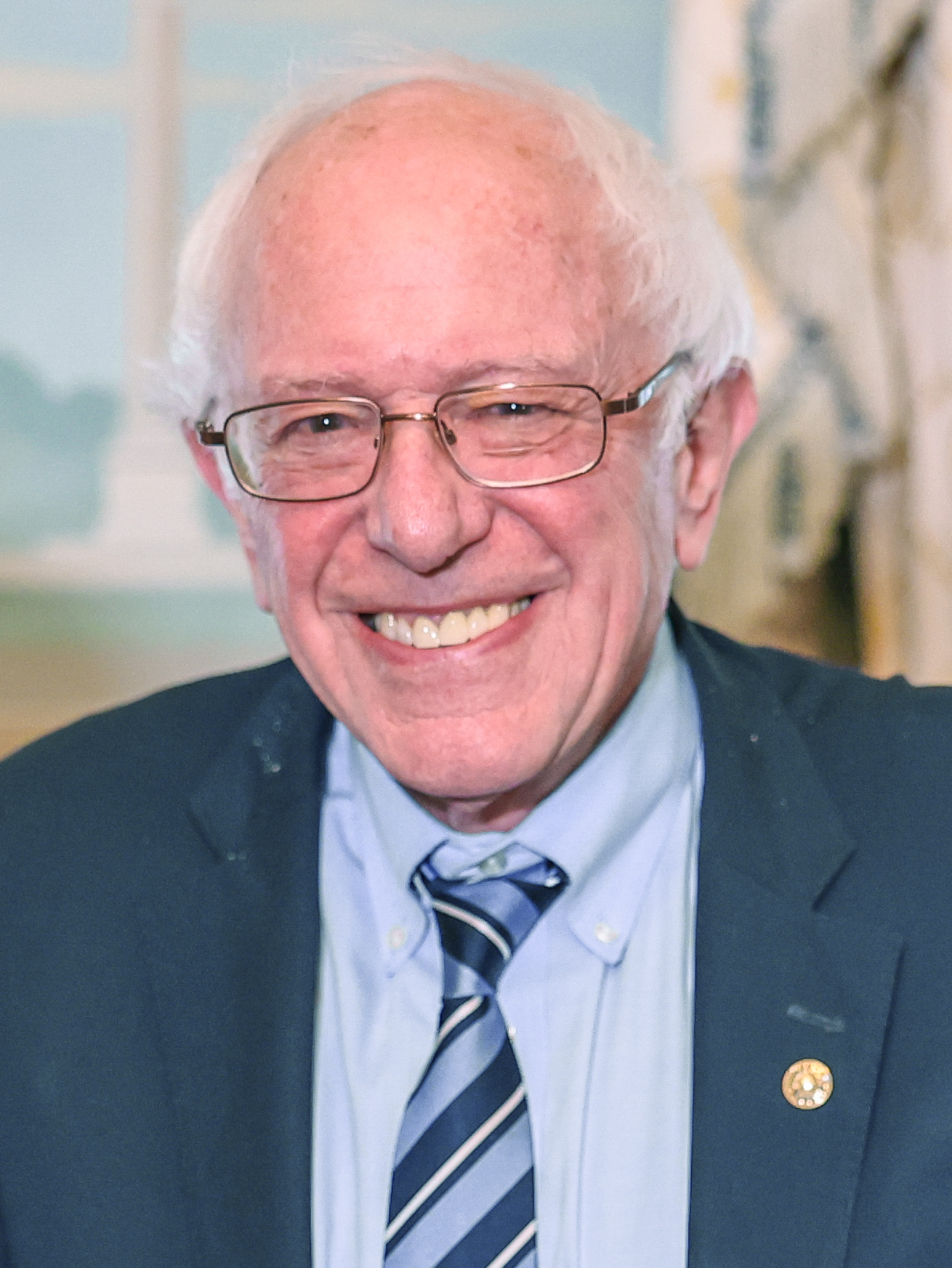

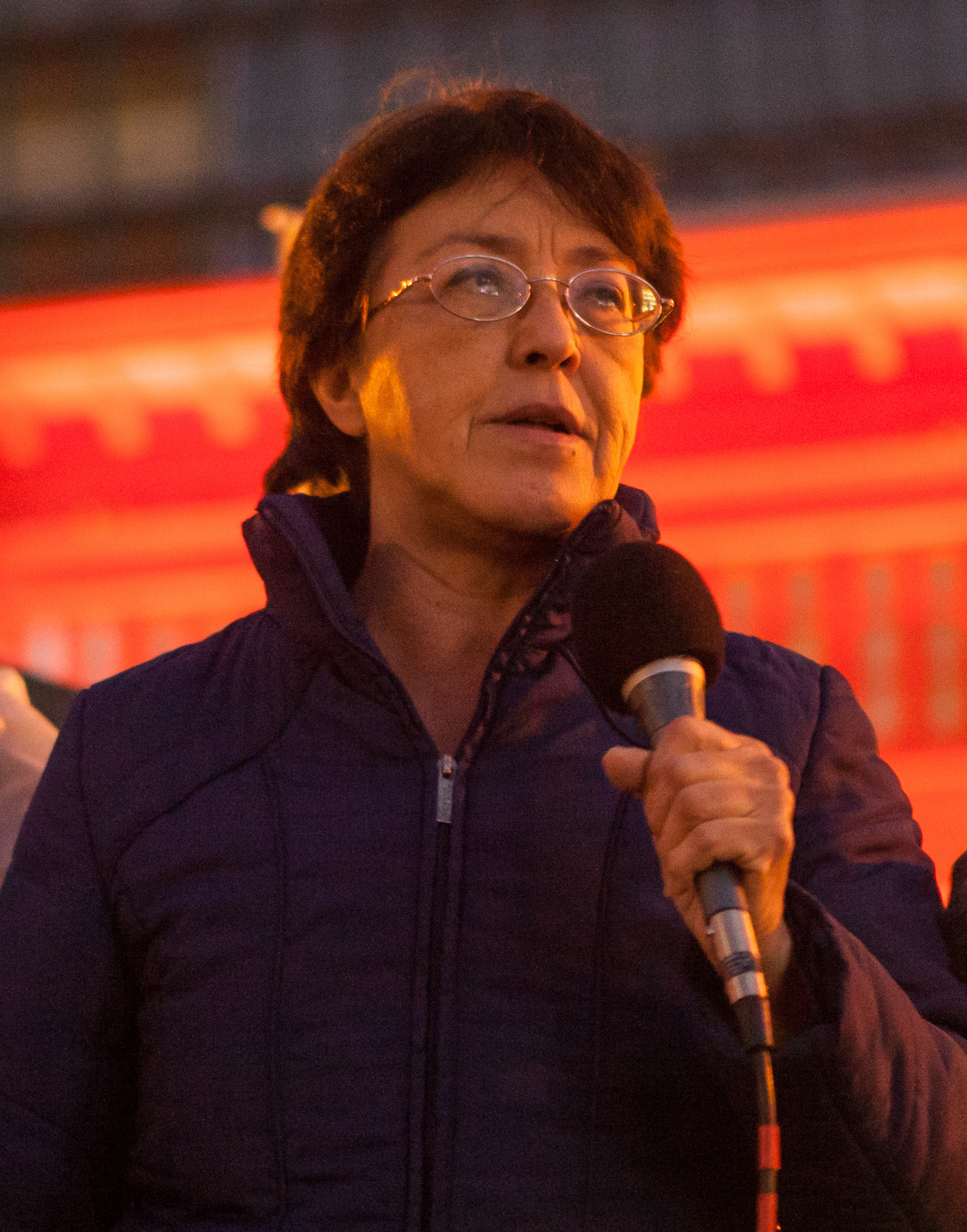

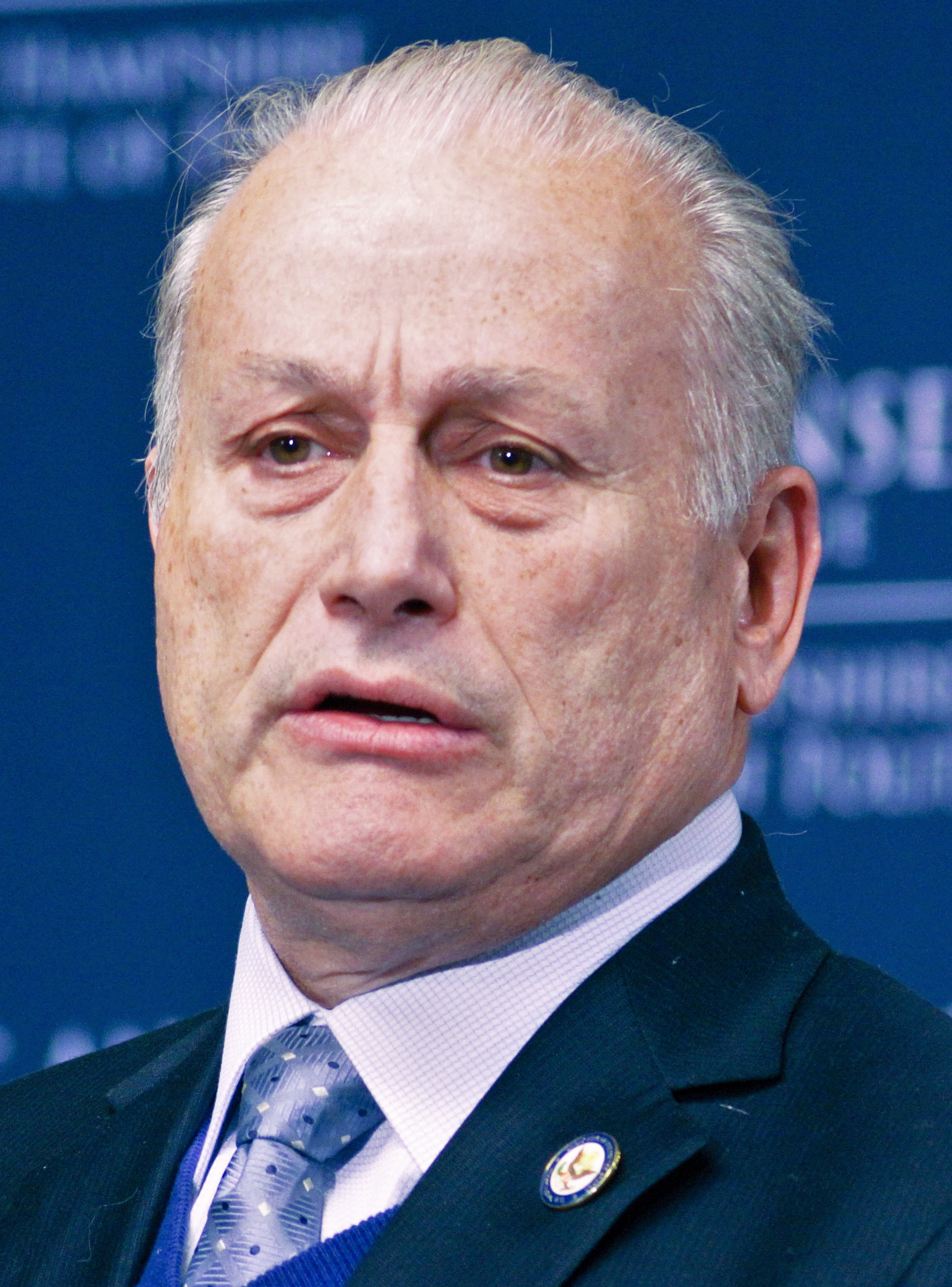

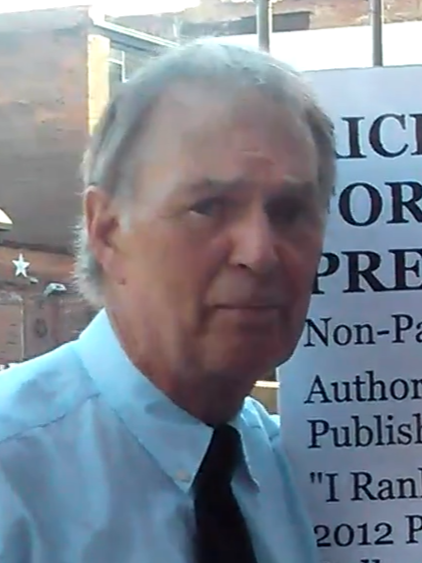

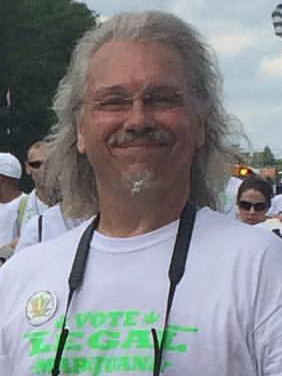
Nominee	Gary Johnson	Jill Stein	Evan McMullin
Party	Libertarian	Green	Independent
Alliance			Better for America
Home state	New Mexico	Massachusetts	Utah
Running mate	Bill Weld	Ajamu Baraka	Mindy Finn
Popular vote	4,443,505	1,457,218	731,991
Percentage	3.28%	1.07%	0.54%
Nominee	Darrell Castle	Bernie Sanders (write-in)	Gloria La Riva
Party	Constitution	Independent	Socialism and Liberation
Home state	Tennessee	Vermont	California
Running mate	Scott Bradley	Elizabeth Warren (Note: Having lost the Democratic primaries and endorsed Clinton, Sanders did not officially have a running mate. However, a faithless elector voted for Sanders as president and Warren as vice president.)	Eugene Puryear
Electoral vote		1
Popular vote	203,090	111,850	74,401
Percentage	0.15%	0.08%	0.05%
Nominee	Rocky De La Fuente	Richard Duncan	Dan Vacek
Party	Reform	Independent	Legal Marijuana Now
Alliance	American Delta
Home state	California	Ohio	Minnesota
Running mate	Michael Steinberg	Ricky Johnson	Mark Elworth Jr.
Popular vote	33,117	24,307	13,537
Percentage	0.02%	0.02%	0.01%

This article contains lists of official and potential third-party and independent candidates associated with the 2016 United States presidential election.

"Third party" is a term commonly used in the United States in reference to political parties other than the two major parties, the Democratic Party and the Republican Party. An independent candidate is one who runs for office with no formal party affiliation.

Ballot access in states holding 270 or more electoral votes represents a majority of the 538 electoral votes in the Electoral College. The number of electoral votes for which a party or independent candidate has secured ballot access may increase as those parties or candidates complete their petitions, and filings for ballot access, until September 2016 when the last petition deadlines occur.

According to the Green Papers website, 31 people were on the ballot in at least one state, while 192, including those who were on ballots in some states, obtained recognition as official write-in candidates.

== Summary ==
On the ballot in every state, Libertarian nominee Gary Johnson received 4,489,221 total votes, about 3.3% of ballots cast, the most for any third- party candidate. By votes cast, Johnson performed best in California where he received 478,500 votes. By percentage, Johnson performed best in his home state of New Mexico where he received about 9.3% of the vote. Johnson received more than 5% of the vote in Maine, Colorado, Wyoming, South Dakota, Montana, Oklahoma, Alaska and North Dakota.

Green Party nominee Jill Stein received 1,457,216 total votes, a little more than 1% of ballots cast, the second most for any third-party candidate. By votes cast, Stein also performed best in California where she received 278,657 votes. By percentage, Stein performed best in Hawaii where she received about 3% of the vote.

Despite being in third place among third-party candidates with only 731,788 total votes, Independent candidate Evan McMullin received 243,690 votes, 21.5% of the vote, in Utah. This was the highest percentage of votes for any third-party candidate in 2016 and the highest percentage for any third-party candidate since Ross Perot in 1992. McMullin also received almost 7% of the vote in Idaho.

Constitution Party nominee Darrell Castle received 203,090 votes, the fourth most for any third-party candidate. Castle received more than 1% of the vote in Alaska and South Dakota.

Despite not officially running for President, Independent Senator Bernie Sanders received 111,850 write-in votes, the fifth most for any third-party candidate. Sanders received 18,183 write-in votes, about 6% of the vote, in his home state of Vermont.

In Nevada, None of these candidates received 28,863 votes, 2.5% of the states votes.

2016 U.S. presidential election results for candidates that received at least 1000 votes
State	Hillary Clinton	Donald Trump	Gary Johnson	Jill Stein	Evan McMullin	Darrell Castle	Bernie Sanders	Gloria La Riva	Rocky De La Fuente	Richard Duncan	Dan Vacek	Alyson Kennedy	Mike Smith	Chris Keniston	Mike Maturen	Lynn Kahn	James Hedges	Tom Hoefling	Monica Moorehead	Emidio Soltysik	Laurence Kotlikoff	Peter Skewes	Rocky Giordani	Scott Copeland	Kyle Kopitke
State	Democratic	Republican	Libertarian	Green		Constitution		PSL	Reform		Legal Marijuana Now	Socialist Workers		Veterans	American Solidarity		Prohibition	America's	Workers World	Socialist		American	Independent American	Constitution Idaho	
	1	2	3	4	5	6	7	8	9	10	11	12	13	14	15	16	17	18	19	20	21	22	23	24	25
Alabama	729,547	1,318,255	44,467	9,391																					
Alaska	116,454	163,387	18,725	5,735		3,866			1,240																
Arizona	1,161,167	1,252,401	106,327	34,345	17,449	1,058			29				62					85			52				
Arkansas	380,494	684,872	29,949	9,473	13,176	4,613										3,390	4,709								
California	8,753,788	4,483,810	478,500	278,657	39,596		79,341	66,101							1,316						402				
Colorado	1,338,870	1,202,484	144,121	38,437	28,917	11,699		531	1,255			452	1,819	5,028	862		185	710		271	392				1,096
Connecticut	897,572	673,215	48,676	22,841	2,108	147		41	12				12					31			23	4			
Delaware	221,608	175,162	14,045	5,868	706	74		3	3	1			3			1		7							
Florida	4,504,975	4,617,886	207,043	64,399		16,475			9,108	25											74				
Georgia	1,877,963	2,089,104	125,306	7,674	13,017	1,110							53		151			70			34				
Hawaii	266,891	128,847	15,954	12,737		4,508																			
Idaho	189,765	409,055	28,331	8,496	46,476	4,403			1,373				1	9	35			21			3			2,356	
Illinois	3,090,729	2,146,015	209,596	76,802	11,655	1,138												175			82				
Indiana	1,033,126	1,557,286	133,993	7,841		1,413			21	25								269	0	57	49				
Iowa	653,669	800,983	59,186	11,479	12,366	5,355		323	451		2,246					2,247									
Kansas	427,005	671,018	55,406	23,506	6,520	646		7	3				6		214	2	3	45	0				0		
Kentucky	628,854	1,202,971	53,752	13,913	22,780	438			1,128	2			9	22	155			39			8				
Louisiana	780,154	1,178,638	37,978	14,031	8,547	3,129		446				480		1,881				1,581			1,048				
Maine	357,735	335,593	38,105	14,251	1,887	333															16				
Maryland	1,677,928	943,169	79,605	35,945	9,630	566		48	14	18			13		504	18	5	42		6	73				
Massachusetts	1,995,196	1,090,893	138,018	47,661	2,719														15		28				
Michigan	2,268,839	2,279,543	172,136	51,463	8,177	16,139									517			95	30	2,209	87				
Minnesota	1,367,716	1,322,951	112,972	36,985	53,076	9,456		12	1,431	1	11,291	1,672	3	31	244			28		15	17				
Mississippi	485,131	700,714	14,435	3,731		3,987			644								715								
Missouri	1,071,068	1,594,511	97,359	25,419	7,071	13,092			6									48			28				
Montana	177,709	279,240	28,037	7,970	2,297	296			1,570	0			1			0	0	10	0	1	7				
Nebraska	284,494	495,961	38,946	8,775																					
Nevada	539,260	512,058	37,384			5,268			2,552																
New Hampshire	348,526	345,790	30,777	6,496	1,064		4,493		678																
New Jersey	2,148,278	1,601,933	72,477	37,772		6,161		1,682	1,838			2,156							1,749						
New Mexico	385,234	319,666	74,541	9,879	5,825	1,514		1,184	475																
New York	4,665,740	3,078,946	174,951	106,995	10,397	801		147	30					84	409	72		127	65	34					
North Carolina	2,189,316	2,362,631	130,126	12,105																					
North Dakota	93,758	216,794	21,434	3,780		1,833			364																
Ohio	2,394,164	2,841,005	174,498	46,271	12,574	1,887				24,235			62	114	552			268	19		90				
Oklahoma	420,375	949,136	83,481																						
Oregon	1,002,106	782,403	94,231	50,002																					
Pennsylvania	2,926,441	2,970,733	146,715	49,941	6,472	21,572	6,060																		
Rhode Island	252,525	180,543	14,746	6,220	773	52	3,497	8	671					6	34			7							
South Carolina	855,373	1,155,389	49,204	13,034	21,016	5,765																3,246			
South Dakota	117,458	227,721	20,850			4,064																			
Tennessee	870,695	1,522,925	70,397	15,993	11,991	1,584			4,075			2,877	7,276					132			20				
Texas	3,877,868	4,685,047	283,492	71,558	42,366	4,261									1,401			932	122	72	1,037				
Utah	310,674	515,211	39,608	9,438	243,690	8,032			872			521							544				2,732		
Vermont	178,573	95,369	10,078	6,758	640	63	18,218	327	1,063	0	0	2	1	3	19	0	0	0	0	1	2	0	0	0	0
Virginia	1,981,473	1,769,443	118,274	27,638	54,054																				
Washington	1,539,287	1,063,835	134,096	46,872		14,565		2,779				3,583													
Washington, D.C.	282,830	12,723	4,906	4,258																					
West Virginia	188,794	489,371	23,004	8,075	1,104	3,807																			
Wisconsin	1,382,536	1,405,284	106,674	31,072	11,855	12,162			1,502					67	284			80	1,770	33	15				
Wyoming	55,973	174,419	13,287	2,515		2,042			709																
TOTAL	65,853,516	62,984,825	4,443,505	1,457,216	731,991	199,354	111,609	73,639	33,117	24,307	13,537	11,743	9,321	7,245	6,697	5,730	5,617	4,802	4,314	4,056	3,587	3,250	2,732	2,356	1,096

Results by county, shaded according to percentage of the vote for Gary Johnson

Results by county, shaded according to percentage of the vote for Jill Stein

Results by county, shaded according to percentage of the vote for Evan McMullin

== Candidates ==
=== Gary Johnson, Libertarian Party ===
Ballot access: The Libertarian ticket was on all 51 ballots.

Name	Prior positions	State	Nominated	Vice presidential nominee
Gary Johnson (campaign)	Governor of New Mexico, 1995–2003; Libertarian Party presidential nominee, 2012	New Mexico	May 29, 2016	Bill Weld of Massachusetts
Other parties	National total	National percentage	Highest single state total	Highest single state percentage
Independence Party of New York	4,489,221	3.3%	402,452 (3.4%); California	74,031 (9.3%); New Mexico

Nationally, Johnson captured 5 percent or more of the vote in eight states: New Mexico, North Dakota, Alaska, Oklahoma, South Dakota, Montana, Wyoming and Maine.

==== Poll standings ====
All major polling outfits included Johnson in their published results. His highest total was 13% in a CNN/ORC poll taken in July. After that he has generally was in the upper single digits, breaking 10% on October 10 in a Politico/Morning Consult poll.

Johnson's greatest statewide percentage was in his home state of New Mexico, where he reached the mid-twenties in September before falling back into the teens. He polled in the teens in several other states, most recently in a WBUR/MassINC poll taken in New Hampshire on November 1.

==== Party nomination contest ====
There were six primaries, Gary Johnson received 22,642 votes while none of the others received as much as 4,000.

Libertarian National Convention presidential vote, 2016
Candidate	First ballot	Percentage	Second ballot	Percentage
Gary Johnson	458	49.5%	518	55.8%
Austin Petersen	197	21.3%	203	21.9%
John McAfee	131	14.2%	131	14.1%
Darryl W. Perry	63	6.8%	52	5.6%
Marc Allan Feldman	58	6.3%	18	1.9%
Kevin McCormick	9	1.0%	1 (write-in)	0.1%
None of the above	5	0.5%	2	0.2%
Ron Paul (write-in)	1	0.1%		
Vermin Supreme (write-in)	1	0.1%		
Heidi Zemen (write-in)	1	0.1%		
Derrick Grayson (write-in)	1	0.1%	1	0.1%
Michael Shannon (write-in)			1	0.1%
Rhett Smith (write-in)			1	0.1%
Totals	928	100%		

=== Jill Stein, Green Party ===
Ballot access (write-in included): 47 states + DC

Name	Prior positions	State	Nominated	Vice presidential nominee
Jill Stein (campaign)	Lexington Town Meeting member (2005–2011); Green Party presidential nominee, 2012	Massachusetts	August 6, 2016	Ajamu Baraka of Washington, D.C.
National total	National percentage	Highest single state total	Highest single state percentage	Notes
1,457,216	1.1%	278,657 (1.9%); California	12,737 (3.0%); Hawaii	This is the first fourth-place finisher to breach the one million mark since 1948

==== Poll standings ====
All major polling outfits included Stein in their published results. Her highest total was 6% in McClatchy/Marist poll taken early August. After that her highest total was 4% in a CBS/New York Times poll taken in late October. She generally polled at 2 or 3%.

In statewide polling she reached as high as 7% in an Emerson College poll from Vermont in September.

==== Party nomination contest ====
Five additional candidates sought the Green Party nomination.

Green National Convention presidential roll call vote, 2016
Candidate	First Ballot	Percentage
Jill Stein	233.5	81.6%
William Kreml	18.25	6.4%
Sedinam Moyowasifza-Curry	14.5	5.1%
Darryl Cherney	8.5	3.0%
Kent Mesplay	7.5	2.6%
Elijah Manley	3.25	1.1%
No candidate	0.5	0.2%
Totals	286	100%
Turnout	286	71.1%

=== Evan McMullin, Better for America Group and others ===
The anti-Donald Trump Better for America PAC recruited Evan McMullin as a candidate for president. He was on the ballot in 11 states and had write-in access in several others.

Name	Prior positions	State	Announced candidacy	Vice presidential candidate	Notes
Evan McMullin (campaign)	Chief Policy Director for the House Republican Conference, 2015–2016; CIA agent, 2001–2011	Utah	August 8, 2016	Mindy Finn of the District of Columbia	See also: Better for America^{A} (as Independence Party of Minnesota nominee); Nathan Johnson, a resident of San Diego, appears as McMullin's running mate on numerous state ballots.
Other parties	National total	National percentage	Highest single state total	Highest single state percentage	
Independence Party of South Carolina; Independence Party of Minnesota	731,709	0.4%	233,266 (21.4%) (Utah)	233,266 (21.4%) (Utah)	Aside from his large total in Utah, the ticket came in third in Idaho, and fourth in seven of the nine other states where it was on the ballot.

=== Darrell Castle, Constitution Party ===
Electoral votes: 207 (Scott Copeland had access to 4 electoral votes in Idaho, where Castle is on the ballot as an independent)

Write-in included: 406

Ballot access: Alaska, Arkansas, Colorado, Florida, Hawaii, Idaho, Iowa, Louisiana, Michigan, Minnesota, Mississippi, Missouri, Nevada, New Jersey, New Mexico, North Dakota, Pennsylvania, South Carolina, South Dakota, Utah, Washington, West Virginia, Wisconsin, Wyoming.
Write-in access: Alabama, Arizona, Delaware, Georgia, Illinois, Indiana, Kansas, Kentucky, Maine, Maryland, Montana, New Hampshire, Ohio, Oregon, Rhode Island, Tennessee, Texas, Vermont, Virginia.

Name	Prior positions	State	Nominated	Vice presidential nominee
Darrell Castle	Attorney, Constitution Party vice presidential nominee, 2008	Tennessee	April 16, 2016	Scott N. Bradley of Utah
Other parties	National total	National percentage	Highest single state total	Highest single state percentage
Taxpayer's Party; Michigan	203,069	0.1%	21,010 (0.4%); Pennsylvania	3,311 (1.2%); Alaska

==== Poll standings ====
Castle was not featured in any national polls. He was listed in a few in Utah in August and September, where he got as much as 2%, and in Nevada, where he got 1%.

==== Nomination contest ====
The 2016 presidential nominating convention was held in Salt Lake City, on April 13–16.

Constitution Party National Convention presidential vote, 2016
Candidate	Votes	Percentage	Notes
Darrell Castle	184	54.2%	received 181,741 votes (0.1%) in the general election
Scott Copeland (Texas)	103.5	30.5%	On the ballot in Idaho as the Constitution Party's presidential nominee,
Tom Hoefling	19	5.6%	Sought 2016 American Independent Party presidential nomination American Independent Party presidential nominee, 2012 America's Party presidential nominee, 2012, 2016
Daniel Cummings (Wyoming)	9	2.7%	
J. R. Myers (Alaska)	9	2.7%	Sought 2016 American Independent Party presidential nomination, on the ballot in Idaho as the Constitution Party's vice-presidential nominee,
Don Grundmann (California)	6	1.8%	Sought 2008 and 2012 Constitution Party presidential nomination
John Diamond (Pennsylvania)	5	1.5%	
Jeremy Friedbaum (Utah)	4	1.2%	
Totals	339.5	100.0%	

=== Gloria La Riva, multiple parties ===
Electoral votes: 80 (Gloria LaRiva has a combined 135 electoral votes via the Party for Socialism and Liberation, the Peace and Freedom Party, and the Liberty Union Party)

Ballot access: California, Colorado, Florida, Louisiana, New Jersey, New Mexico, Vermont, Washington

Name	Prior positions	State	Nominated	Vice presidential nominee	Notes
Gloria La Riva	Newspaper printer and activist Peace and Freedom Party presidential nominee, 2016, Party for Socialism and Liberation presidential nominee, 2008; Workers World Party presidential nominee, 1992	New Mexico	July 2015	Eugene Puryear of Washington, D.C. Dennis Banks of Minnesota (in CA only)	Puryear appeared on the Vermont ballot as the Liberty Union Party ticket; Puryear is Constitutionally ineligible to serve as Vice President – under age 35; Banks appeared as the vice-presidential candidate on the Peace and Freedom ticket in California.
State parties	National total	National percentage	Peace and Freedom total	Other party total	
Party for Socialism and Liberation; Peace and Freedom (California); Liberty Union (Vermont).	74,405	0.1%	53,133	7,857	

==== Party for Socialism and Liberation ====
La Riva was on the ballot in numerous states under this banner and as an independent.

==== Liberty Union Party (Vermont) ====
La Riva won the primary in Vermont and thus was awarded the ballot line there.

La Riva participated in the Free and Equal presidential debate.

==== Peace and Freedom Party ====
===== Peace and Freedom Party primary =====
La Riva won the primary in California and thus was awarded the ballot line at the state convention. Jill Stein, who was on the Green party primary ballot was removed from the PF one.

California Peace and Freedom presidential primary (June 7, 2016)
Candidate	Votes	Percentage
Gloria Estela La Riva	2,232	49%
Monica Moorehead	1,369	30%
Lynn Sandra Kahn	963	21%
Jill Stein	(disqualified)	0%
Total	4,564	100%

===== Peace and Freedom Party convention =====
The Peace and Freedom Party selected La Riva as its nominee at its convention, held August 12-14 in Sacramento, California.

Peace and Freedom Party convention vote
Candidate	Votes	Percentage
Gloria Estela La Riva	58	72.50%
Monica Moorehead	12	15.00%
Jill Stein	9	11.25%
Lynn Sandra Kahn	1	1.25%
Total	80	100%

=== Rocky De La Fuente, American Delta and Reform Parties, plus others ===
Electoral votes: 147 (De La Fuente has access to a combined 147 electoral votes as an independent, via The American Delta Party and via The Reform Party)

Write-in included: 346 electors

Anticipated write-in included: 404 electors

Ballot access:

Under the ballot label "Reform Party" Florida

Under the ballot label "American Delta Party": Colorado, Iowa, Louisiana, Minnesota, Mississippi, New Jersey, New Mexico.

As an independent: Alaska, Idaho, Kentucky, Montana, Nevada, New Hampshire, North Dakota, Rhode Island Tennessee, Utah, Vermont, Wisconsin, Wyoming.

Write-in: Alabama, Arizona, California, Delaware, District of Columbia, Indiana, Maryland, Nebraska, New York, Pennsylvania, Oregon, Virginia, Kansas, West Virginia, Washington. Total 199 electors

Anticipated write-in: Connecticut, Missouri, South Dakota

No ballot access 2016: Georgia, Illinois, Maine, Massachusetts, Michigan, North Carolina, South Carolina.

Name	Prior positions	State	Announced candidacy	Vice presidential nominee	Notes
Rocky De La Fuente	Businessman	Florida	July 19, 2016	Michael Steinberg of Florida	Received 67,457 votes in the Democratic presidential primary Ran for the Democratic United States Senate nomination in Florida, 2016
State parties	National total	National percentage	Highest single state total	Highest single state percentage	
American Delta; Reform	33,136	0%	9,101 (0.1%); Florida	1,063 (0.3%); Vermont	

==== Poll standings ====
In August and September, De La Fuente polled 1% in Nevada in a poll conducted by Suffolk University.

==== American Delta party nomination ====
The American Delta Party is an organization specifically created to support De La Fuente's independent candidacy.

==== Reform party nomination ====
The Reform Party recognized the following other candidates as seeking its presidential nomination The vote totals nominating De La Fuente were never released.

Name	Notes
Ed Chlapowski	Owner/manager at Opportunity Resolution
Kenneth Cross	Semi-retired engineer and businessman 2012 Reform Party vice-presidential nominee
Lynn Kahn	Doctor of clinical psychology 2016 Peace and Freedom Party presidential candidate. Will appear on Arkansas and Iowa ballot.
Darcy Richardson	Author and historian 2012 Democratic Party presidential candidate

=== Richard Duncan, Independent ===
Name	State	Vice presidential nominee	national vote total	ballot access.
Richard Duncan	Ohio	Ricky Johnson	24,308 (0%)	18 (173) Ohio (Alabama, Alaska, Delaware, Florida, Idaho, Indiana, Iowa, Kentucky, Maryland, Minnesota, Montana, Nebraska, New Hampshire, New Jersey, Oregon, Pennsylvania, Rhode Island, Vermont, West Virginia)

=== Bernie Sanders ===
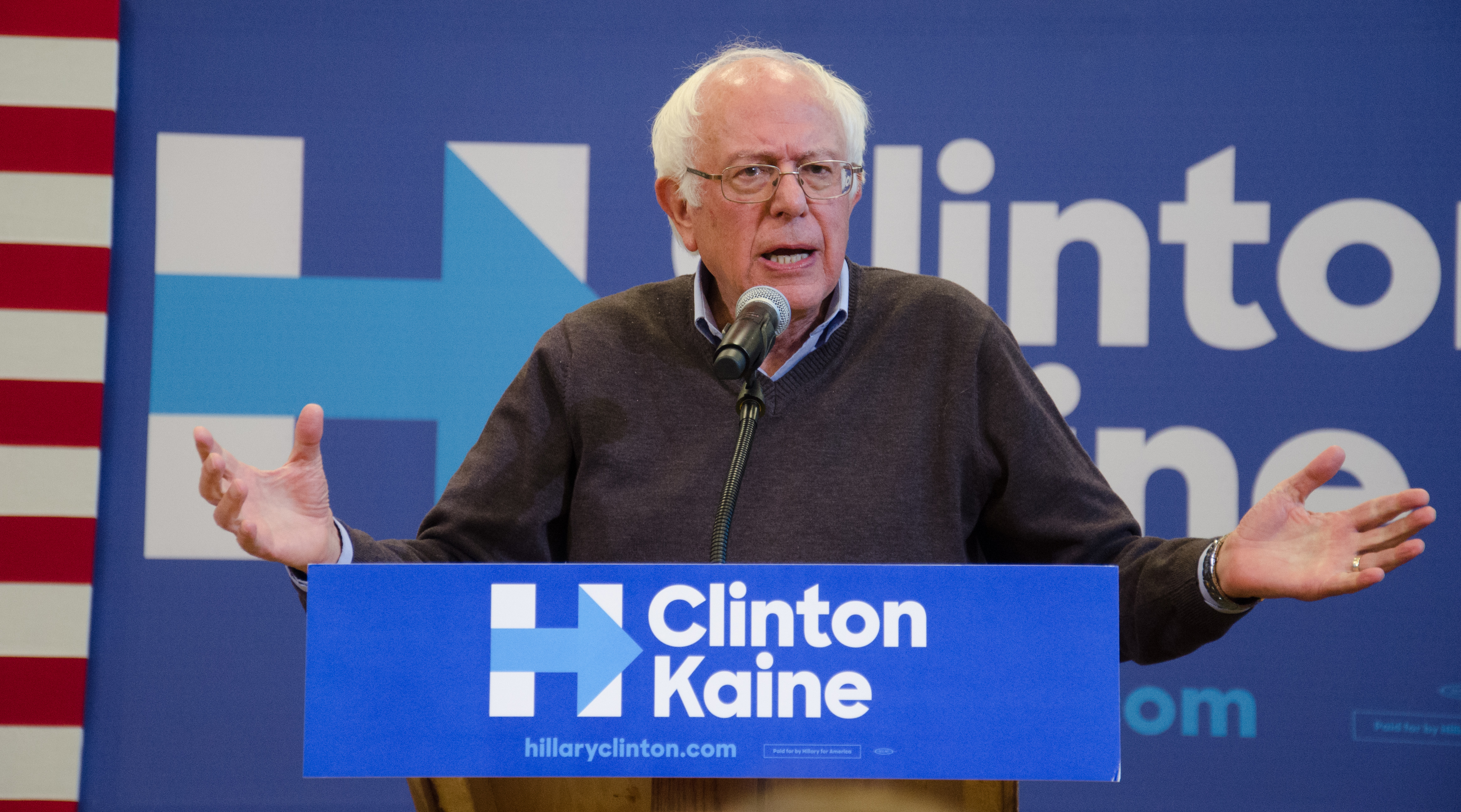
Sanders campaigning for Hillary Clinton at Nashua Community College in October 2016.

Several grassroots campaigns to elect Bernie Sanders President as a write-in candidate were established on social media in the run-up to the United States presidential election. Though Sanders continued to campaign for Democratic nominee Hillary Clinton, supporters pointed to alleged DNC bias in the Democratic Party's presidential primaries against Sanders, and Clinton's email scandal, and continued to support him. Both Clinton and Donald Trump would have had to win less than the required 270 electoral college votes for Sanders to have denied either candidate the presidency, and for the election to be passed to the House of Representatives - thus the initial write-in campaign around Vermont, offering only 3 electoral college votes, was unsuccessful. The campaign expanded to include all 12 eligible states (one of which listed Sanders as an official write-in candidate), and relied on states such as California, with a high electoral college vote count and large support for Sanders, to be successful in denying both Trump and Clinton. He has received over 100 thousand popular votes and one electoral vote. Two other electoral votes were disallowed.

Notably, he came in third in Vermont, coming ahead of both Gary Johnson and Jill Stein and taking 5.7% of the vote (18,183 tallied), something that has never happened before in a fall Presidential election.

=== Dan Vacek, Legal Marijuana Now Party ===
Ballot access: Iowa, Minnesota

Name	Prior positions	State	Nominated	Vice presidential nominee	National Popular vote
Dan Vacek	Financial Assistance Caseworker, Ramsey County, Minnesota	Minnesota	July 25, 2016	Mark Elworth of Nebraska	13,538 (0%)

=== Alyson Kennedy, Socialist Workers Party ===
Electoral votes: 70

Ballot access: Colorado, Louisiana, Minnesota, New Jersey, Tennessee, Utah, Washington

Name	Prior positions	State	Nominated	Vice presidential nominee	National vote total
Alyson Kennedy	Labor Organizer and Activist; Socialist Workers Party vice presidential nominee 2008	Illinois	February 12, 2016	Osborne Hart of Pennsylvania	12,467 (0%)

=== Chris Keniston, Veterans Party of America ===
Electoral votes: 15

Ballot access: Colorado, Mississippi

Name	Prior positions	State	Nominated	Vice presidential nominee	Popular vote
Chris Keniston	Reliability Engineer	Texas		Deacon Taylor of Florida	7,251 (0%)

=== Mike Maturen, American Solidarity Party ===
Electoral votes: 9; (as write-in) 332

Ballot access: Colorado; (as write-in) Alabama, Alaska, California, Georgia, Idaho, Iowa, Kansas, Kentucky, Maryland, Michigan, Minnesota, Nebraska, New Hampshire, New Jersey, New York, North Dakota, Ohio, Oregon, Pennsylvania, Rhode Island, Texas, Vermont, Virginia, Washington, Wisconsin

Name	Prior positions	State	Nominated	Vice presidential nominee	National total
Mike Maturen	Sales professional	Michigan	July 9, 2016	Juan Muñoz	6,797 (0%)

=== James Hedges, Prohibition Party ===
Electoral votes: 21

Ballot access: Arkansas, Colorado, Mississippi

Name	Prior positions	State	Announced candidacy	Nominated	Vice presidential nominee
James Hedges	Tax Assessor, Thompson Township, Fulton County, Pennsylvania (2002–2007); American Independent Party presidential candidate, 2016; Prohibition Party presidential candidate, 2012	Pennsylvania	July 2015	July 31, 2015	Bill Bayes of Mississippi
State parties	National total	National percentage	Highest single state total	Highest single state percentage	
	5,617	0%			

=== Tom Hoefling, America's Party ===
Electoral votes: 44

Ballot access: Arkansas, Colorado, Florida

Name	Prior positions	State	Announced candidacy	Vice presidential nominee	National total
Tom Hoefling	Political activist American Independent Party and Constitution Party presidential candidate, 2016; American Independent Party and America's Party presidential nominee, 2012	Iowa	January 2016	Steve Schulin of South Carolina	4,856

=== Monica Moorehead, Workers World Party ===
Electoral votes: 30

Ballot access: New Jersey, Utah, Wisconsin
(Texas)

Name	Prior positions	State	Nominated	Vice presidential nominee	National total	National percentage
Monica Moorehead	Perennial candidate and activist	New Jersey	November 8, 2015	Lamont Lilly	4,319	0%

=== Peter Skewes, American Party (South Carolina) ===
Electoral votes: 9

Ballot access: South Carolina

Name	Prior positions	State	Announced candidacy	Vice presidential nominee	National total
Peter Skewes	Professor, Clemson University	South Carolina	May 15, 2016	Michael Lacy	3,246

=== Laurence Kotlikoff, Independent ===
Name	Prior positions	State	Announced candidacy	Vice presidential candidate	Ballot access	Total popular vote (percentage)
Laurence Kotlikoff	Economics professor at Boston University	Massachusetts		Edward E. Leamer of California	* On ballot: Colorado, Louisiana: As write-in: Alabama, Alaska, Arizona, Florida, Georgia, Idaho, Illinois, Indiana, Iowa, Kentucky, Maine, Maryland, Massachusetts, Michigan, Montana, New Hampshire, New Jersey, North Dakota, Ohio, Oregon, Pennsylvania, Rhode Island, Tennessee, Texas, Utah, Vermont, Washington, West Virginia	3,603 (0%)

=== Rocky Giordani, Independent American Party ===
Electoral votes: 18

Ballot access: New Mexico, Oregon, Utah

Name	Prior positions	State	Nominated	Vice presidential nominee	National total
Rocky Giordani	Author	Utah	November 7, 2015	Farley Anderson	2,752

=== Emidio "Mimi" Soltysik, Socialist Party USA ===
Electoral votes: 25

Ballot access: Colorado, Michigan

Socialist Party USA selected its ticket at a national convention held October 16–18, 2015, in Milwaukee, Wisconsin.

Name	Prior positions	State	Nominated	Vice presidential nominee
Mimi Soltysik	Former National Co-chair, Socialist Party USA	California	October 17, 2015	Angela Walker of Wisconsin
Other parties	National total	National percentage		
Natural Law Party (Michigan)	2,705	0%		

=== Rod Silva, Nutrition Party ===
Electoral votes: 9

Ballot access: Colorado

Name	Prior positions	State	Nominated	Vice presidential nominee	popular vote
Rod Silva	Restaurateur	New Jersey	October 20, 2015	Richard Silva	751 (0%)

=== Jerry White, Socialist Equality Party ===
Electoral votes: 8

Ballot access: Louisiana

Name	Prior positions	State	Nominated	Vice presidential nominee	Total popular vote
Jerry White	Labor editor, World Socialist Web Site; Socialist Equality Party presidential nominee, 1996, 2008, and 2012	Michigan	April 22, 2016	Niles Niemuth of Wisconsin (Constitutionally ineligible – under age 35)	485 nationwide.

== Other candidate considerations ==
=== American Independent and other fusion tickets ===
Several states, most notably New York, permit fusion tickets. A fusion ticket is when a candidate or candidates are permitted more than one ballot line by being nominated by one or more third parties and permitting the votes on all lines to be added together for a single state total.

The Clinton/Kaine ticket was on the ballot in New York on the Women's Equality and Working Families Party lines, while the Trump/Pence ticket was on the Conservative party there as well as the American Independent Party in California.

==== Conservative party nomination in New York ====
The party's nominee was Donald Trump. The state committee nominated him by voice vote.

Total popular vote: 271,961 (3.8%)

==== Working Families party nomination in New York ====
Initially, the Working Families Party had endorsed Bernie Sanders for president, but when he conceded defeat at the Democratic convention and endorsed Hillary Clinton, the party had a mail in primary where Clinton defeated Jill Stein and "no endorsement" with 68% of the vote, preferring fusion rather than "asking voters to cast a vote that is at best meaningless and at worst destructive of progressive possibility."

Total popular vote: 130,245 (1.8%)

==== Woman's Equality party nomination in New York ====
A faction of the party's executive committee nominated Dr. Lynn Sandra Kahn, while another nominated Hillary Clinton. The New York State board of elections decided the former Secretary of State would get the ballot line.

Total popular vote: 32,307 (0.5%)

==== American Independent Party nomination in California ====
The state committee ignored the result of its primary and designated Trump as its nominee. This decision was reached at its convention in Sacramento, California, on August 13, 2016.

California did not record a separate ballot total for the AIP.

Party nomination contest

Below are the results of the California Primary ballot, which was rendered superfluous when the state committee decided to select Donald Trump.

California American Independent presidential primary, June 7, 2016
Candidate	Votes	Percentage
Alan Spears	7,348	19%
Arthur Harris	6,510	17%
Robert Ornelas	6,411	17%
J. R. Myers	4,898	13%
Wiley Drake	4,828	13%
James Hedges	3,989	11%
Thomas Hoefling	3,917	10%
Total	37,901	100%

=== No ballot access ===
According to the Federal Election Commission almost 2,000 people, both real and fictional, were registered as 2016 presidential candidates.

Among the more notable ones are:

Name	Prior positions	State	Announced candidacy	
Zoltan Istvan	Futurist, writer, transhumanist philosopher	California	October 2014	He had write-in access in New York and in Florida, where he received 76 and 19 votes respectively, for a total of 95 votes.
Dan Bilzerian	Professional poker player, internet celebrity	California	June 2015	Withdrew in December 2015 and endorsed Donald Trump.
Ken Fields	Entrepreneur, environmental advocate	New York	November 2015	campaign last heard of in August.
Terry Jones	Pastor for Dove World Outreach Center	Florida	July 2013	
Lucy Lou	Mayor of Rabbit Hash, Kentucky	Kentucky	November 2015	
Merlin Miller	Filmmaker	Tennessee	July 2015	

=== Write-in candidates ===
A minimum of 1,022,439 (0.8%) voters cast write-in ballots, what is believed to be a record. Many were for registered candidates who were on the ballot in one or more states, others for candidates who were registered but were on no ballots and others were for fictional or perceptibly humorous figures, like of Mickey Mouse or Buffy the Vampire Slayer. The vast majority of these will never be counted or recorded as individuals but as "Others" or "Scattered." Many states disallow write-in candidacies.

=== Previously speculated ===
The following individuals were the focus of presidential speculation as an independent candidate in multiple media reports during the 2016 election cycle.

- Lawrence Lessig, Professor of Law at Harvard Law School (previously sought Democratic Party presidential nomination)

=== Withdrew ===
- Waka Flocka Flame, rap artist from Georgia
- John McAfee, anti-virus software businessman (originally declared as third-party candidate under named 'Cyber Party', before seeking Libertarian Party nomination)
- Ted Williams, voice actor from Ohio

=== Declined ===
Individuals listed in this section were the focus of media speculation as being possible 2016 presidential candidates but unequivocally ruled out an independent presidential bid in 2016.

- Michael Bloomberg, Mayor of New York City 2002–2013
- David A. French, writer for National Review
- Jon Huntsman Jr., United States Ambassador to China 2009–2011; Governor of Utah 2005–2009; presidential candidate in 2012
- John Kasich, Governor of Ohio since 2011, presidential candidate in 2000, U.S. Representative from Ohio 1983–2001, Member of the Ohio Senate from the 15th district 1979-1983 (eventually received a faithless electoral vote in Texas)
- Dennis Michael Lynch, businessman, documentary film maker and conservative commentator from New York (formed an exploratory committee for a potential bid as an independent before electing to instead explore a potential bid for the Republican nomination)
- Bernie Sanders, U.S. Senator from Vermont since 2007; U.S. Representative from Vermont 1991–2007 (expressed interest in a possible independent presidential bid before declaring his candidacy for the Democratic Party nomination) He was registered as a write-in candidate in Vermont and California without his authorization.
- Jesse Ventura, Governor of Minnesota 1999–2003, Mayor of Brooklyn Park, Minnesota 1991–1995 (publicly expressed interest in a Libertarian Party candidacy instead, before declining to run altogether)
- Jim Webb, U.S. Senator from Virginia 2007–2013 (campaign)

== Debates ==
Free & Equal hosted an open debate along with Student Voices Count at the University of Colorado Boulder's Macky Auditorium on October 25, 2016. Originally, all presidential candidates with ballot access sufficient to represent a majority of electoral votes were invited. in October 2016, Free and Equal extended the invitation to all candidates with ballot lines representing at least fifteen percent of potential voters: the Democratic, Republican, Libertarian, Green, Constitution, Reform, and Socialism and Liberation parties, as well as independent candidate Evan McMullin. Gary Johnson, who participated in the 2012 debate, had already publicly declined in July 2016 to debate Jill Stein on The Young Turks because of a matter of "just time".

Free & Equal debates, 2016
N°	Date	Host	Location	Moderators	Invited participants							
P Participant. A Absent invitee.					Republican	Democratic	Libertarian	Green	Constitution	Reform	PSL	Independent
P Participant. A Absent invitee.					Businessman Donald Trump of New York	Secretary Hillary Clinton of New York	Governor Gary Johnson of New Mexico	Doctor Jill Stein of Massachusetts	Lieutenant Darrell Castle of Tennessee	Businessman Rocky De La Fuente of California	Activist Gloria La Riva of California	Director Evan McMullin of Utah
1	October 25, 2016	University of Colorado Boulder	Boulder, Colorado	Ed Asner	A	A	A	A	P	P	P	A

== See also ==
- 2016 Democratic Party presidential candidates
- 2016 Republican Party presidential candidates
- 2016 United States presidential election timeline
