= A Call for American Renewal =

2021 American political manifesto

A Call for American Renewal is an American political manifesto released on May 13, 2021, by 150 members and former members of the Republican Party. It calls for strengthening the rule of law and increasing government ethics. The manifesto was released one day after the ousting of Representative Liz Cheney as chair of the House Republican Conference, and was largely seen as a reaction against the influence of Trumpism within the Republican Party. The effort was organized by Evan McMullin and Miles Taylor.

== Prominent signatories ==
The manifesto was initially signed onto by 150 members and former members of the Republican Party.

=== Former executive branch officials ===
- Eliot A. Cohen, former counselor of the United States Department of State
- John Mitnick, former general counsel of the United States Department of Homeland Security
- Connie Morella, former United States Ambassador to the Organisation for Economic Co-operation and Development and U.S. representative for Maryland's 8th congressional district
- Elizabeth Neumann, former Homeland Security official
- Tom Ridge, 1st United States Secretary of Homeland Security and 43rd governor of Pennsylvania
- Anthony Scaramucci, former White House communications director
- Miles Taylor, former chief of staff to the United States Secretary of Homeland Security
- Olivia Troye, former homeland security and counter-terrorism advisor to Vice President Pence and aide to the White House Coronavirus Task Force in the Trump administration
- Christine Todd Whitman, 9th administrator of the Environmental Protection Agency and 50th governor of New Jersey
- Dov S. Zakheim, former comptroller of the Department of Defense
- John Negroponte, former United States Deputy Secretary of State, 1st Director of National Intelligence and U.S. Ambassador
- Stuart M. Gerson, acting United States Attorney General and former United States Assistant Attorney General for the Civil Division
- Mary E. Peters, 15th United States Secretary of Transportation and Administrator of the Federal Highway Administration
- Mark Weatherford, 1st deputy under secretary for cybersecurity at the United States Department of Homeland Security
- John B. Bellinger III, former Legal Adviser of the Department of State and the National Security Council

=== Former United States senators ===
- David Durenberger, U.S. senator from Minnesota

=== Former United States representatives ===
- Barbara Comstock, U.S. representative for Virginia's 10th congressional district
- Charlie Dent, U.S. representative for Pennsylvania's 15th congressional district
- Charles Djou, U.S. representative for Hawaii's 1st congressional district
- Wayne Gilchrest, U.S. representative for Maryland's 1st congressional district
- Bob Inglis, U.S. representative for South Carolina's 4th congressional district
- Jim Leach, U.S. representative for Iowa's 2nd congressional district
- Paul Mitchell, U.S. representative for Michigan's 10th congressional district
- Reid Ribble, U.S. representative for Wisconsin's 8th congressional district
- Denver Riggleman, U.S. representative for Virginia's 5th congressional district (Independent)
- Claudine Schneider, U.S. representative for Rhode Island's 2nd congressional district
- Joe Walsh, U.S. representative for Illinois's 8th congressional district (Independent)
- Dick Zimmer, U.S. representative for New Jersey's 12th congressional district
- Scott Rigell, U.S. representative for Virginia's 2nd congressional district
- John LeBoutillier, U.S. representative for New York's 6th congressional district
- Rick Lazio, U.S. representative for New York's 2nd congressional district
- Tom Coleman, U.S. representative for Missouri's 6th congressional district
- Tom Petri, U.S. representative for Wisconsin's 6th congressional district
- Steve Bartlett, 56th mayor of Dallas and U.S. Representative for Texas's 3rd congressional district
- Rod Chandler, U.S. representative for Washington's 8th congressional district
- Peter Plympton Smith, U.S. representative for Vermont's at-large congressional district
- Pete McCloskey, U.S. representative for California's 11th congressional district, California's 17th congressional district then California's 12th congressional district (Democratic)
- Mickey Edwards, U.S. representative for Oklahoma's 5th congressional district (Independent)

=== Former state officials ===
- Arne Carlson, 37th governor of Minnesota
- Mark Sanford, 115th governor of South Carolina
- Bill Weld, 68th governor of Massachusetts
- Robert F. Orr, Associate Justice of the North Carolina Supreme Court (Independent)

=== State legislators ===
- Davy Carter, Speaker of the Arkansas House of Representatives
- Bruce Maloch, Arkansas State Senator from the 12th district and Arkansas State Representative from the 4th district
- Chad Mayes, Minority Leader of the California State Assembly and member of the California State Assembly from the 42nd district (Independent)
- Cole Wist, Colorado State Representative from the 37th district
- Bob Worsley, Arizona state senator from 25th district
- Charles Jeter, North Carolina House of Representatives from the 92nd district
- Chris Vance, former chair of the Washington Republican Party, King County Council from the 13th district and Washington state representative from the 31st district (Independent)
- Nate Bell, Arkansas State Representative from the 20th and 22nd district (Independent)
- Michelle Udall, Arizona State Representative from the 25th district
- Marty Linsky, Massachusetts State Representative from the 13th Norfolk District

=== Political activists ===
- Chris Bayley, former King County Prosecuting Attorney
- George Conway, co-founder of the Lincoln Project and husband of Kellyanne Conway (Independent)
- Evan McMullin, political activist and former CIA operations officer (Independent)
- Gabriel Schoenfeld, author, editor, political advisor, commentator and senior adviser to Mitt Romney for presidential campaign
- Michael Steele, chairman of the Republican National Committee, 7th lieutenant governor of Maryland and chairman of the Maryland Republican Party
- Bob Yudin, former chairman of the Bergen County, New Jersey Republican Party
- Richard Painter, former chief White House ethics lawyer in the George W. Bush administration (Democratic since 2018)
- Neal Simon, business executive and community leader (Independent)
- William F. B. O'Reilly, opinion columnist and political consultant
- Trevor Potter, former commissioner and chairman of the Federal Election Commission
- Tara Setmayer, CNN political Commentator, contributor to ABC News and former Republican communications director (Independent)
- Theodore Roosevelt IV, managing director at Barclays Capital Corporation and great-grandson of Theodore Roosevelt
- T. Greg Doucette, lawyer
- Susan Del Percio, political consultant
- Sophia A. Nelson, author and journalist (Independent)
- Mona Charen, columnist, journalist and political commentator
- Mindy Finn, digital strategist for the Republican Party (Independent)
- Max Boot, author
- John Kingston III, investor

== See also ==
- Forward Party (United States)
- Never Trump movement
- Republican Political Alliance for Integrity and Reform
