= Evan McMullin 2016 presidential campaign =

Political campaign for United States presidency

Evan McMullin for President
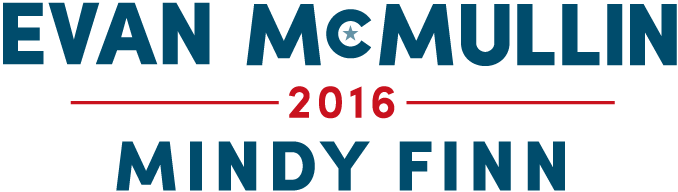
- Campaign: 2016 presidential election
- Candidate: Evan McMullin; Former chief policy director for the House Republican Conference; Mindy Finn (Note: Mindy Finn did not appear on the ballot with Evan McMullin. Instead Nathan Daniel Johnson appeared alongside McMullin on all eleven states.); Businesswoman, political consultant
- Affiliation: Independent; Better for America
- Status: Announced: August 8, 2016; Lost election: November 8, 2016
- Headquarters: 770 E South Temple; Salt Lake City, Utah 84102
- Key people: Joel Searby (campaign manager)
- Receipts: US$1,644,102.20

Website
- http://evanmcmullin.com/

The 2016 presidential campaign of Evan McMullin was launched on August 10, 2016. McMullin ran as an independent presidential candidate, but also received the presidential nominations of Better for America, Independence Party of Minnesota, Independent Party of Florida, and South Carolina Independence Party.

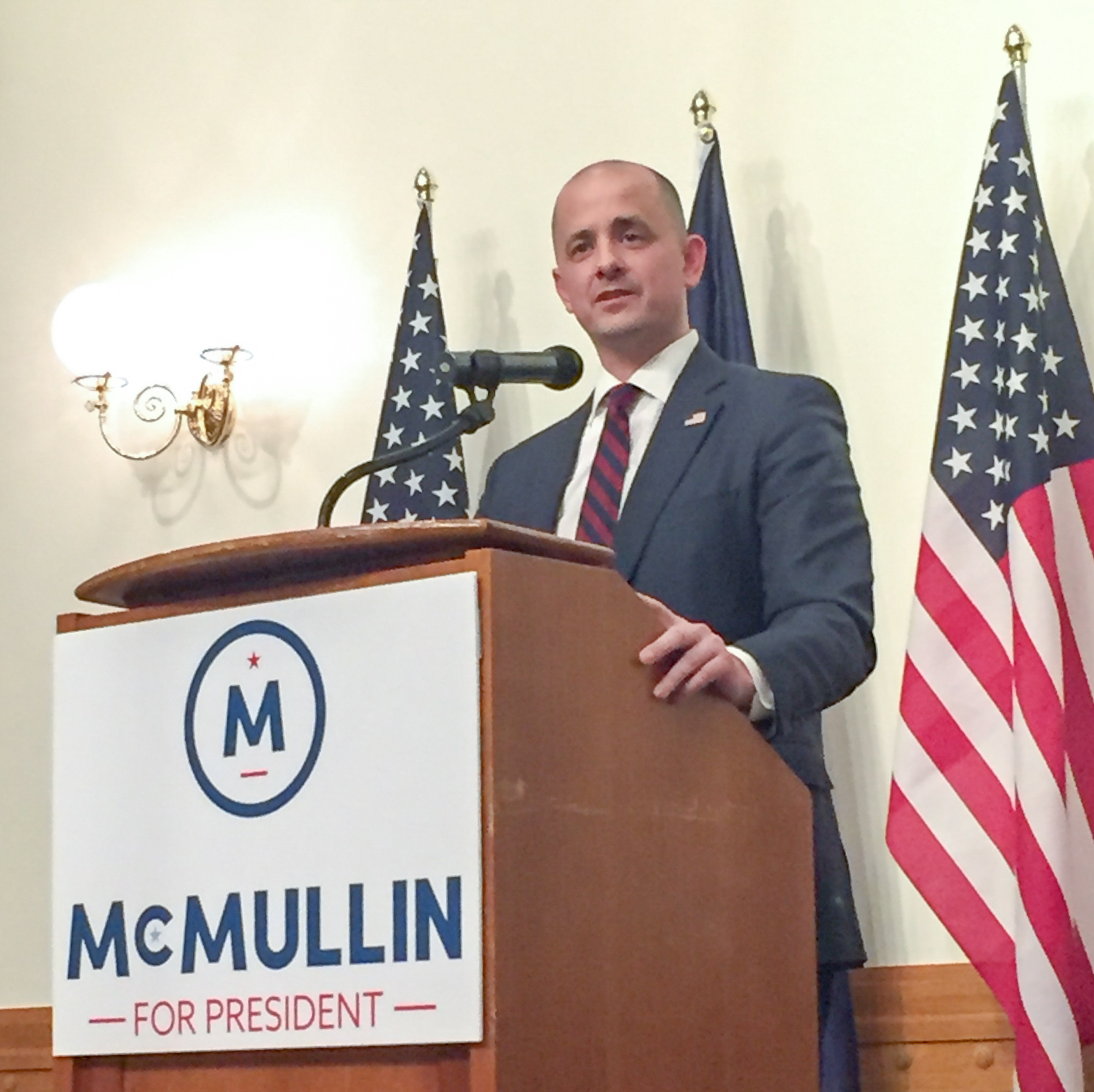
McMullin campaigning in Provo

== Background ==
The controversial candidacy of Donald Trump for the Republican Party nomination caused the creation of the Stop Trump movement, which sought to stop his nomination or find a candidate to oppose him. After months of unsuccessful searching, Evan McMullin decided to run as a conservative alternative candidate based on Trump's divisive comments on a variety of issues, calling him a potential threat to the Republic.

== Campaign ==
On August 10, 2016, Evan McMullin, the former chief policy director for the House Republican Conference and a former CIA operations officer, announced that he would run for the presidency of the United States as an independent. Kahlil Byrd, who served as the CEO of Americans Elect, formed a SuperPAC to support McMullin's candidacy.

McMullin received support from multiple anti-Trump Republicans including former Washington Senator Slade Gorton, former Secretary of State of Washington Sam Reed, and former Utah Lieutenant Governor Greg Bell.

On October 6, McMullin selected Mindy Finn, who had supported Marco Rubio during the Republican presidential primaries, to serve as his vice-presidential running mate. Although McMullin had selected Mindy Finn to serve as his vice-presidential running mate she did not appear on the ballot in any states. Instead Nathan Daniel Johnson, who was originally intended to serve as a placeholder candidate, appeared on the ballot alongside McMullin.

Evan McMullin's objective in the 2016 presidential election was to win his home state of Utah and prevent either candidate from reaching 270 electoral votes. Hillary Clinton (268) Donald Trump (263) Evan McMullin (6)

While McMullin was not on enough state ballots to win an outright majority in the Electoral College (barring carrying other states by write-in), opinion polls suggested that he was the most likely third-party candidate to carry a state. Had he won his home state of Utah, he could theoretically have prevented any candidate from amassing the 270 votes necessary to win the presidency. In that event, the United States House of Representatives would meet to elect the President, and would be bound to choose from the top three presidential candidates in terms of electoral votes. Barring another third-party candidate taking more electoral votes or an organized bloc of faithless electors larger than McMullin's choosing another candidate, the House would presumably have been bound to choose between Clinton, Trump and McMullin. Although Trump ultimately won a majority in the Electoral College, had Clinton flipped his two most marginal states of Michigan and Pennsylvania, then a McMullin victory in Utah would have delivered this outcome.

=== Ballot access ===
Evan McMullin ballot access in the 2016 presidential election On ballot Write-in access No ballot access

Although the filing deadline to get onto the ballot had passed in multiple states by the time McMullin announced his campaign he stated that he hoped he could appear on the ballot in all fifty states. He submitted around 2,000 signatures in Utah and 1,083 were validated, more than the 1,000 required. McMullin failed to appear on the ballot in Tennessee as he only collected 129 of the 275 signatures required. He failed to appear on the ballot in Wyoming after submitting 5,500 signatures, but less than the 3,302 signatures required was validated.

McMullin threatened to sue Texas over its May petition deadline, but did not. Texas election officials initially sent a letter to McMullin telling him that he was not certified as a write-in candidate, but the Secretary of State of Texas later reversed his decision and allowed McMullin as a write-in candidate.

Better for America successfully petitioned for the purpose of the presidential election in Arkansas and received official party status in New Mexico. On August 22, Better for America announced that it would end its ballot access petitioning and later selected to give its presidential nomination to McMullin and vice-presidential nomination to Nathan Johnson on August 24.

The Independence Party of Minnesota selected to give its presidential nomination to McMullin and petitioned to appear on the ballot as "Independence". McMullin was given the presidential nomination of the ballot qualified Independent Party of Florida, but the Secretary of State of Florida refused to place him onto the ballot on the grounds that the party wasn't recognized by the Federal Election Commission or affiliated with a national party. He also received the presidential nomination of the Independence Party of South Carolina. McMullin filed in Louisiana under the party label "Courage Character Service".

Ballot access: a combined total of 84 electoral votes in these states: Arkansas, Colorado, Idaho, Iowa, Kentucky, Louisiana, Minnesota, New Mexico, South Carolina, Utah, Virginia

Write-in: a combined total of 366 electoral votes in these states: Alabama, Alaska, Arizona, California, Delaware, Georgia, Illinois, Kansas, Maine, Maryland, Massachusetts, Missouri, Michigan, Montana, Nebraska, New Hampshire, New Jersey, New York, North Dakota, Ohio, Oregon, Pennsylvania, Rhode Island, Tennessee, Texas, Vermont, Washington, Washington, D.C., West Virginia, Wisconsin, Wyoming

== Results ==
This map shows the percentage of the popular vote Evan McMullin earned in each county.

McMullin received no votes from the Electoral College. In the national popular vote count he placed fifth with 732,273 votes (0.53%). Of the votes McMullin received, 510,002 votes came from states he appeared on the ballot in while he received 221,267 write-in votes. He broke write-in vote records in Arizona, Delaware, Illinois, Kansas, Maine, Maryland, Michigan, Missouri, Montana, Ohio, Pennsylvania, Tennessee, Texas, and Wisconsin.

McMullin received votes from at least three sitting United States Senators: Jeff Flake, Lindsey Graham, and Mike Lee.

== Polling ==
In late August 2016, polling nationwide and in most states placed McMullin in the 1–2% range. Late October polls in Idaho showed McMullin with about 10% of the vote, while during the same period in Utah polls showed him with between 20% and 30% of the vote.

== See also ==
- Never Trump movement
- Stand Up Republic
- 2016 United States presidential election in Utah
