= Evan McMullin =

American political candidate (born 1976)

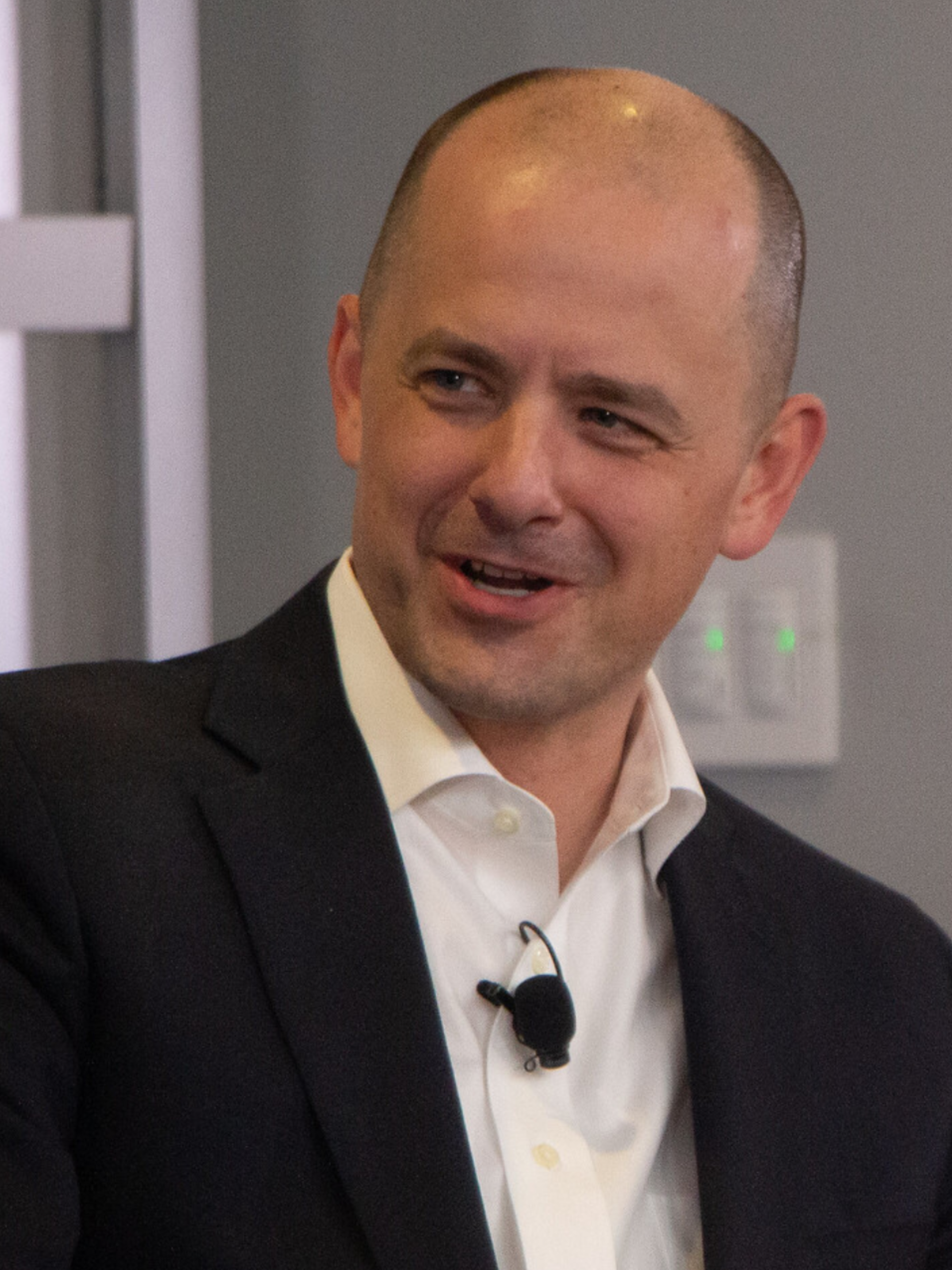
- McMullin in 2019
- Born: David Evan McMullin; April 2, 1976 (age 50); Provo, Utah, U.S.
- Education: Brigham Young University (BA); University of Pennsylvania (MBA)
- Political party: Republican (before 2016); Independent (2016–present)
- Spouse: Emily Norton (m. 2021)

David Evan McMullin (born April 2, 1976) is an American politician and former Central Intelligence Agency (CIA) officer. McMullin ran as an independent in the 2016 United States presidential election and in the 2022 United States Senate election in Utah.

McMullin was a CIA operations officer from 2001 to 2010. In 2011, he received an MBA from the University of Pennsylvania and worked as an investment banker for about a year and a half. He was a senior adviser on national security issues for the House Committee on Foreign Affairs from 2013 to 2015 and served as a chief policy director for the House Republican Conference in the U.S. House of Representatives from January 2015 through July 2016. McMullin left the Republican Party in 2016 after Donald Trump became the party's presumptive presidential nominee.

McMullin ran for president in the 2016 election as an independent backed by the organization Better for America. He received support from some members of the "Never Trump" movement, and polling taken late in the campaign showed him ahead of major party nominees Donald Trump and Hillary Clinton in his home state of Utah. McMullin received 21.5% of the vote in Utah, taking third place in the state behind Trump and Clinton. Nationally, he received 0.5% of the popular vote.

Following his defeat, McMullin emerged as a vocal critic of the Trump administration. He endorsed Joe Biden in the 2020 U.S. presidential election. He has been involved in early discussions about forming a new center-right political party, and organized the May 2021 release of the political manifesto "A Call for American Renewal" with Miles Taylor. In 2022, McMullin launched a campaign as an independent in the U.S. Senate election in Utah, receiving the endorsement of the Utah Democratic Party. He was defeated in the November 8 general election by incumbent Republican Mike Lee, losing by a margin of ten percent in the closest Senate election in Utah since 1976.

== Early life and education ==
McMullin was born on April 2, 1976 in Provo, Utah, the oldest of four children of David McMullin and Lanie Bullard. At a young age, his family moved to a rural area outside Seattle, Washington, where his father worked as a computer scientist and his mother sold bulk foods to neighbors from the family's garage. After graduating in 1994 from Auburn Senior High School, McMullin spent two years in Brazil as a missionary for The Church of Jesus Christ of Latter-day Saints (LDS Church). Upon returning, he spent a summer working on an Alaskan fishing vessel.

In 1997, McMullin began attending Brigham Young University (BYU); every year he was in college he did a summer internship with the CIA. He spent a year living in Israel and Jordan and volunteered as a refugee resettlement officer for the United Nations High Commissioner for Refugees. In 2001, McMullin graduated with a bachelor's degree in international law and diplomacy and began formal training with the CIA to become an operations officer. After working for the CIA, McMullin attended the Wharton School at the University of Pennsylvania where he received an MBA in 2011.

== Career ==
=== CIA intelligence officer ===
Soon after McMullin joined the CIA, the September 11 attacks occurred, leading to an accelerated training and deployment. He spent the next decade working overseas on counterterrorism and intelligence operations as an operations officer with the National Clandestine Service, operating in the Middle East, North Africa, and South Asia. He was first deployed in 2003 and left the agency in 2010. His deployments included postings in an unspecified southwest Asian country that was key to the-ongoing war on terror.

While the details of his missions remain classified, former CIA officers who worked with McMullin praised his work, noting his talent for recruiting members of extremist organizations through building trust and willingness to engage in human intelligence outside the confines of the embassy. His former supervisor said that U.S. intelligence goals at that time included information-gathering for efforts against the Taliban, developing intelligence for counter-terrorism strikes, and searching for information leading to Osama bin Laden and other al-Qaeda leaders. Near the end of his CIA career, he worked undercover in Iraq. McMullin said his work involved meeting with business and government leaders, as well as collecting information from terrorist operatives.

=== Career in business and as House staffer ===
After leaving the CIA, McMullin attended the Wharton School at the University of Pennsylvania, earning his MBA in 2011. McMullin then worked for the Investment Banking Division at Goldman Sachs for about a year and a half. In 2012, he volunteered for Mitt Romney's presidential campaign, which indirectly led to him being recruited by Republicans on the House Committee on Foreign Affairs looking for an adviser with counter-terrorism experience. In 2013, McMullin was an International Advisory Board member for the Kennedy Center for International Studies at BYU.

In 2013, McMullin became a senior adviser on national security issues for the House Committee on Foreign Affairs for the 113th Congress. In 2015, McMullin became the chief policy director of the House Republican Conference under Chairwoman Cathy McMorris Rodgers (R-Wash.). It was from this position that he watched the 2016 Republican primaries, and when he began to speak out against Trump he was urged by some Republicans to stay out of the fray. McMullin resigned as chief policy director shortly before declaring his run for the presidency in August 2016.

== Political activity ==
=== 2016 presidential campaign ===
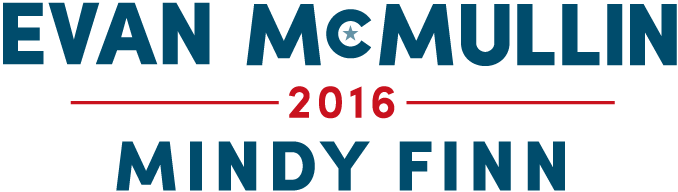
McMullin's campaign logo

Ballot access in the election
On ballot
Write-in
No ballot access

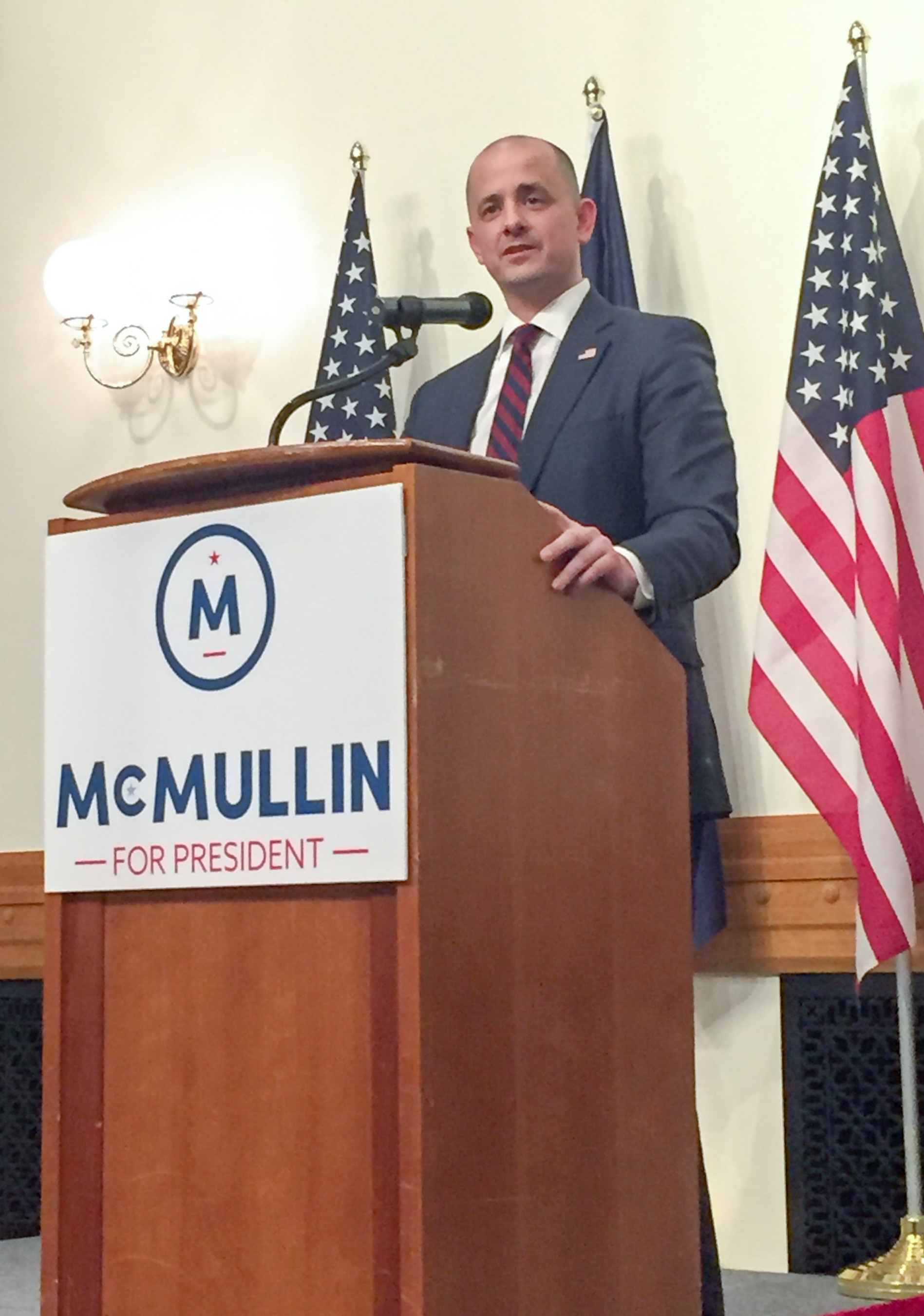
McMullin campaigning for president in Provo.

On August 8, 2016, McMullin announced that he would run as a candidate for President of the United States in the 2016 presidential election as an independent. He had personally lobbied several Congresspeople to run under the Better for America banner, but when none would run and it was suggested to him that he should run himself, he decided to do so. McMullin ran as an independent conservative alternative to Trump, and had the support of several anti-Trump Republican donors, and his presidential bid was also backed by several former members of Better for America, a 501(c)(4) organization dedicated to getting nationwide ballot access for an independent candidate for president in the 2016 election. McMullin's campaign was supported by some members of the "Never Trump" movement.

In September 2016, McMullin said Trump "poses a true threat to our national security by carrying Putin's water in the United States" and criticized Russian government activities to promote Trump and his allies, saying that these activities undermined the U.S. and global economies and were destructive to peace and security. He criticized Russian disinformation campaigns that targeted Western Europe and North America "through fomenting discord between different racial groups, different ethnic groups, and different religious groups." He criticized Republican congresspeople who publicly supported Trump while privately expressing alarm at Trump's actions and statements, saying that many Republican officials were "afraid to speak out against" Trump for fear of losing their seats, and said: "Anyone who supports Donald Trump is someone who I think is not too committed to the constitution. I believe Donald Trump poses a true threat to our constitution and those who support him are sustaining that threat." In a December 2016 rally, Trump attacked McMullin, referring to him as "McMuffin" and saying, "I never even heard of this guy before. Nobody did."

McMullin's late entrance into the race caused him to miss several state ballot deadlines, and ultimately he was only able to appear on the ballot in eleven states, with write-in eligibility in many other states. As such he did not appear on enough ballots to win the necessary Electoral College majority of 270 electoral votes, so instead McMullin hoped to deny a majority of the electoral vote to either of the two major-party candidates. In such a scenario, under the terms of the Twelfth Amendment, the House of Representatives would select the new president from among the top-three electoral vote winners.

The same day that McMullin launched his independent bid, Kahlil Byrd and Chris Ashby, Republican strategists with expertise in third-party ballot access, announced the formation of a super PAC called Stand Up America to support McMullin's campaign via TV and digital ads, events, and organizing. On October 6, McMullin named Mindy Finn as his running mate. Finn had previously worked for Twitter and as a digital strategist for the RNC and the National Republican Senatorial Committee. Because Finn's selection came after the ballot paperwork deadlines, Finn did not appear on any of the state ballots. Instead, McMullin's friend's name, Nathan Johnson, was submitted as a placeholder.

McMullin's support surged in Utah in October after the release of a 2005 audio recording in which Donald Trump was heard bragging in lewd terms about making sexual advances on women. McMullin's popularity in Utah – and Trump's unpopularity – appears owing to an unusual shift of Mormons away from the Republican candidate. Prognosticators gave McMullin a 3–10% chance of winning the state. Had McMullin won Utah, it would have been the first time since 1968 that a non-major-party candidate won a state.

Ultimately, McMullin's best performance came in Utah, his native state, where he came in third place, receiving 21.5% of the state's popular vote, behind both Donald Trump (who received 45.5% and the state's six electoral votes) and Hillary Clinton (who received 27.5%). He also took third in Idaho with 6.7%. Nationwide, McMullin received 734,737 votes (0.5%), (0.7%) in the states he was on the ballot. After the election, McMullin said that "the fight would continue" for a "new conservative movement" reaching out to "non-traditional conservative voters ... who feel disaffected". It might, he said, form a new political party. While running for president in 2016, McMullin's campaign amassed about $664,000 in debt to campaign vendors, mostly from legal fees. It is common for unsuccessful presidential campaigns to incur such debts, and McMullin said in 2022 that he was committed to paying down the debts. Utah businessman and former Republican Kimball Parker Dean wrote that McMullin's 2022 Senate campaign raised the possibility that he could use the funds he raises to pay those debts.

=== After the 2016 campaign through 2021 ===
After the 2016 campaign, McMullin remained strongly critical of Trump and Putin. In a December 2016 op-ed, McMullin attacked Trump as a threat to American constitutional government, saying that the president-elect's actions were "consistent with the authoritarian playbook" and "undermined critical democratic norms including peaceful debate and transitions of power, commitment to truth, freedom from foreign interference and abstention from the use of executive power for political retribution".

In January 2017, McMullin and his former running mate Finn announced the establishment of a 501(c)(4) organization, Stand Up Republic. The group, a nonpartisan organization, was formed as a watchdog group criticizing Trump administration on democracy issues. The group focuses on "defense of democratic (small 'd') norms, constitutionalism and civic involvement". Speaking on so-called "alternative facts" McMullin said: "Undermining truth is a typical authoritarian tactic. It is incredibly dangerous ... We never thought we'd be talking about this in America." In a February 2017 op-ed, McMullin wrote, "President Trump's disturbing Russian connections present an acute danger to American national security." He called upon congressional Republicans to "recommit to patriotic prudence" and "demand that Attorney General Jeff Sessions appoint an independent special counsel to investigate Russia's assault on American democracy and Mr. Trump's possible collusion with the Kremlin".

In 2020, McMullin endorsed Joe Biden over Trump in the 2020 presidential election, writing that "We now face a choice between the road to freedom and the road to tyranny. ... I'll put country over party in November." He was involved in early discussions with dozens of former Republican officials about forming a new center-right political party, and organized the May 2021 release of the political manifesto "A Call for American Renewal" with Miles Taylor.

=== 2022 U.S. Senate campaign ===
On October 5, 2021, McMullin launched an independent campaign to unseat U.S. Senator Mike Lee in the 2022 election. He announced his candidacy in the Deseret News, writing, "We do not need the extremists, the dividers, or the self-serving opportunists who haunt the halls of Congress today. We need selfless, servant leaders who unite rather than divide, seek solutions rather than attention, and who will consistently put the interests of Utahns and our country first. That's why I'm running to replace Sen. Mike Lee and to represent Utah, and our values, in the United States Senate." McMullin named "our unmooring from truth" as the greatest threat to America, specifically condemning conspiracism, misinformation, and divisiveness as threats to American democracy.

Two high-profile Utah Democratic officials, former Representative Ben McAdams and Salt Lake County Mayor Jenny Wilson, endorsed McMullin by March 2022. In April 2022, both the Utah chapter of the American Solidarity Party and the Utah Democratic Party decided to endorse McMullin's independent candidacy for Senate, rather than field candidates of their own. McMullin pledged, if elected, to caucus with neither the Democrats nor the Republicans. Utah's other U.S. Senator, Mitt Romney, stayed neutral in the race. Lee was favored to win the race, as most (but not all) polls showed Lee with a single-digit lead over McMullin; the race was viewed as unusually competitive for Utah, which is typically a deeply Republican state. McMullin lost the election to Lee 53.2–42.8% but had the best performance by a non-Republican since 1976. Lee's vote share was down 15 points from his 68.2% six years prior.

== Political positions ==
McMullin has spoken out against partisanship and extremism in politics, stating that those extremes do not accurately represent Utah or the country as a whole, and has embraced being an independent. He has said that extremism is jeopardizing American government.

=== Economic issues ===
McMullin supports free trade, pointing to the economic benefits of international trade. He supported NAFTA of 1994 and the original Trans-Pacific Partnership. McMullin supports a reduction in the corporate income tax and individual income tax, as well as the estate tax. McMullin favors cuts to entitlement programs such as Social Security, and has proposed means-testing the program and raising the retirement age.

=== Environmental issues ===
McMullin accepts the scientific consensus on climate change, saying: "I do believe that the climate is changing, and I do believe that human activity is contributing to it. If I were president, I would increase investment in technologies that can help us limit and decrease our carbon emissions."

=== Foreign and national security policy ===
On the Syrian Civil War, McMullin described himself as a "vocal advocate for international action that would stop Assad's slaughter of innocent Syrians, and eventually set the stage for a negotiated departure from the country". McMullin also has said: "We should have done more to support the moderate Syrian opposition, and we still need to do that. They haven't received sufficient support or training, and we know how to do that very well." In 2016, McMullin expressed support for imposing a no-fly zone over Syria "to stop the aerial bombardment of Syrian population centers".

McMullin opposes the use of torture, while supporting keeping the Guantanamo Bay detention camp open. McMullin has harshly criticized the international nuclear agreement with Iran. He stated: "We've got to certainly enforce the deal as it is, but I believe in strengthening sanctions on Iran to force them to make further concessions. I also believe in putting the military option clearly back on the table if Iran decides to not keep its end of the deal and if it ultimately decides to pursue nuclear weapons."

McMullin told ABC News that he believed Donald Trump's public comments were frustrating U.S. counterterrorism efforts. "What he doesn't realize is that we actually depend on Muslims to do counterterrorism, to wage war against terrorists." Trump's remarks concerning Muslims "decreases their willingness to work with us, with other Muslims, and that impedes our ability to destroy ISIS". McMullin also criticized Trump's "allegiance to [Russian President] Vladimir Putin" and accused Putin of engaging in a campaign to destabilize European and North American countries "through fomenting discord between different racial groups, different ethnic groups, and different religious groups".

In 2014, McMullin helped to bring Caesar, a defected Syrian military photographer who leaked 55,000 images depicting abuses by the regime (which formed the basis for the 2014 Syrian detainee report), to speak before the House Foreign Affairs Committee, according to The Christian Science Monitor. McMullin clashed with State Department officials he suspected were holding up the hearing. McMullin claimed that State Department officials wanted to have a closed hearing.

=== Social issues ===
McMullin supported overturning Roe v. Wade in 2016. After the U.S. Supreme Court overturned Roe in the Dobbs v. Jackson Women's Health Organization, McMullin issued a statement saying, "I believe the never-ending conflict over abortion laws threatens a public health crisis and further divide the country on an issue where there is common ground." He described himself as "pro-life" and said that he "opposed politicians at the extremes of both parties on the issue, those who would ban all abortions without exceptions and those who oppose all restrictions." McMullin said that states should be largely responsible for setting abortion policy and supported Utah's abortion trigger law as "a good starting place". He criticized "extreme" state laws enacted after Dobbs, including bans on all abortions, and said that the federal government should act to block laws that ban abortions for victims of rape, ban residents from traveling to obtain an abortion, and ban contraceptives. McMullin added, "When we do more to help women and children, abortions decline. Making contraceptives more available and otherwise doing much more to support families is what truly protects life." The statement echoed McMullin's past calls for more policies that support women, children, and families. McMullin said that, if elected, he would vote against bills to ban abortion nationwide. In previous statements, McMullin said there was common ground between Americans who support and oppose abortion rights, criticized the divisive "never-ending tug-of-war" of the abortion debate, and noted that the number of U.S. abortions has been declining for years.

On same-sex marriage, McMullin said that he believes in "traditional marriage between a man and a woman" but he "respects" the Supreme Court's decision in Obergefell v. Hodges (which found that same-sex couples have a constitutional right to marry) and thinks it is "time to move on" from the issue. McMullin's mother is in a same-sex marriage, having married another woman after separating from his father, and McMullin has said, "As far as my mother's marriage is concerned, I believe in the sanctity of traditional marriage. It is an important part of my faith. My mother has a different view. That is OK. I love her very much."

=== Other domestic issues ===
During his 2016 presidential campaign, McMullin said that if elected, he would appoint originalist judges to the Supreme Court, "in the mold of Antonin Scalia and Clarence Thomas". On immigration, McMullin supports border security but not mass deportation. He criticized immigration policy based on family reunification, taking the position that U.S. economic policy should be based on serving the nation's economic interests by attracting the talented. In 2016, McMullin expressed support for the provision of the Patient Protection and Affordable Care Act that blocks health insurance companies from denying coverage or discriminating against people with preexisting conditions. He also stated, "we also need to do better than ObamaCare." McMullin has also supported allowing Medicare to negotiate prices for prescription drugs.

== Personal life ==
McMullin is a member of The Church of Jesus Christ of Latter-day Saints. In June 2021, McMullin married Emily Norton. He has five stepchildren from his wife's previous marriage (her first husband died of brain cancer in 2016). The family lives in Highland, Utah.

Party political offices
Preceded by Misty Snow	Democratic nominee for U.S. Senator from Utah (Class 3); Endorsed; 2022	Most recent
