= Americans Elect =

Political and social welfare organization (2010–2014)

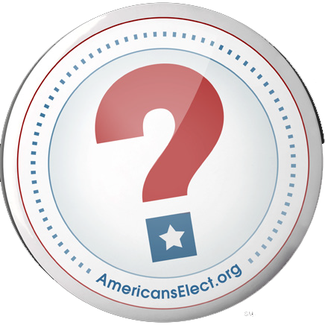
- Founded: April 6, 2010; 16 years ago
- Founder: Peter Ackerman (Chairman)
- Dissolved: 2014
- Type: social welfare organization
- Tax ID no.: 27-2285014
- Location: 1901 Penn Avenue, NW, Suite 1000, Washington, DC 20006
- Coordinates: 38°54′02″N 77°02′38″W
- Origins: Unity08
- Region served: United States
- Key people: Peter Ackerman (Chairman); Kahlil Byrd (CEO); Douglas Schoen (paid consultant); Mark McKinnon (Advisory Board member); Christine Todd Whitman (Director); Daniel B. Winslow (counsel)
- Revenue: $5,113,010 in 2010
- Endowment: $1,717,857 as of December 31, 2010
- Employees: 100+
- Website: AmericansElect.org (archived - August 4, 2014)

Americans Elect was a political organization in the United States known primarily for its efforts to stage a national online primary for the 2012 United States presidential election. Although it was successful in obtaining signatures to get on the ballot in a majority of states, the process set up by the organization did not select a candidate.

== History ==
Incorporated on April 6, 2010, by Peter Ackerman and Kahlil Byrd, Americans Elect began recruiting delegates for its 2012 Presidential Primary in July 2011. Americans Elect was scheduled to host a national online primary in two phases, ending with a convention in June 2012. The resulting ticket, chosen by Americans Elect users, would have been listed on the ballot nationwide under the Americans Elect line. The organization had an open membership, which allowed any U.S. voter to draft and support his or her candidate of choice. The drafting began on February 1, 2012, and, in the first few hours, the 360,000 delegates began draft efforts for 52 possible candidates including Michael Bloomberg, Warren Buffett, Hillary Clinton, Rahm Emanuel, Jon Huntsman, Ron Paul, Condoleezza Rice, and Buddy Roemer. Americans Elect was open to candidates from any party, as well as independents. Presidential candidates would have been required to choose a vice presidential running mate from a party different from their own to ensure a balanced ticket.

In order to obtain ballot access nationwide, some states' guidelines required Americans Elect to register as a political party. For the 2012 elections, Americans Elect succeeded in ballot access status in 29 states: Alabama, Alaska, Arizona, Arkansas, California, Colorado, Florida, Hawaii, Kansas, Maine, Maryland, Michigan, Mississippi, Montana, Nebraska, Nevada, New Mexico, North Carolina, North Dakota, Ohio, Oklahoma, Oregon, Rhode Island, South Carolina, South Dakota, Utah, Vermont, Wisconsin and Wyoming.

Any U.S. citizen thought to be constitutionally eligible was eligible to be drafted as a candidate. Americans Elect participants, referred to as delegates, could also propose and vote on the Platform of Questions, a list of questions that all candidates would have to answer before the June phase of the primary. Prior to delegate voting, the positions of various potential candidates on the Platform of Questions were inferred, using voting records and public statements compiled by OnTheIssues.org, and posted on the website.

Candidates, whether drafted or self-declared, were required to receive a minimum number of clicks of support from verified delegates to advance to the American Elect online primary ballot. Candidates who had served in any of the following positions, without having been removed from office or under current criminal indictment or conviction, needed 1,000 support clicks from each of ten states to qualify: Vice President, United States Senator, member of Congress, Presidential Cabinet member, head of a Federal agency, governor, mayor of any of the largest 100 cities in the United States, chairman or chief executive officer or president of a corporation, nonprofit corporation, or philanthropic organization with 1,000 or more employees, president of a national labor union with 100,000 or more members, military officer who has attained flag rank, ambassador, or president of an American-based university with 4,000 or more students.

All other candidates required 5,000 support clicks from each of ten states to qualify for the primary ballot.

The first phase of voting was intended to identify the six most popular certified candidates through three rounds of online balloting. The organization announced that it would hold a series of three primary ballots to narrow down its field of candidates on May 8, 15, and 22nd of 2012. The six finalists were expected to advance to the second phase of the primary, after agreeing to the Americans Elect rules and selecting a vice-presidential running mate. Americans Elect planned to choose its final candidate in June 2012 through an Internet-based convention, a process open to all voters, regardless of party affiliation. The intent was to provide a more open nominating process, resulting in better choices during the election.

However, on May 1, 2012, the first primary ballot (which had been scheduled for May 8) was cancelled, because no candidate had garnered sufficient support clicks to qualify for the ballot. Voting was then rescheduled to begin on May 15, 2012. However, with no candidate qualifying for the ballot to be held on that date, the primary was pushed off again. On May 17, the organization announced that it was ending its nomination process because no candidate had achieved the required amount of support to qualify for its primary ballot.

In July 2012, the remaining board members decided to officially end Americans Elect's presidential efforts and withdrew its name from most state ballots.

The Americans Elect website is still accessible but has not been updated since 2012.

Americans Elect made no attempt to revive its process for the 2016 presidential election, despite widespread dissatisfaction with the two major parties and the lack of an incumbent running for reelection. Its founders, through an organization called "Level The Playing Field", focused on efforts to get independent and third-party candidates access to the 2016 general election debates.

== Candidates in 2012 and 2014 ==
In Arizona, several candidates ran under the Americans Elect Party banner in 2012 and 2014. In 2012, Richard Grayson and Stephen Dolgos ran on an Americans Elect ticket in Arizona's 4th and 8th Congressional Districts, respectively.

In 2014, Rebecca DeWitt and Stephen Dolgos ran as Americans Elect candidates in the general election in Arizona's 7th and 8th Congressional Districts, respectively, and John Lewis Mealer was the Americans Elect party candidate for Arizona Governor. In addition, in 2014, Kelly Gneiting ran for the State Senate in Legislative District 7, and Suzie Easter ran for the State House of Representatives in Legislative District 22.

Also in 2014, Alan Reynolds ran for California Lieutenant Governor in California's June 3, 2014 direct primary election as a candidate of the Americans Elect Party. He received 56,027 votes, or 1.3% of the total.

Americans Elect also ran television ads supporting the U.S. Senate campaign of former Maine governor, Angus King.

== People ==
Americans Elect was formed by many of the individuals who were responsible for a previous attempt to nominate an Internet candidate, Unity08, and it had substantially identical goals for the 2012 presidential election cycle. Americans Elect's founder and Chairman was financier Peter Ackerman. Kahlil Byrd was the former CEO; he subsequently became the president of StudentsFirst by January 2013. Other members of the Board of Directors included Eliot Cutler, Dennis Blair, Stephen W. Bosworth, Irvine Hockaday, Christine Todd Whitman, and Joshua S. Levine. The Board of Advisors included notable names such as Greg Orman, Mark McKinnon & John Negroponte, among others.

== Reception and impact ==
Although it had a minor impact on the election, columnist Thomas Friedman initially saw promise in the organization, writing "Americans Elect. What Amazon.com did to books, what the blogosphere did to newspapers, what the iPod did to music, what drugstore.com did to pharmacies, Americans Elect plans to do to the two-party duopoly that has dominated American political life—remove the barriers to real competition, flatten the incumbents and let the people in." Some commentators discussed the possibility of Americans Elect producing a spoiler candidate. Columnist Harold Meyerson predicted that an Americans Elect candidate "could well replicate the signally dubious achievement of Ralph Nader in the 2000 election: Throwing the election to one of the two major-party nominees who otherwise would not have won."

The group was criticized for failure to fully disclose its funding. The group was originally organized as a political organization and at that time tax documents show that Peter Ackerman, father of the Chief Operating Officer Elliot Ackerman, had contributed $1.55 million. In 2011, it changed its designation to a 501(c)4 social welfare group. Americans Elect claimed that none of its funding came from special interests, lobbyists, corporations or other groups. The group changed its bylaws in 2012 to provide that the wealthy donors who had lent the organization its initial funds would be repaid from donations to the organization.

At the conclusion of the campaign, Garrett Quinn of Boston.com wrote, "This $35 million operation was doomed to fail from the beginning. How can you run a serious political organization aimed at winning elections without any kind of guiding ideology or real local organization? You can't. These guys, like so many compassless folks in politics, seriously misread the American electorate and recent third party history. Third parties do not work without a guiding ideology, be it left, right, libertarian, statist, whatever. These guys stood for something a thousand times worse than the bitter hyperpartisanship they whined about: a wish-washy just do something attitude towards governance rooted in the pipe dreams of 'radical centrists.'" At least one candidate was also critical of the long, complex, and unreliable verification process for delegates.

== See also ==
- Better for America
- No Labels
