= John Kingston III =

American attorney and political activist (born 1965)

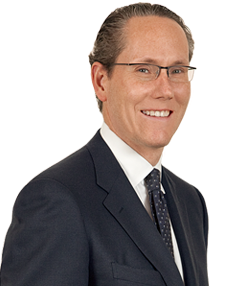
- Born: October 23, 1965 (age 60); Norwich, Connecticut, U.S.
- Education: University of Pennsylvania (BS, BA); Harvard University (JD)
- Occupations: Attorney, investor, political activist
- Political party: Forward (since 2022) Republican (before 2022)
- Spouse: Jean Yih
- Children: 4
- Website: johnkingston.com

John Kingston III (born October 23, 1965) is an American attorney, investor, and political activist based in Boston. He is the founder and president of the non-profit organization Better for America. He also co-founded the non-profit organizations SixSeeds, Sword & Spoon Foundation, and Sword & Spoon Workshop. He was an executive producer for the 2014 documentary Mitt, which premiered at the Sundance Film Festival in January 2014.

== Early life ==
Kingston was born in 1965 in Norwich, Connecticut, to John ("Jack") Kingston Jr., a teacher, and Jayne (née Christian) Kingston. He attended the University of Pennsylvania where he received a B.S. in organizational behavior from the Wharton School, and a B.A. in sociology. At the University of Pennsylvania, he was a member of Alpha Phi Alpha fraternity, the gospel choir, and the cross-country and track teams. Following his graduation from college, Kingston entered Harvard Law School in 1991, where he was a teaching fellow for Robert Coles. While at Harvard, Kingston founded the Society for Law, Life and Religion. He also helped found the Veritas Forum.

== Legal career ==
After graduation from law school in 1994, Kingston began his legal career at Ropes & Gray LLP and focused on corporate and securities laws issues, specializing in the investment management industry. Subsequently, he became Senior Counsel at Miller Anderson & Sherrerd LLP, a division of Morgan Stanley. In 1999, he joined Affiliated Managers Group, a global asset management company with more than $700 billion in assets under management. In 2002, he became general counsel, responsible for legal, regulatory, compliance, and corporate governance functions, as well as oversight of risk management and controls. Kingston became secretary and senior vice president at AMG in 2002, executive vice president in 2006, and vice chairman in 2011, before retiring from the company in 2015.

== Civic involvement ==
Kingston serves on the boards of the Pioneer Institute, the Veritas Forum, the Foundation for Excellence in Higher Education, and Beliefnet. He is a founder and Chairman of the Board of the Sword & Spoon Foundation, Sword & Spoon Workshop, SixSeeds, and Better for America. He is a member of the Campaign to Fix the Debt, the American Enterprise Institute National Council, and was formerly Vice Chairman of the National Faith and Values Steering Committee for Mitt Romney's 2008 presidential campaign. He was a member of the National Republican Senatorial Committee Majority Makers and the Republican Governors Association Executive Roundtable.

In 2016, Kingston launched the non-partisan initiative Better for America, a presidential ballot access program to ensure a pathway for an independent candidate to run for President of the United States in 2016.

=== Political candidacy ===
On October 25, 2017, Kingston announced his candidacy as a Republican candidate for the U.S. Senate seat held by Elizabeth Warren of the Democratic Party. In the Republican primary election held on September 4, 2018, Kingston finished second in a field of three candidates, with Massachusetts House of Representatives member Geoff Diehl finishing first.

== Personal life ==
Kingston and Jean Yih met while both were undergraduate students at the University of Pennsylvania, married in 1991, and have four children.
