= Peter Skewes =

American professor

- Born: 1957 (age 68–69); Glastonbury, Connecticut, United States
- Education: University of New Haven (B.S.); University of Florida (M.S.); Virginia Tech (Ph.D.)
- Occupation: University Professor
- Employer: Clemson University
- Known for: Candidate in the 2016 United States presidential election
- Political party: American Party of South Carolina
- Spouse: Teresa

Peter Skewes (born 1957) is an American university professor and political activist best known for his candidacy for president of the United States as the nominee of the American Party of South Carolina in the 2016 presidential election.

== Early life and education ==
Skewes was born in Glastonbury, Connecticut, and earned a Bachelor of Science degree in forensic science from the University of New Haven in 1979, going on to receive a Master of Science in Poultry Physiology from the University of Florida in 1982 and a Ph.D. in Animal Physiology from Virginia Tech in 1985. He was the 1985 recipient of the Graduate Student Research Manuscript Award from the Poultry Science Association.

== Career ==
=== Academia ===
Skewes began teaching animal and veterinary science at Clemson University in 1985; there, he studies animal welfare issues and the behavior of domestic animals. At Clemson, in addition to his teaching and research duties, Skewes served as chair of the university's Institutional Animal Care and Use Committee. Skewes also serves on the editorial board of the scholarly journal Poultry Science.

=== Politics ===
In May 2016 Skewes won the nomination of the American Party of South Carolina in a three-way contest; the party had been founded in 2014 by former South Carolina Superintendent of Education Jim Rex. According to Skewes, he was motivated to run for president because, for the first time in his life he was "not going to be able to vote for the president with a clear conscience", regardless of which of the Democratic or Republican candidates were ultimately nominated by their respective parties. During his campaign, he walked 240 miles across South Carolina as part of a publicity stunt to raise awareness for his candidacy. Rex commented on Skewes' walk that it was "a testament to the fact that the American Party has an ability to attract a different type of person to run for public office".

According to Skewes' campaign website, he advocated eliminating Super PACs, abolishing the United States Electoral College, supporting family planning education to "reduce unplanned pregnancies", and instituting "a national drug registry to reduce abuse of prescription drugs". Skewes told the Greenville News that he would consider his candidacy a success if he placed third in the presidential vote in South Carolina. Skewes ultimately placed seventh out of seven candidates, receiving 3,221 votes, or about 0.2-percent of the total ballots cast in South Carolina.

== Personal life ==
Skewes is married; his wife, Teresa, is an employee of Clemson University.
