= Mark Weatherford =

American cybersecurity professional (born 1956)

- Born: September 19, 1956 (age 69); Marysville, California, U.S.
- Occupations: cybersecurity, Booking Holdings

Mark Weatherford is an American cybersecurity professional who has held a variety of executive level positions in both the public and private sectors. He was appointed as the first deputy under secretary for cybersecurity in the Obama administration at the US Department of Homeland Security from 2011 to 2013. As of August 2025 he is the Head of Cybersecurity Policy and Strategy at NVIDIA, having been before that vice president of policy and standards at Gretel until April 2025.

Weatherford is a graduate of the University of Arizona in Tucson, Arizona, and holds a master's degree from the Naval Postgraduate School in Monterey, California. He also holds the Certified Information Systems Security Professional (CISSP) certification. He is a former of US Navy cryptologic officer and led the Navy's Computer Network Defense operations and the Naval Computer Incident Response Team (NAVCIRT).

Before joining the DHS, he served (2010–11) as the vice president and chief security officer of the North American Electric Reliability Corporation (NERC), where he directed the organization's critical infrastructure and cybersecurity program for electric utilities across North America. He was also appointed by Governor Arnold Schwarzenegger as the state of California's first Chief Information Security Officer in the Office of Information Security (2008–09), and was also the first Chief Information Security Officer (CISO) for the State of Colorado (2004–07), where he was appointed by both Governor Bill Owens and Governor Bill Ritter. Most notably, he helped establish the state's first cybersecurity program and spearheaded some of the nation's first cybersecurity legislation aimed to protect citizens.

After leaving the DHS, he was a principal with the Chertoff Group in Washington DC, and senior vice president and chief cybersecurity strategist of vArmour.

Weatherford was one of Information Security magazine's "Security 7 Award" winners in 2008 and was awarded SC Magazine's "CSO of the Year" award in 2010, In 2012 and 2013 he was named one of the "10 Most Influential People in Government Information Security" by GovInfoSecurity. He is a member of the Marysville High School, Marysville, California, Hall of Fame and was inducted into the Information Systems Security Association (ISSA) International Hall of Fame in October 2018.
