= Rod Silva (businessman) =

American restaurateur (born c. 1972)

- Born: 1972 (age 53–54); Newark, New Jersey, U.S.
- Occupation: Businessman
- Known for: Founder of Muscle Maker Grill
- Political party: Nutrition Party

Rod Silva (born c. 1972) is an American restaurateur. He was the nominee of the Nutrition Party, which he created for the 2016 United States presidential election.

== Biography ==
Silva was born in Newark, New Jersey, the son of Brazilian immigrants. Silva founded the Muscle Maker Grill restaurant in 1995 to provide healthy alternatives to fast food. The fast casual chain became a franchised brand in 2007.

In 2015, the Muscle Maker Grill chain was acquired by an affiliate of American Restaurant Holdings Inc. At the time, the chain was reported to have 55 restaurants. Silva remained associated with the restaurant chain after the sale as director of brand development.

Silva appeared on an episode of the reality television series Undercover Boss in January 2016, in which American Restaurant Holdings chairman Tim Betts posed as a new employee of Muscle Maker Grill. Silva did not go undercover in the episode himself; instead, he gave Betts advice through an earpiece.

== Presidential campaign ==
A resident of Piscataway, New Jersey, Silva filed a statement of candidacy for President of the United States on October 20, 2015. According to his campaign website, his platform "will be heavily focused on first addressing serious issues taking place at home here in America, like the increasing rates of obesity, diabetes, high blood pressure, hypertension, cholesterol and other health-related complications – all resulting from poor eating choices."

Silva's presidential campaign achieved ballot status for 2016 in Colorado only. His vice presidential running mate was his brother Richard Silva, a doctor from Fort Lauderdale, Florida. According to unofficial results released by the Colorado Secretary of State, Silva received 751 votes for president in the state.
