= Kahlil Byrd =

American businessman

Kahlil Byrd (KB)
- Born: Kahlil Julian Byrd
- Education: Morehouse College, B.A. Harvard Kennedy School, MPA
- Known for: CEO of Americans Elect
- Spouse: Sarah Haacke Byrd (2011–present)

Kahlil Julian Byrd (KB) is a political advisor and entrepreneur regarded as an expert in national cross-partisan reform. He has led several national political organizations in the United States. Byrd is founder and CEO of Shur, a financial services company, that works with student loan borrowers in their workplaces to help them move to financial capability. Byrd is founder and CEO of Invest America Fund, a public policy, reform, investment research, data and advisory firm. He is a Life Member of the Council on Foreign Relations.

He was CEO of Americans Elect, a reform organization that sought to use online voting for state primaries to support a bipartisan ticket for the 2012 United States presidential election outside the two parties.

== Education ==
Byrd holds a Master of Public Administration from the Harvard Kennedy School and a Bachelor of Arts in Political Science from Morehouse College.

== Democracy reform ==
Byrd began his career in broadcast journalism, working for National Public Radio in Washington, D.C. He later joined The BBC as a producer. Following his graduate studies at Harvard, Byrd became an entrepreneur to focus on "driving events" rather than just commenting and interpreting them. In 2005, he was appointed spokesman and communications director for Deval Patrick's 2006 campaign for governor of Massachusetts. Byrd left the campaign in April 2006 to "return to business interests". In 2007, Byrd joined the Patrick administration as Director of Gubernatorial Appointments.

Byrd was also a Term Member and an International Affairs Fellow with the Council on Foreign Relations.

Byrd was the first president of StudentsFirst, the grassroots education reform advocacy organization founded by Michelle Rhee, former chancellor of District of Columbia Schools. StudentsFirst was a non-profit organization based in Sacramento, California. As president, Byrd managed the organization's long-term strategy, operations budget and growth. In announcing his departure in July 2013, Rhee credited Byrd with "leav[ing] the organization stronger and more prepared to challenge the status quo on behalf of kids".

From 2009 through the 2012 election cycle, Byrd was chief executive of Americans Elect, a national organization that aimed, through technology, to nominate and bipartisan ticket for president. Under Byrd’s leadership Americans Elect was placed on the ballot in 29 states to conduct an online convention, with the intention of placing a cross partisan presidential ticket on all 50 state ballots. During the 2012 presidential election cycle, Americans Elect worked to nominate and elect a third-party candidate for president, but no candidate gained sufficient support to meet the national threshold for candidacy for the convention, as established by the organization. In May 2012, Americans Elect decided to suspend the planned online convention without fielding a candidate. but not before being widely praised for its technology and brand innovations. The organization won 2012 People’s Choice Award at South by Southwest, the Campaigns & Elections 2012 CampaignTech Innovator Award, and Campaigns & Elections Magazine awarded Byrd a Campaign Tech Innovator award in the nonpartisan innovator category. The organization was awarded two 2012 CLIO Awards, for content and interactive excellence. During his tenure, the organization raised over US$40 million and established a fully functioning start-up with over 150 paid staff, 4,000 contractors and 3,000 volunteers nationwide. Over two years, Americans Elect had 3.5 million unique visitors to its website and acquired more than 450,000 members.

== Shur ==
Byrd is founder and CEO of Shur. Founded in 2020, Shur is a B2B2C fintech/insurtech company, building financial solutions for America's Student Loan Borrowers. Working with companies, cities, and membership organizations.

In 2021, Shur, in partnership with Equifax® and VantageScore™ conducted a comprehensive pre- and during-pandemic analysis of student borrower financial wellness. The national studies of nearly 9 million student loan records brought a clear understanding of who the student loan borrower is, whose credit scores leave them undervalued, and why

Since late 2022, Shur has partnered with Edward Jones to analyze the financial situation of borrowers in the St. Louis region. Edward Jones is conducting a program focused on the financial outcomes of employees, customers, and residents in the St. Louis region.

In 2023, Shur became a member of the Council for Inclusive Capitalism. The Council consists of national and global corporations and thought leaders focused on building wealth, and creating value for employees, communities, and the planet.

== Invest America ==
Byrd is founder and CEO of Invest America, a seed fund focused on financing and guiding political reform investors by leveraging data, analytics and nationwide research. Invest America advises entrepreneurs, family offices, foundations, and corporations in efforts to develop effective, issue-driven spending programs and strategies for investing effectively in winning across the issue spectrum.

Invest America partners include Ipsos Public Affairs, the world’s third-largest marketing research firm, with whom Invest America has launched "Our Age of Uncertainty", a sustained national discussion and public private engagement. This initiative is designed to shape the thinking and understanding of America’s top 200 influencers and decision makers as they grapple with an historically political environment in the United States and throughout the world.

In January 2019, the Washington Post reported that Byrd and Invest America are among the insiders working with former Starbucks Chairman Howard Schultz in his "extensive operation" to explore an independent bid for president. According to the article, Byrd is working on ballot access plans alongside Kellen Arno of Grandview Campaigns. The article stated, "If he moves forward, Schultz this fall would begin the process of collecting signatures to gain ballot access in all 50 states. The campaign would have a goal of polling above 15 percent nationally to ensure Schultz’s inclusion in the general-election debates."

== Honors and affiliations ==
Byrd is a board member or advisor of a number of organizations, including With Honor and Take Back our Republic. He is also a council member at NationSwell and an alumnus of the Council on Foreign Relations International Fellows program. Byrd is a senior advisor and board member of With Honor, which is helping to elect principled military veterans in Congress and help amplify their cross-partisan agenda that finds solutions for the American people. Byrd is a member of the steering and investor group at LeadershipNow LeadershipNow is a membership organization of business and thought leaders taking action to protect and renew American democracy.

== Personal life ==
Byrd is married to Sarah Haacke Byrd, CEO at Women Moving Millions. Haacke Byrd previously held directorships at the Joyful Heart Foundation, Bellevue/NYU Program for Survivors of Torture Facing History and Ourselves (Choosing to Participate initiative, advancing civic participation and positive change in democracy) and the Anti-Defamation League.
