= Mindy Finn =

American digital media expert (born 1981)

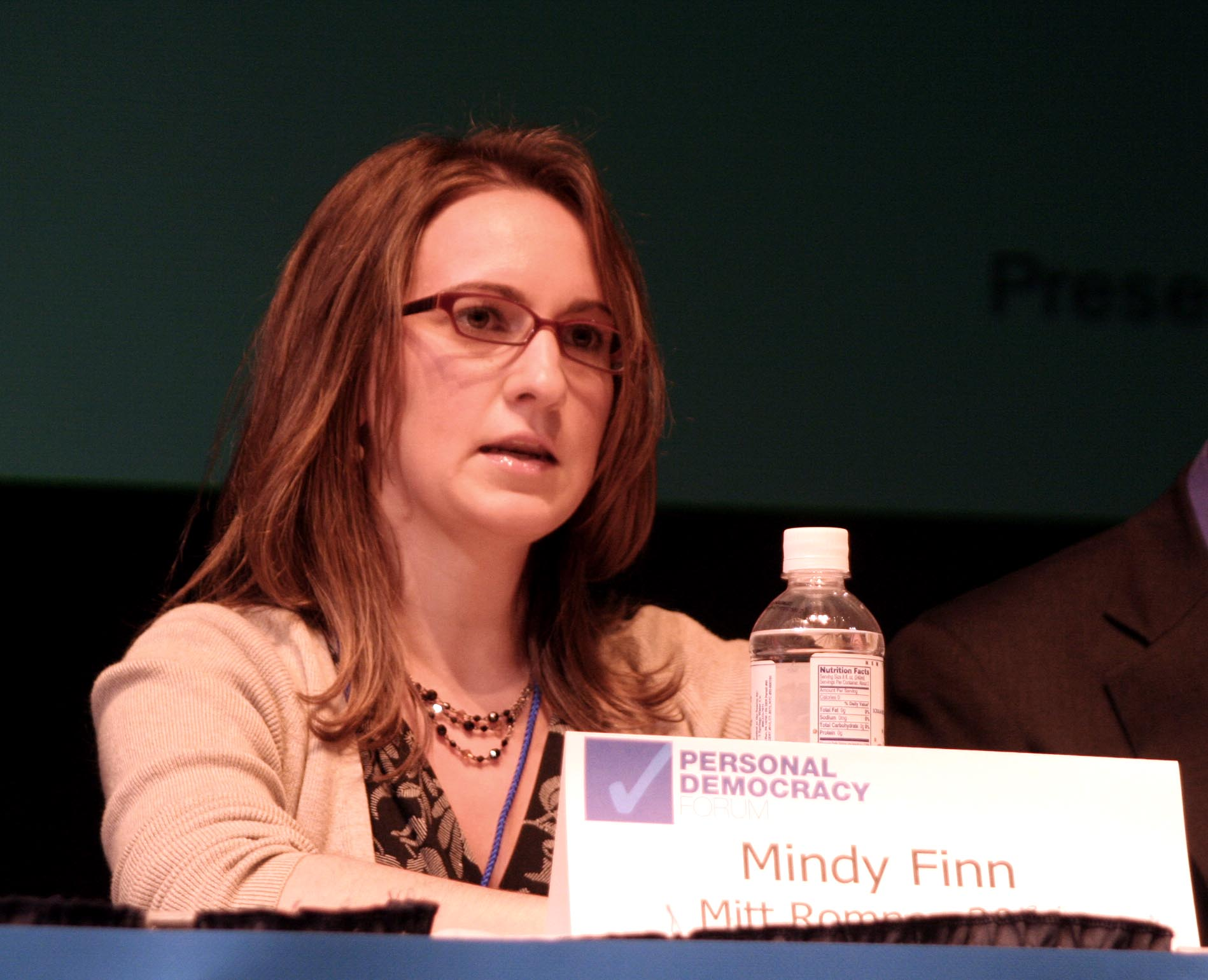
- Finn in 2007

Vice President of Advancement of the Forward Party
- Incumbent
- Assumed office March 16, 2026
- Preceded by: Position established

Personal details
- Born: February 10, 1981 (age 45) Houston, Texas, U.S.
- Party: Republican (Before 2016); Independent (2016–2026); Forward (2026–present)
- Children: 3
- Education: Boston University (BA); George Washington University (MA)

Mindy Finn (born February 10, 1981) is an American digital media expert, political and technology consultant, and entrepreneur. She worked as a digital strategist for the Republican Party, most notably for George W. Bush and Mitt Romney's presidential campaigns in 2004 and 2008, respectively, and became the vice presidential candidate for Evan McMullin's 2016 presidential campaign. Finn co-founded the organizations Stand Up Republic and Empowered Women, working to make elections more inclusive. She joined the Forward Party in 2026.

== Early life and education ==
Finn was born in Houston and raised as an only child by her single mother in Kingwood, Texas. She attended Kingwood High School, where she was a member of the drill team and National Honor Society, as well as a math tutor. Finn earned her bachelor's degree in journalism from Boston University, and a master's degree in political management at George Washington University (GWU). She was named a fellow at GWU's Institute of Politics, Democracy and the Internet in 2007.

== Career ==
Early in her career, Finn was a journalist and worked as congressional correspondent for the Republican-American, a family-owned newspaper based in Waterbury, Connecticut. She started as an intern on the same day as the September 11 attacks (2001), which she covered by writing a series of front-page articles. She transitioned from journalism to politics, working on Capitol Hill for Lamar Smith and others. Finn later was a digital strategist for the Republican Party, working on operations programs for George W. Bush's 2004 presidential campaign and leading digital efforts for Mitt Romney's 2008 president campaign. She co-founded the digital fundraising and media firm Engage with Patrick Ruffini. During 2011–2013, she helped Twitter develop strategic partnerships in Washington, D.C. She has also completed strategic work for the Republican National Committee (c. 2015) and Google.

Finn founded the nonprofit organization Empowered Women in 2015, which seeks to promote discussion around feminism and women's empowerment throughout the U.S. She continued as president, as of 2016. Shushannah Walshe of ABC News described the organization as "a network to connect center-right and independent women", and Elle's Rachael Combe called Finn "one of the few people outside of liberal circles actively organizing women under a feminist banner". Finn has also advocated for more women, especially conservatives, to run for office. She also was on the Democracy Fund's bipartisan National Advisory Committee in 2016. Finn speaks about politics and technology and has appeared on media outlets such as C-SPAN, Fox News, MSNBC, and NPR.

Finn was a vice presidential candidate for Evan McMullin's 2016 presidential campaign. Finn, who previously considered herself a "lifelong" Republican, distanced herself from the party under Donald Trump and other leaders, including Mitch McConnell and Paul Ryan. She was an early member of the Never Trump movement, and helped form a political action committee to support the movement. She has been credited for launching the 'NeverTrump' hashtag, and has been described as the "new face of the 'never Trump' Republicans". She also studied the nativism fueling Trump's rise. As a candidate, Finn advocated for paid time off for women, child care improvements, and tax law simplification. She also supported entitlement reform efforts around Social Security.

In 2017, Finn and McMullin co-founded Stand Up Republic, which seeks to strengthen democracy in the U.S. Finn became executive director of the government accountability organization, which has chapters in eighteen U.S. states, as of 2020. Stand Up Republic has worked to defeat select Republican politicians, including Dan Bishop, Roy Moore, Devin Nunes, and Steve King, and supported the impeachment of Trump. In 2020, Finn was named one of sixteen inaugural Brewer Fellows to Unite America, a fellowship established by the Woodrow Wilson National Fellowship Foundation in partnership with Cultivate the Karass and the Unite America Fund. She founded and is chief executive of Citizen Data as of June 2020. Finn joined the Forward Party in March 2026 as Vice President of Advancement, responsible for fundraising, development, and donor engagement.

=== Recognition ===
Finn was named one of the "50 Politicos to Watch" by Politico in 2011. She was also included in the news organization's list of "top tweeters". Molly Ball described Finn's Twitter feed as "a cross section of her wide-ranging reading list, peppered with personal observations", and Finn had 4,650 followers, as of July 2011. For co-founding Engage, and for her work for Twitter, Washingtonian named Finn one of the "top 100 tech titans... mostly for her ability to mesh government and online strategy together".

In 2013, Grace Wyler and Brett LoGiurato of Business Insider included Finn in their list of "the 50 hottest people in online politics" for her political and advocacy work on Twitter, writing, "Finn has played a key role in making Twitter the go-to social media platform in the political sphere." In 2017, Finn was one of eight recipients of the George Washington Alumni Association's Distinguished Alumni Achievement Award.

== Personal life ==
Finn is Jewish with two sons and one daughter. She lives in Washington, D.C., as of 2017.
