= Better for America =

American non-profit organization

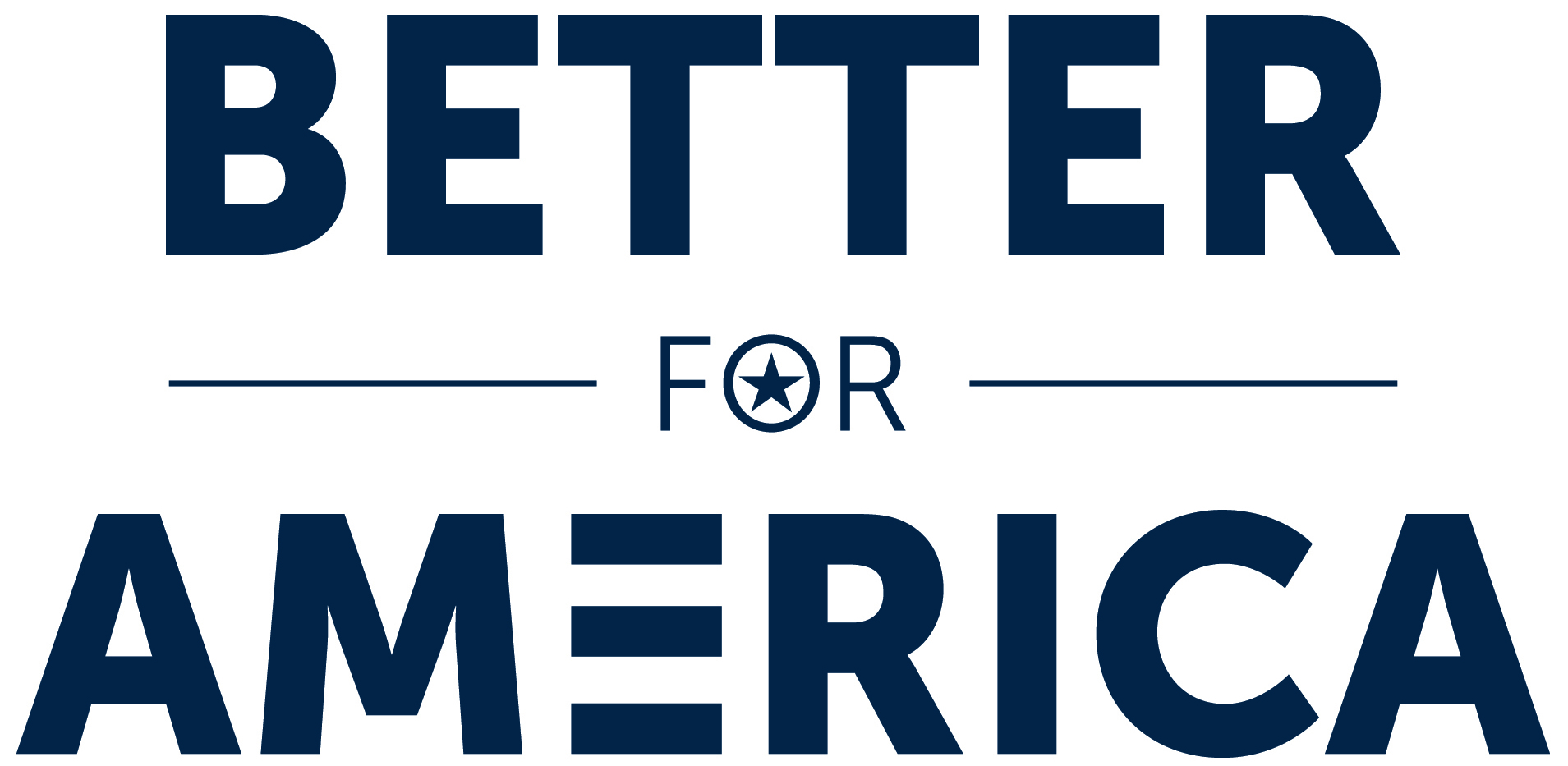
- Formation: 2016; 10 years ago
- Founders: John Kingston III, Joel Searby
- Type: 501c4
- Legal status: Inactive
- Purpose: Ballot Access for 2016 Presidential Election
- Headquarters: New York City, New York, U.S.
- Key people: John Kingston III (Chair); Anne MacDonald (Executive Director); Joel Searby (Chief Strategy Officer)
- Website: www.betterforamerica.com

Better for America (BFA) is a 501(c)(4) non-profit organization that was dedicated to getting nationwide ballot access for an independent candidate for President of the United States in the 2016 election. The effort was inspired by the unpopularity of the two major party nominees, Donald Trump and Hillary Clinton, and was seen as part of the Never Trump movement.

The organization's initial strategy was to gain ballot access in states that do not require a candidate to be named, and then name its candidate after the major party conventions. The candidate was planned to be named by an advisory board rather than through traditional primary elections, or through a crowdsourcing effort like the failed Americans Elect effort in the 2012 election. On August 8, 2016, it was reported that Evan McMullin, an anti-Trump Republican and former Central Intelligence Agency (CIA) official, would be Better for America's nominee. McMullin was officially nominated on August 24.

In July, the organization filed petitions in New Mexico and Arkansas. Arkansas accepted the petition but New Mexico said there were not enough valid signatures. After a challenge in court, the New Mexico Secretary of State reversed his decision and placed Better For America on the ballot.

On August 22, 2016, BFA announced it would cease new ballot access efforts.

Notable people involved in the organization include conservative donor John Kingston III and former New Jersey Governor Christine Todd Whitman. Lawrence Lessig and Randy Barnett expressed their support for the organization in a Time opinion piece.
