= List of American Enterprise Institute scholars and fellows =

The following notable persons are or have in the past been scholars, fellows, or staff members affiliated with the American Enterprise Institute for Public Policy Research (AEI). If known, titles and dates of affiliation are included.

== Politicians and government officials ==
- William J. Baroody Jr., executive vice president (1977–78), president (1978–1986)
- Richard Bolling, visiting fellow (1984–1991)
- John R. Bolton, senior vice president (1999–2001), senior fellow (2006– )
- Clarence J. Brown Jr., senior fellow (1983)
- Lynne V. Cheney, senior fellow (1993– )
- Richard B. Cheney, senior fellow (1993–1995), trustee (1995–2000)
- Barber Conable, senior fellow (1985–86)
- Bùi Diễm, visiting scholar (1984– )
- Gerald R. Ford, distinguished fellow (1977–2006)
- Malcolm Fraser, distinguished international fellow (1984–1986)
- David Gergen, resident fellow (1978–1981)
- Newt Gingrich, senior fellow (1999–2011)
- Robert P. Griffin, senior fellow (1979– )
- Philip Habib, senior fellow (1983–1986)
- Ayaan Hirsi Ali, resident fellow (2006– )
- Alan Keyes, resident scholar (1987–1989)
- Jeane J. Kirkpatrick, resident scholar, senior fellow (1977–1981, 1985–2006)
- James R. Lilley, senior fellow (1993–2009) (Deceased)
- Lawrence B. Lindsey, Arthur F. Burns Fellow in Economic Policy Studies (1997–2001), visiting scholar (2003– )
- Roger F. Noriega, visiting fellow (2005– )
- Mark McClellan, visiting senior fellow (2006–2008)
- Daniel Patrick Moynihan, member, Council of Academic Advisers (2001–2003)
- Richard Perle, resident fellow (1987– )
- Radek Sikorski, resident fellow and director, New Atlantic Initiative (2002–2005)
- John W. Snow, visiting fellow (1977–1980), trustee (1995–2003)
- Bill Thomas, visiting fellow (2007– )
- Fred Thompson, visiting fellow (2003–2007)
- Peter J. Wallison, resident fellow (1999–2007), Arthur F. Burns Fellow in Financial Policy Studies (2007– )
- Paul Wolfowitz, visiting scholar (2007– ), member, Council of Academic Advisers (1998–2001)

== Academics ==
- Roger Bate, resident fellow (2003– )
- Gary S. Becker, member, Council of Academic Advisers
- Jagdish Bhagwati, adjunct scholar (1993– )
- Michael Boskin, visiting scholar (1993–94)
- David F. Bradford, visiting scholar (1993–94)
- Arthur C. Brooks, visiting scholar (2007–2008), president (2009– )
- Arthur F. Burns, distinguished scholar (1978–1981, 1985–1987)
- Eliot A. Cohen, member, Council of Academic Advisers (2002–2007)
- Kenneth W. Dam, member, Council of Academic Advisers
- Nicholas Eberstadt, visiting fellow, Henry Wendt Scholar (1985– )
- Martin Feldstein, member, Council of Academic Advisers (2008–2019)
- Mark Falcoff, resident scholar (1981– )
- David Gelernter, national fellow (2006– )
- Robert P. George, member, Council of Academic Advisers (2009– )
- Robert Goldwin, resident scholar and then resident scholar emeritus (1976–2010)
- Kenneth P. Green, resident scholar and interim director of AEI's Center for Regulatory Studies (2006– )
- Gottfried Haberler, resident scholar (1971–1995)
- Kevin A. Hassett, resident scholar (1997–2007), senior fellow (2007– ), director of economic policy studies (2003– )
- Steven F. Hayward, F. K. Weyerhaeuser Fellow (2002– )
- Frederick M. Hess, resident scholar and director of education policy studies (2002– )
- Gertrude Himmelfarb, member, Council of Academic Advisers
- R. Glenn Hubbard, visiting scholar (1995–2001, 2003– ), director of tax policy program (1995–2001), member of Council of Academic Advisers (2007– )
- Samuel P. Huntington, member, Council of Academic Advisers ( –2008)
- Frederick W. Kagan, resident scholar (2005– )
- Leon R. Kass, W. H. Brady Fellow, Hertog Fellow (1991–92, 1998–99, 2001– )
- Lawrence Korb, director, defense policy studies (1980–81)
- Irving Kristol, resident scholar, senior fellow (1976–2009)
- Randall Kroszner, visiting scholar (2003–2006)
- William Landes, member, Council of Academic Advisers (c. 1990–2009)
- Michael Ledeen, Freedom Scholar (1989–2008)
- Guenter Lewy, visiting scholar (1981– )
- Seymour Martin Lipset, adjunct scholar (1973–2007)
- John Lott, adjunct and resident scholar (1995–2006)
- Glenn Loury, member, Council of Academic Advisers (1993–1996)
- John H. Makin, resident scholar and director of fiscal studies (1984–2015)
- Michael J. Malbin, resident fellow (1977–1986)
- N. Gregory Mankiw, visiting scholar (2005– )
- Thomas E. Mann, visiting fellow (1979–1981), adjunct scholar (1981–1985)
- Harvey C. Mansfield, visiting scholar (2008)
- Paul W. McCracken, chairman of the Council of Academic Advisers (1962–1986), interim president (1986), emeritus trustee (1986– )
- Allan H. Meltzer, visiting scholar (1989– )
- James C. Miller III, adjunct scholar (1975–1977), resident scholar (1977–1981)
- Joshua Muravchik, resident scholar (1987–2008)
- Charles Murray, Bradley Fellow, senior fellow, W. H. Brady Scholar (1990– )
- Robert Nisbet, adjunct scholar, member of the Council of Academic Advisers (1973–1986)
- Michael Novak, resident scholar, George Frederick Jewett Scholar in Religion, Philosophy, and Public Policy (1978– )
- Norman J. Ornstein, resident scholar (1979– )
- Sam Peltzman, member, Council of Academic Advisers (c. 1990– )
- Nelson W. Polsby, member, Council of Academic Advisers (1987–2007)
- George L. Priest, member, Council of Academic Advisers (1995– )
- Austin Ranney, resident scholar (1976–1985)
- Vincent Reinhart, resident scholar (2007– )
- Michael Rubin, resident scholar (2004– )
- Allen Schick, adjunct scholar (1981–1985), visiting scholar (1985– )
- Roger Scruton, visiting scholar (2009–2020)
- Gary J. Schmitt, resident scholar (2005– )
- Christina Hoff Sommers, W. H. Brady Fellow, resident scholar (1997– )
- Thomas Sowell, member, Council of Academic Advisers (1997–2001)
- Herbert Stein, senior fellow (1975–1999), member, Council of Academic Advisers
- Richard Vedder, adjunct scholar
- George M. von Furstenberg, resident scholar (1976)
- Graham Walker, visiting scholar (1998–2002)
- Sir Alan Arthur Walters, senior fellow (1983–1989)
- Murray Weidenbaum, adjunct scholar, resident scholar, member of the Council of Academic Advisers (1972–2009)
- James Q. Wilson, chairman of the Council of Academic Advisers (1991– )
- Richard J. Zeckhauser, member, Council of Academic Advisers (1997– )

== Jurists and legal scholars ==
- Walter Berns, resident scholar (1979– )
- Robert H. Bork, adjunct scholar, senior fellow (1971–1973, 1977–1982, 1988–2003)
- Charles M. Seeger, research advisory committee; Project on the Economics and Regulation of Future Markets (1985)
- Ted Frank, resident fellow (2005–2009)
- Jack Goldsmith, visiting scholar (2004–2008)
- Michael S. Greve, resident scholar, John G. Searle Scholar (2000– )
- Antonin Scalia, visiting scholar (1977), adjunct scholar (1977–1980)
- Laurence H. Silberman, visiting fellow (1977–1985)
- John Yoo, visiting scholar (2003– )

== Authors and journalists ==
- Michael Barone, resident fellow (2007– )
- Sadanand Dhume, resident fellow (2011–2021), senior fellow (2021– )
- Thomas Donnelly, resident fellow (2002–2006, 2007– )
- Dinesh D'Souza, John M. Olin fellow (1989– )
- David Frum, resident fellow (2002–2010)
- Jeffrey Gedmin, resident scholar (1996–2001)
- James K. Glassman, DeWitt Wallace/Reader's Digest Fellow, resident fellow, senior fellow (1997–2008), founding editor, The American
- Jonah Goldberg, research assistant to Ben J. Wattenberg (1992–94)
- Herbert G. Klein, national fellow (2004– )
- Laurie Mylroie, former adjunct fellow
- William Schneider, resident fellow (1986–2004)
- Ben J. Wattenberg, visiting fellow, senior fellow (1977– )
- Karl Zinsmeister, research associate to Ben J. Wattenberg (1982–1986), DeWitt Wallace/Reader's Digest Fellow (1994–1995), editor, The American Enterprise (1995–2006)

== Other ==
- William Anders, visiting fellow (1977)
- William J. Baroody Sr., president (1962–1978)
- Karlyn Bowman, managing editor, Public Opinion (1979–1990), editor, The American Enterprise (1990–1995), resident fellow (1982–2007), senior fellow (2007– )
- Christopher DeMuth, president (1986–2008), D. C. Searle Senior Fellow (2009– )
- Reuel Marc Gerecht, resident fellow (2001–2008)
- Desmond Lachman, resident fellow (2003–}
- Danielle Pletka, vice president for foreign and defense policy studies (2002– )
- Joe Ricketts, board member (1999–2007)
- Jonathan Rauch, visiting fellow (1989)
- Sally Satel, resident scholar (2000– )
- Bernard Adolph Schriever, visiting fellow (1990– )
