= Zack Cooper =

American international relations scholar

- Education: Stanford University (BA), Princeton University (MPA, MA, PhD)
- Occupations: National security and defense analyst
- Employer: American Enterprise Institute
- Board member of: Center on Sanctions and Illicit Finance, Foundation for Defense of Democracies; Open Technology Fund

Zack Cooper is an American national security and foreign policy analyst currently serving as a senior fellow at the American Enterprise Institute (AEI), an adjunct assistant professor at Georgetown University, and a lecturer in Public and International Affairs at Princeton University. He also serves on the advisory boards of the Open Technology Fund and the Foundation for Defense of Democracies' Center on Sanctions and Illicit Finance.

Cooper's research focuses on US strategy and alliance building in Asia and US-China relations.

== Education ==
Cooper holds a BA in public policy from Stanford University. He earned a MA and a PhD in security studies as well as a MPA in international relations from Princeton University.

== Career ==
From 2005 to 2006, Cooper was a foreign affairs specialist at the U.S. Department of Defense and later became special assistant to the principal deputy under secretary of defense for policy from 2006 to 2007. From 2007 to 2008, he served as assistant to the deputy national security adviser for combating terrorism in the White House National Security Council.

In 2010, Cooper joined the Center for Strategic and Budgetary Assessments as a Research Fellow and in 2013, joined the Center for Strategic and International Studies as a Senior Fellow for Asian Security. In 2019, he was appointed co-director of and senior fellow at the Alliance for Securing Democracy at the German Marshall Fund.

Cooper is a participant of the Task Force on U.S.-China Policy convened by Asia Society's Center on US-China Relations.

== On US-Taiwan relations ==
In October 2023, Cooper visited Taiwan and met with President Tsai Ing-wen as a part of an AEI delegation led by Robert Doar, along with Kori Schake, Nicholas Eberstadt, Dan Blumenthal, among others.

== Publications ==
=== Articles ===
- Does America Have an End Game on China? Foreign Policy & ChinaFile, December 15, 2023
- Biden's Asia Diplomacy is Still Incomplete, War on the Rocks, August 23, 2023
- America Still Needs to Rebalance to Asia, Foreign Affairs, August 11, 2021 (co-authored with Adam P. Liff)
- U.S.-Chinese Rivalry Is a Battle Over Values, Foreign Affairs, March 16, 2021 (co-authored with Hal Brands)
- Democratic Values Are a Competitive Advantage, Foreign Affairs, December 22, 2020 (co-authored with Laura Rosenberger)
- To Arm or to Ally? The Patron's Dilemma and the Strategic Logic of Arms Transfers and Alliances, International Security, October 1, 2016 (co-authored with Keren Yarhi-Milo and Alexander Lanoszka)

=== Reports ===
- Countering Coercion in Maritime Asia, CSIS, May 5, 2017 (co-authored with Michael J. Green, Kathleen H. Hicks, John Schaus, and Jake Douglas)

=== Edited volumes ===
- Postwar Japan: Growth, Security, and Uncertainty Since 1945, CSIS/Rowman & Littlefield, 2017 (co-edited with Michael J. Green)
- Strategic Japan: New Approaches to Foreign Policy and the U.S.-Japan Alliance, CSIS/Rowman & Littlefield, 2014 (co-edited with Michael J. Green)
