= Dan Blumenthal =

American security analyst

- Other names: 卜大年
- Education: Washington University in St. Louis (BA); Johns Hopkins University SAIS (MA); Duke University (JD)
- Occupations: East Asian security analyst, former U.S. Defense Department senior official
- Employer: American Enterprise Institute
- Board member of: Project 2049 Institute

Dan Blumenthal (born 1972) is an American security analyst focused on East Asia and US-China-Taiwan relations; he is currently serving as a senior fellow at the American Enterprise Institute (AEI) and an advisory board member of the Project 2049 Institute. He was Senior Country Director for China, Taiwan, Hong Kong, and Mongolia at the US Department of Defense during the George W. Bush administration.

== Education ==
Blumenthal holds a BA from Washington University in St. Louis, an MA from Johns Hopkins University School of Advanced International Studies, and a JD from Duke Law School. He also studied Chinese at Capitol Normal University.

== Career ==
Blumenthal was a researcher at the Washington Institute for Near East Policy from 1994 to 1996 and joined Kelley Drye & Warren LLP as an associate focused on international corporate law in 2000. During the George W. Bush administration, he served as Country Director for China and Taiwan at the U.S. Defense Department from 2002. In 2004, he was appointed Senior Country Director for China, Taiwan, Hong Kong, and Mongolia. He joined AEI in November 2004. He also served on the US-China Economic and Security Review Commission (USCC) as a commissioner between 2006 and 2012. He was USCC's vice chair in 2007.

Blumenthal co-founded the Alexander Hamilton Society (AHS), a DC-based non-partisan membership organization focused on US national security policy, along with Aaron Friedberg and Roy Katzovicz in March 2010. He continues to serve on AHS' board of directors.

== Views on US-Taiwan relations ==
Blumenthal supported former House speaker Nancy Pelosi's visit to Taiwan in 2022. He said in an interview with PBS NewsHour:

In fact, because it's such a bipartisan issue, I think the speaker might be well-served to take along a high-ranking Republican. There's great bipartisan support for this. China is trying to redefine the one China policy, and we cannot let them do that. We have a one China policy. This is completely consistent with the one China policy. Every day that it intrudes upon Taiwan's air defense zones, every day that it claims that the waters around Taiwan are its sovereign territory is a day that it's coercing Taiwan and it's violating its commitments to us. Its fundamental commitment is a peaceful resolution of the Taiwan issue, and it is violating those fundamental commitments. We're not changing policy. Speaker Pelosi's visit would be consistent with years of precedent.

He added that "China's incremental, creeping escalation, its creeping undermining of Taiwan's sovereignty and political will is going to continue whether she goes or not. If she goes, I think we will be in a better position to stand up to this kind of bullying". In October 2023, he visited Taiwan and met with President Tsai Ing-wen as a part of an AEI delegation led by Robert Doar, along with Kori Schake, Nicholas Eberstadt, Zack Cooper, among others.

== Publications ==
=== Books ===
- The China Nightmare: The Grand Ambitions of a Decaying State (AEI Press, November 2020)
- An Awkward Embrace: The United States and China in the 21st Century (AEI Press, November 2012) (co-authored with Phillip Swagel)

=== Articles ===
- "China has three roads to Taiwan: The US must block them all", The Hill, March 13, 2023 (co-authored with Fred Kagan)
  "China is pursuing three roads to unification, not one. It seeks to persuade the Taiwanese people and the international community to accept unification peacefully. It seeks to coerce such acceptance through forceful means short of war. And it is preparing to compel unification through direct military action."
- "A Strong Military Keeps the Threat of War Small", The New York Times, April 2, 2015
