= Jeffrey Gedmin =

American scholar and author (born 1958)

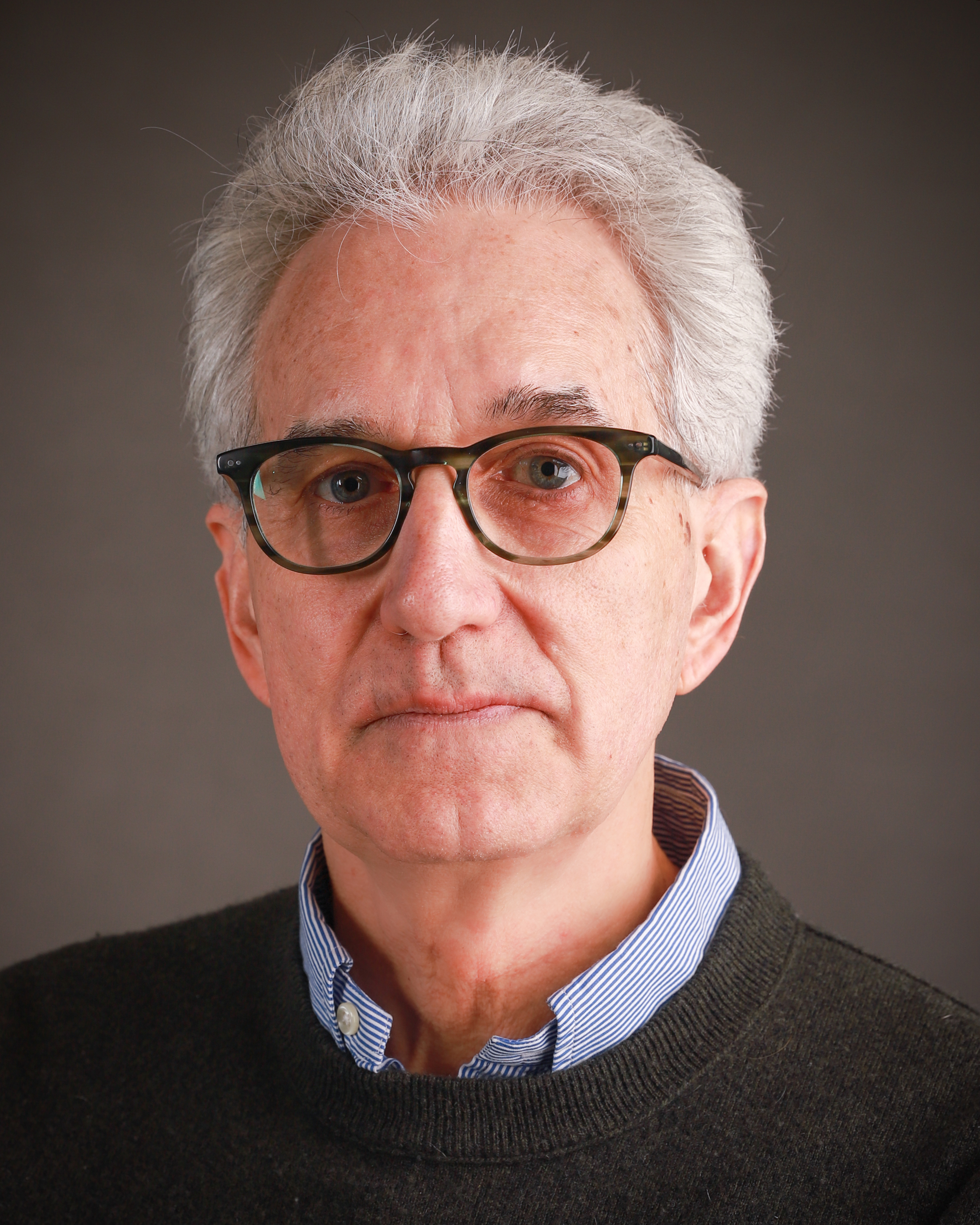
- Gedmin in 2024
- Born: Washington, D.C., U.S.
- Education: Georgetown University (Ph.D.), American University (M.A., B.A.)
- Employer: Institute for Strategic Dialogue

Jeffrey Gedmin (born 1958) is an American scholar and author. He is a senior fellow at Georgetown University and at the Institute for Strategic Dialogue. He was president and CEO of the Legatum Institute in London from 2011 to 2014 and the former president of Radio Free Europe/Radio Liberty from 2007 to 2011.

== Early life and education ==
Gedmin was born in Washington, DC, and raised in Northern Virginia.

He earned his Bachelor of Arts degree in music from American University and also studied musicology for a year at the University of Salzburg in Austria. He earned his master's degree in German Area Studies (Literature concentration) from American University. He received his PhD from Georgetown University in German Area Studies and Linguistics. He is fluent in German.

== Career ==
Gedmin served for nearly six years as director of the Aspen Institute in Berlin, a non-profit, non-partisan organization whose mission is "to foster 'enlightened' leadership and open-minded dialogue." From 1996 to 2001, Gedmin was a resident scholar and executive director of the American Enterprise Institute’s New Atlantic Initiative, a coalition of international institutes, politicians, leading journalists, and business executives seeking to revitalize and expand the Atlantic community of democracies. Leading supporters and participants included Václav Havel, Margaret Thatcher, Henry Kissinger, and US Senators Jesse Helms and Joseph Biden.

Gedmin is a member of the Council on Foreign Relations, and serves on the board of the Council for a Community of Democracies (Washington, DC) and the Program of Atlantic Security Studies (Prague, Czech Republic). In addition, he has taught at Georgetown University and Gonzaga College High School in Washington, DC.

Gedmin has been a frequent contributor to leading US and European newspapers and magazines, including The New York Times, The Washington Post'', USA Today, the Financial Times, The Wall Street Journal, the Weekly Standard, the Daily Telegraph, Die Welt (in which he has been a regular columnist), Frankfurter Allgemeine Zeitung, and The Times.

Gedmin has authored several books, including The Hidden Hand: Gorbachev and the Collapse of East Germany (1992). He edited a collection of essays titled European Integration and the American Interest (1997). Gedmin served as co-executive producer for two major PBS documentaries: The Germans, Portrait of a New Nation (1995), and Spain's 9/11 and the Challenge of Radical Islam in Europe (2007).

Gedmin left the Legatum Institute in early 2014. He is currently a Research Council Member at the National Endowment for Democracy, senior fellow at Georgetown University and at the Institute for Strategic Dialogue.

In October 2018 he was appointed editor-in-chief of The American Interest.

== Personal life ==
In 1993, Gedmin married Jeana Williams. They have a daughter.
