= Peltzman =

Peltzman is a surname. Notable people with the surname include:

- Adam Peltzman, American television writer and producer
- Sam Peltzman (born 1940), American economist

== See also ==
- Peltzman effect, named after the economist Sam Peltzman
