= Michael Strain =

Michael Strain may refer to:

- Michael R. Strain, American economist
- Michael G. Strain (born 1958), Louisiana Agriculture and Forestry Commissioner
