= NGOWatch =

American-based think tank and NGO

NGOWatch initially operated between 2003 and 2007 and was relaunched in May 2009. Its stated goal is to monitor the activities of non-governmental organizations (NGOs) and their impact on public policy. It is a sibling website of Global Governance Watch, a collaborative project of the conservative think tanks the American Enterprise Institute for Public Policy Research and the Federalist Society for Law and Public Policy Studies.

== Goals ==
The resuscitated NGOWatch claims its "goal is to raise awareness about global governance, to monitor how international organizations influence domestic political outcomes, and to address issues of transparency and accountability within the United Nations, related intergovernmental organizations (IGOs), and other non-state actors." It positions itself not as an ideological foe of NGOs—it was founded by two NGOs—but as a resource to monitor NGO advocacy and encourage non-governmental organizations to embrace the same standards of disclosure and accountability that they demand from governments and corporations. It states: "NGOs have positioned themselves as advocates of global governance and shapers of corporate and government policy. NGOWatch monitors these monitors to encourage transparency and accountability."

The American Enterprise Institute (AEI) and the Federalist Society launched www.ngowatch.org in June 2003 to monitor what the organizations deemed as NGOs that had strayed from their original mandates and become too powerful. AEI held a conference on June 11 on the dangers of rising NGO power to publicly launch the website.

== Staff ==
Jon Entine, a visiting scholar (since 2002) at the American Enterprise Institute, is the supervising editor of NGOWatch. He is an author and journalist, a columnist (since 2001) for the British-based international magazine Ethical Corporation [2] and a consultant focusing on strategic communications, sustainability, and corporate responsibility. David Peyton, a research assistant at AEI, is the program manager of NGOWatch.

== Reception ==
Before the original NGOWatch went defunct in 2007, the website Private Eye criticized it as "a subtle attack on the United Nations ... and ... on civil society itself.".

Political figure Ralph Nader objected to the creation of NGOWatch as a politically motivated effort to go after liberal or progressive NGOs.

== Conferences Sponsored by NGOWatch/Global Governance Watch ==
- Science and Technology in the Balance? Food Security, Precaution, and the Pesticide Debate American Enterprise Institute, 2009-10-06.
- Corporate Responsibility in an Era of New Internationalism American Enterprise Institute, 2008-12-14.
