= Laura Rosenberger =

American diplomat (born 1979)

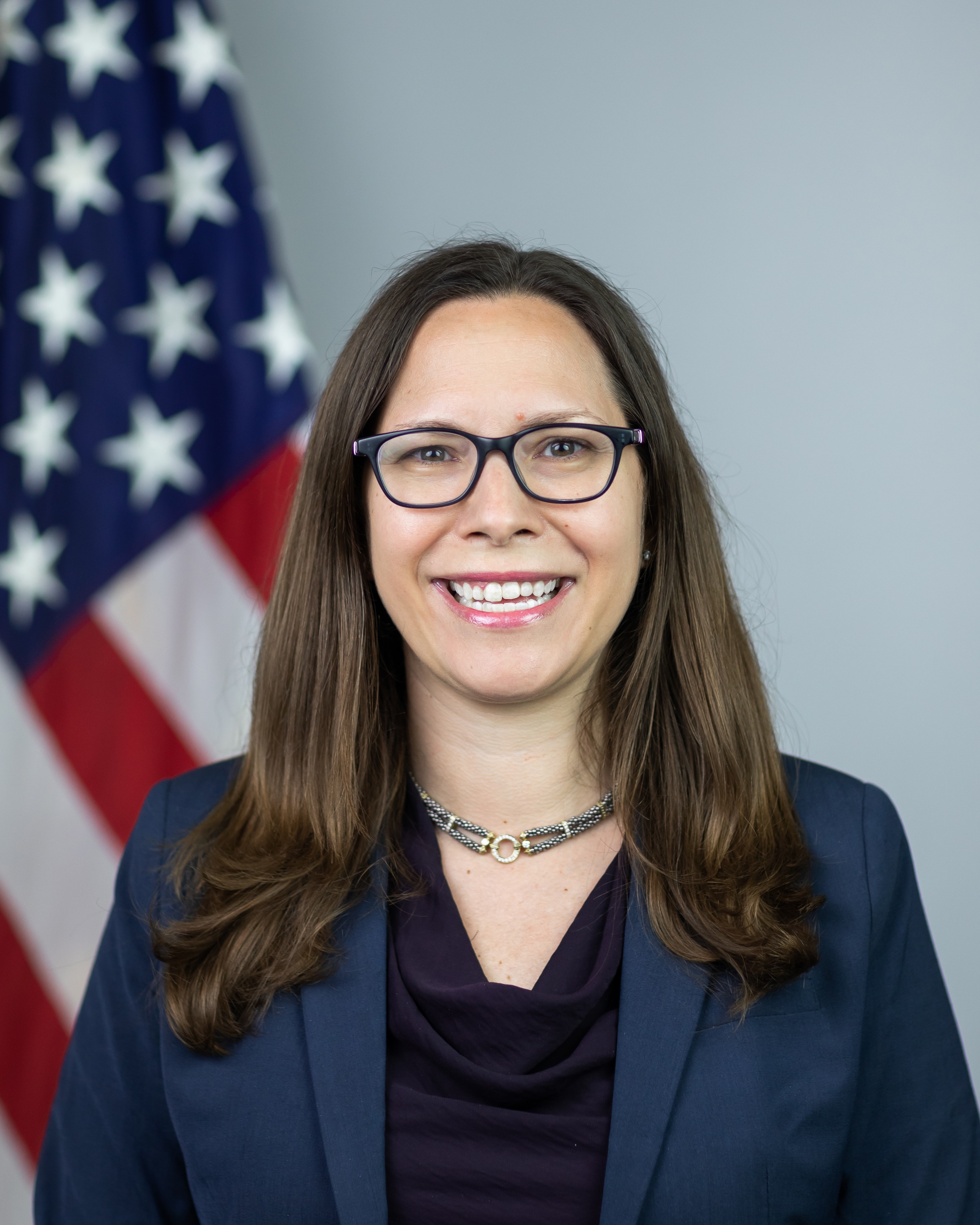

Chair of the American Institute in Taiwan
- In office March 2023 – January 21, 2025
- President: Joe Biden
- Preceded by: James F. Moriarty

Personal details
- Born: 1979 (age 46–47)
- Parents: Bryan Rosenberger (father); Barbara Rosenberger (mother)
- Education: Pennsylvania State University (BA); American University (MA)
- Occupation: Diplomat

Laura Rosenberger (born in 1979) is a former American diplomat. She served as Special Assistant to the President and Senior Director for China and Taiwan at the National Security Council in the Biden administration. She also was chair of the American Institute in Taiwan.

== Early life and education ==
Rosenberger received BAs in Sociology, Psychology, and Women's Studies from Pennsylvania State University's Schreyer Honors College in 2002 and an MA in International Peace and Conflict Resolution from American University School of International Service in 2004. Rosenberger's father Bryan Rosenberger noted in an interview with The Times of Israel that the September 11 attacks inspired her to pursue graduate studies in international peace, which marked the beginning of her policy career.

== Career ==
Rosenberger joined the U.S. Department of State as a Presidential Management Fellow and subsequently served in a variety of roles focused on the Asia-Pacific. Among others, she helped prepare former U.S. President Barack Obama for his first summit with General Secretary of the Chinese Communist Party Xi Jinping.

Rosenberger was appointed chair of the American Institute in Taiwan in March 2023. On April 19, 2023, Rosenberger met with Taiwan's president Tsai Ing-wen. Her tenure at the American Institute in Taiwan ended on January 21, 2025, as Donald Trump began his second presidential term.

== Publications ==
=== Reports ===
- Linking Values and Strategy: How Democracies Can Offset Autocratic Advances, Alliance for Securing Democracy, October 30, 2020 (co-authored with Jessica Brandt, Zack Cooper, and Bradley Hanlon)

=== Articles ===
- Democratic Values Are a Competitive Advantage, Foreign Affairs, December 22, 2020 (co-authored with Zack Cooper)
- The Real Threat of Foreign Interference Comes After Election Day, Foreign Affairs, October 26, 2020
- China's Coronavirus Information Offensive, Foreign Affairs, April 27, 2020
- Making Cyberspace Safe for Democracy, Foreign Affairs, May/June 2020
- The Mueller Report Shows Politicians Must Unite to Fight Election Interference, Foreign Affairs, April 22, 2019 (co-authored with Jamie M. Fly)
- How Silicon Valley Can Protect U.S. Democracy, Foreign Affairs, February 22, 2018 (co-authored with Jamie M. Fly)
- Did Rex Tillerson Misspeak or Intentionally Kowtow to China? Foreign Policy, March 22, 2017
- Can the U.S.-Japan Alliance Survive Trump? Foreign Policy, February 9, 2017
- Career Officials: You Are the Last Line of Defense Against Trump, Foreign Policy, January 30, 2017
