= Charles M. Seeger =

American lawyer

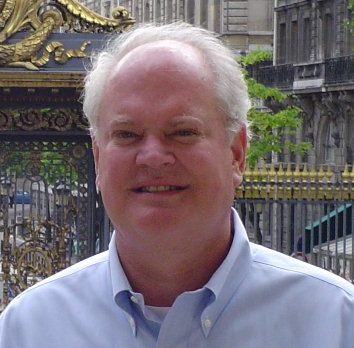
- Born: August 24, 1948 (age 78)
- Education: Johns Hopkins University
- Organization: Financial Markets International
- Website: http://www.fmi-inc.net/

Charles Morgan Seeger III (born 1948) is an American attorney, author, and international derivatives and financial markets expert. Since 1992, Mr. Seeger serves as president and CEO of Financial Markets International, Inc., (FMI) a law and economic consulting firm.

Seeger specializes in economic development in emerging markets, advising financial sector regulators on transparency, enforcement, and market-based international best practices. He has written extensively on capital market development, FX risk management, and the requisite market regulatory oversight. He has been an advocate for economic reform in developing nations for two decades.

== Personal life ==
=== Early years ===
Charles Seeger (Chip) was born in Cincinnati, Ohio, to Helen E. Bates and Charles Morgan Seeger Jr. (West Point 1945). His family transferred frequently among Air Force bases and the Pentagon. Seeger finished high school at Travis Air Force Base, California, and was inducted into the U.S. Scholastic Football Hall of Fame as a “Scholar-Athlete.” In 1966, Seeger was awarded appointments to all three United States military academies, and attended the U.S. Naval Academy for two years and transferred to Johns Hopkins University (BA 1970).

=== Today ===
Seeger has three sons: Charles Morgan Seeger IV (West Point 1995), Christopher S. Seeger (UVA 1997) and Randall Lynes Seeger (Johns Hopkins 2016; Antonin Scalia Law School at George Mason University 2019). He is married to Arline Michelle (Sheehan) Seeger (lawyer, former executive director of the National Lime Association) and lives in Washington, D.C., and Naples, Florida.

== Career ==
Seeger began his career in Washington, D.C., as the legislative assistant to Congressman Charles Teague (R-CA), Ranking Republican on the U.S. House Agriculture Committee, and then served as a budget analyst for the U.S. House Appropriations Committee. In 1976 he ran for the Republican nomination to Congress against the incumbent Republican member (PA-23) and narrowly lost.

Seeger obtained his J.D. degree from Catholic University Law School (1977) and began private practice. Notable clients included: Salomon Brothers, North Carolina National Bank (now Bank of America), Mutual Benefit Insurance Company, Twenty First Securities, and the Chicago Mercantile Exchange. Seeger reported to CME president Clayton Yeutter and CME Chairman Leo Melamed.

In 1986, Seeger joined the CME as senior vice president and government counsel, and developed the American Coalition for Flexible Exchange Rates (ACFX) under the leadership of Nobel Laureate, Milton Friedman, and Leo Melamed. After the stock market crash on October 19, 1987 (Black Monday) Seeger provided research assistance to Merton Miller (Nobel Laureate Economics 1990) who authored the seminal report on the causes of the market crash and regulatory remedies. In 1992, Seeger led the strategic development of the Budapest Commodity Exchange for the U.S. State Department, Trade and Development Program, with the CME and Chicago Board of Trade. Seeger founded Financial Markets International, Inc, in November 1992, and has served as president and CEO since its inception. He was an adjunct professor at Virginia Tech University teaching graduate-level comparative international financial regulatory policy. Seeger directs the FMI economic development projects that are competitively awarded from USAID, World Bank, and other international donor agencies.

== Bibliography ==
Seeger has written extensively about capital markets development. Selected works include:

- Derivatives Today: A Primer (Irwin Publishing. 1994). Used in the curriculum at Stanford Law School. ISBN 0-7863-0458-8
- India’s Commodity Transaction Tax: Economic Consequences and International Lessons Learned (USAID. April 2013)
- India’s Commodity Folly (Wall Street Journal. April 18, 2013)
- Approaches for the National Bank of Ukraine to Facilitate Foreign Currency Risk Management (USAID August 2011)
- Competition Reaffirmed (Business Standard India. August 6, 2011)
- Capital Markets Development in Ukraine 1996-2010: Central Securities Depository (USAID Kiev/Washington, D.C. January 2011)
- Regulatory Capture or Fair Competition? (SME Times. February 11, 2009)
- Fair Competition for India (SME Times. December 30, 2008)
- Moon Shots and Currency Risk Management (SME Times. December 6, 2008)
- Ukraine Financial Sector Review (USAID. May 2004)
- Financial Markets Development in Ukraine (Social Sciences Research Press. January 2000)
- Investing in Emerging Markets: The Fundamental Requisites (The Journal of Investment Consulting. December 1998)
- Derivatives: A Board Briefing (The Corporate Board. May 1994)
- Market Squabbles: SEC v. CFTC (Cato Institute. June 1990)
- The Development of Congressional Concerns About Financial Futures Markets (American Enterprise Institute. 1985)
- Political Contributions are Free Speech (American Bar Association Journal. December 1980)
- How to Prevent Future Nick Leesons (Wall Street Journal. August 8, 1995)
- Lessons of the Crash of 1987 (Economic Affairs. February 1989)
