= Ravenel B. Curry III =

American businessman and philanthropist

Ravenel B. Curry III is an American businessman and philanthropist.

== Early life and education ==
Ravenel, a native of Greenwood, South Carolina, graduated from Furman University in 1963.

== Career ==
Curry began his investment career as a security analyst at Morgan Guaranty Trust Company. He was also partner at H.C. Wainwright as well as a Portfolio Manager of The Duke Endowment. Curry is currently the President and CIO of Eagle Capital Management, an investment management firm headquartered in New York City which he co-Founded with his late wife Beth Curry in 1988.

== Philanthropy ==
He sits on the Board of Trustees of the American Enterprise Institute, the Manhattan Institute for Policy Research, The Duke Endowment, the New York Hall of Science, the New-York Historical Society, the Genetics Endowment of South Carolina, the Blanton-Peale Institute (named for Norman Vincent Peale), and his alma mater, Furman University. He has previously served as President of the Furman University Alumni Board and as Chair of the New Jersey Higher Education Assistance Authority. He is a Trustee Emeritus of Success Academy and a member of the Council on Foreign Relations.

In 2004, he donated US$1 million to support the Chinese Studies program at Furman University, and, in 2023, he donated US$10 million to support the renovation of Furman University's basketball arena.

He and Beth Curry founded the Ravenel and Elizabeth Curry Foundation, which made major contributions to Rockefeller University, Weill Cornell Medical College and Queens University of Charlotte, N.C.

== Personal life ==
He married Elizabeth Rivers Curry (née Mary Elizabeth Rivers) (1941-2015) in 1963.

In 2017, Curry was awarded the Manhattan Institute's Alexander Hamilton Award.
