= John H. Makin =

John Holmes Makin (May 29, 1943 – March 30, 2015) was an American economist and resident scholar at the American Enterprise Institute. He was a consultant to the U.S. Treasury Department, the Congressional Budget Office, the International Monetary Fund, and the Bank of Japan. He specialized in international finance and financial markets, with special emphasis on both Japanese and European economies. Makin reported on the U.S. economy, writing on topics related to monetary policy, tax and budget issues, in monthly essays entitled "Economic Outlook", for the American Enterprise Institute (AEI). He was a principal at Caxton Associates from 1995 to 2010 before returning to AEI.

== Early life and education ==
Makin earned a PhD in economics from the University of Chicago after writing a dissertation on the risk involved in the composition of international reserve holdings. For the next decade, he held various positions at several research universities, including the University of Wisconsin–Milwaukee, the University of Virginia, and the University of British Columbia. During this time, he also held research appointments at the Federal Reserve Banks of Chicago and San Francisco.

== Career ==
In 1978 he was named the director of the Institute for Economic Research at the University of Washington, a post he held for six years. Makin frequently commented on national and international policy debates, serving as a consultant to the International Monetary Fund and the US Treasury, and holding a post as a research associate at the National Bureau of Economic Research. It was during this time that he also established his long-running relationship with the American Enterprise Institute (AEI).

After serving as a member of the Panel of Economic Advisers for the Congressional Budget Office for a decade, holding a post at AEI, and consulting for the Bank of Japan, Makin moved from academia into financial markets, working closely with Caxton Associates for two decades. During Makin's time as chief economist at Caxton Associates, the fund returned, on average, 21 percent per year, one of the best rates of return in the industry. In 2010, Makin returned to the AEI.

Makin wrote a monthly economics newsletter called the Economic Outlook for many years.

== Bibliography ==
- John H. Makin (1984). The global debt crisis: America's growing involvement. Basic Books. ISBN 978-0-465-02681-4.
- John H. Makin (1986). U.S. fiscal policy: its effects at home and abroad. American Enterprise Institute for Public Policy Research. ISBN 978-0-8447-3608-2.
- John H. Makin; Norman J. Ornstein (1990). Balancing act: debt, deficits, and taxes. AEI Press. ISBN 978-0-8447-3740-9.
