= Aaron Friedberg =

American political scientist (born 1956)

Aaron L. Friedberg
- Born: April 16, 1956 (age 70); Pittsburgh, PA
- Organizations: Princeton School of Public and International Affairs

Academic background
- Education: Harvard University (AB, PhD)

Academic work
- Institutions: Princeton University
- Main interests: Political science; International relations; Chinese foreign policy

Chinese name
- Traditional Chinese: 范亞倫
- Simplified Chinese: 范亚伦
Transcriptions
Standard Mandarin
- Hanyu Pinyin: Fàn Yàlún

Aaron Louis Friedberg (born April 16, 1956) is an American political scientist currently serving as the Professor of Politics and International Affairs at Princeton University.

Friedberg served from 2003 to 2005 in the office of the Vice President of the United States as deputy assistant for national-security affairs and director of policy planning.

After receiving his PhD in government from Harvard University, Friedberg joined the Princeton University faculty in 1987 and was appointed professor of politics and international affairs in 1999. He has served as Director of Princeton's Research Program in International Security at the School of Public and International Affairs, and is the acting director of the Center of International Studies at Princeton. Friedberg is a former fellow at the Smithsonian Institution’s Woodrow Wilson International Center for Scholars, the Norwegian Nobel Institute, and Harvard University’s Center for International Affairs. He also serves as Chairman of the Board of Counselors for the National Bureau of Asian Research's Pyle Center for Northeast Asian Studies.

In September 2001, Friedberg began a nine-month residential appointment as the first Henry Alfred Kissinger Scholar at the Library of Congress. During his tenure he researched "the rise of Asia and its implications for America." Apart from many articles for Commentary magazine, Friedberg has written several books on foreign relations.

He was one of the signers of the Project for the New American Century (PNAC) documents Statement of Principles (June 3, 1997) and a letter on terrorism submitted to President George W. Bush (September 20, 2001). His name has been connected to the Aspen Strategy Group at the Aspen Institute.

Friedberg represented the Romney campaign in his capacity as the campaign's National Security Advisor during a debate on US policy toward China in October 2012.

In 2020, Friedberg, along with over 130 other former Republican national security officials, signed a statement that asserted that President Trump was unfit to serve another term, and "To that end, we are firmly convinced that it is in the best interest of our nation that Vice President Joe Biden be elected as the next President of the United States, and we will vote for him."

Friedberg co-founded the Alexander Hamilton Society, a non-partisan membership organization based in DC, along with Dan Blumenthal and Roy Katzovicz in March 2010. He continues to serve on its board of directors.

== International relations philosophy ==
Although Friedberg's international relations philosophy is rooted in concern for the structural organization of power characteristic of the realist school of international relations, his scholarship also incorporates theoretical insights from other international relations traditions, including liberal institutionalism and constructivism. Friedberg's stance has been described by fellow scholar Thomas Christensen as a ‘positive-sum’ approach to international relations. Hence, unlike more pessimistic realist scholars, Friedberg, in a seminal article published in International Security in 1993, advocated continued U.S. engagement in East Asia to serve as a stabilizing force until regional economic integration and multilateral institutions had time to develop. Thus, in contrast to traditional realpolitik scholars, Friedberg believes that conflict is not inevitable in East Asia as China continues to develop as long as multilateral institutions and economic integration are used as tools to manage security dilemmas. Since the 2010s, however, Friedberg has adopted a more sceptical assessment of China's foreign policy posture, increasingly foregrounding Beijing's revisionist ambitions and characterising it as a major geostrategic competitor to the United States.

== Publications ==
=== Books ===
- The Weary Titan: Britain and The Experience of Relative Decline, 1895–1905 (Princeton University Press, 1988)
- In the Shadow of the Garrison State: America's Anti-Statism and Its Cold War Grand Strategy (Princeton University Press, 2000)
- A Contest for Supremacy: China, America, and the Struggle for Mastery in Asia (W. W. Norton & Company, 2011)
- Beyond Air-Sea Battle: The Debate Over US Military Strategy in Asia (Routledge, 2014)
- Getting China Wrong (Polity, 2022)

=== Articles ===
Six Lessons from a Decade of Asia Strategy Simulations, German Marshall Fund, June 22, 2022
