= Robert Goldwin =

American political scientist (1922–2010)

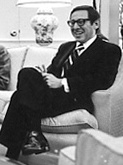
- White House Special Consultant Robert Goldwin, 1974
- Born: April 16, 1922; New York City, New York, U.S.
- Died: January 12, 2010 (aged 87)
- Occupation: Political scientist
- Military career
- Branch: U.S. Army
- Conflicts: World War II

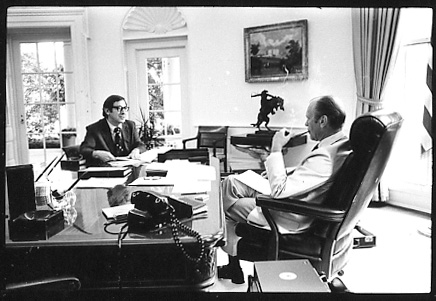
Goldwin and President Ford in the Oval Office, 1975 (courtesy Gerald R. Ford Library)

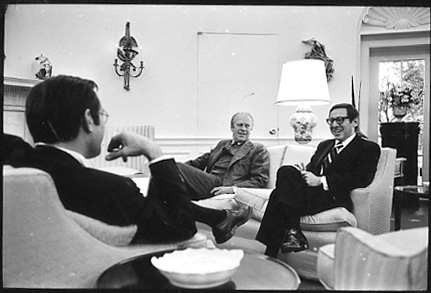
Rumsfeld, Ford, Goldwin, and Irving Kristol (not shown) chatting in the Oval Office. (courtesy Gerald R. Ford Library)

Robert Allen Goldwin (April 16, 1922 – January 12, 2010) was an American political scientist specializing in the study of the Constitution, who left academia to enter government at the invitation of his friend Donald Rumsfeld, serving as adviser and "intellectual-in-residence" for the presidential administration of Gerald Ford. He was subsequently a scholar at the American Enterprise Institute.

== Early life and education ==
Goldwin was born in New York City to restaurateurs, and served in the United States Army during World War II. He performed undergraduate studies at St. John's College in Annapolis, Maryland, graduating in 1950.

Goldwin was a student of Leo Strauss at the University of Chicago, attaining his PhD in 1963 but continuing as lecturer there until 1966. It was there that he became friends with Donald Rumsfeld. He was awarded a Guggenheim Fellowship in 1966, and he subsequently taught at Kenyon College in Ohio and became Dean at St. John's College.

== Career ==
Goldwin entered government at the invitation of then United States Ambassador to NATO Donald Rumsfeld, working initially as a special adviser. When Rumsfeld became White House Chief of Staff, Goldwin followed him. At the White House, Goldwin organized dinners with intellectuals for the president and conducted seminars in the solarium.

Following his time in government, Goldwin became a resident scholar at the American Enterprise Institute, where he wrote extensively on the constitution. He remained interested in current affairs, inviting political figures to seminars. He was credited by Rumsfeld with a significant contributions to ongoing public debates, including the Law of the Sea treaty and the drafting of a constitution for Iraq in 2003.

== Bibliography ==
- From Parchment to Power, AEI Press, January 1998
- After the People Vote, AEI Press, March 1992
- The Spirit of the Constitution, AEI Press, July 1990
- Foreign Policy and the Constitution, AEI Press, March 1990.
- Why Blacks, Women, and Jews Are Not Mentioned in the Constitution, and Other Unorthodox Views, AEI Press, January 1990.
- Forging Unity out of Diversity, AEI Press, May 1989
- Constitution Makers on Constitution Making, Rowman & Littlefield, December 1988
- The Constitution, the Courts, and the Quest for Justice, AEI Press, December 1988
- Slavery and Its Consequences, AEI Press, August 1988
- Constitutional Controversies, AEI Press, December 1987
- How Does the Constitution Protect Religious Freedom? AEI Press, February 1987
- Separation of Powers, AEI Press, September 1986
- How Federal Is the Constitution? AEI Press, February 1986
- How Does the Constitution Secure Rights? AEI Press, January 1985
- How Capitalistic Is the Constitution? AEI Press, August 1982
- The Government's Role in Solving Societal Problems, Associated Faculty Press, Incorporated, January 1982
- Bureaucrats, Policy Analysts, Statesmen, AEI Press, January 1980
- How Democratic Is the Constitution? AEI Press, January 1980
- Political Parties in the 1980s, AEI Press, January 1980
- Beyond the Cold War, Ayer Co Pub, June 1979
- A Nation of States, Houghton Mifflin Company, May 1976
- Readings in Russian Foreign Policy, Oxford University Press, January 1970
