= Michael R. Strain =

American economist

Michael Strain
- Strain walks with Federal Reserve Chair Kevin Walsh at the Kansas City Fed's annual symposium in Wyoming in 2026.

Personal details
- Party: Republican
- Education: Marquette University (BA); New York University (MA); Cornell University (PhD)

Michael R. Strain is an American economist. He is currently the Director of Economic Policy Studies and the Paul F. Oreffice Senior Fellow in Political Economy at the American Enterprise Institute. He is also Professor of Practice in the McCourt School of Public Policy at Georgetown University, a research fellow at the IZA Institute of Labor Economics, a contributing columnist for the Financial Times, and a member of the American Academy of Arts and Sciences. Strain's research focuses on labor economics, macroeconomics, public finance, and social policy.

== Education and career ==
Strain graduated from Rockhurst High School in Kansas City, Missouri, before attending Marquette University and graduating magna cum laude.

Strain holds a Ph.D. in economics from Cornell University. In 2005, he joined the Federal Reserve Bank of New York as an assistant economist until 2008 when he joined the Center for Economic Studies at the US Census Bureau. While still working at the US Census Bureau, he took up the job of administrator at the New York Census Research Data Centers in 2011.

In 2012, Strain left the Census Bureau and joined the American Enterprise Institute as a Research Fellow and later became the deputy director of Economic Policy Studies at the institute in 2015. Since becoming AEI's Director of Economic Policy in 2016, Strain leads the work of the institute in the economic policy, financial markets, and health care policy.

He is the editor of The US Labor Market: Questions and Challenges for Public Policy He co-edited, with Stan Veuger, the Economic Freedom and Human Flourishing: Perspectives from Political Philosophy. He is the co-editor of three books: What Has Happened to the American Working Class since the Great Recession?, The US Labor Market: Questions and Challenges for Public Policy, and Economic Freedom and Human Flourishing: Perspectives from Political Philosophy.

Strain has published research articles on the Paycheck Protection Program, fiscal and monetary policy following the 2008 financial crisis, the Earned Income Tax Credit, the gender pay gap, the effects of minimum wage laws and unemployment insurance, the Affordable Care Act, "wage theft" and payday lending, increasing employment, the "socially optimal" top marginal income tax rate, worksharing unemployment insurance programs, the effects of job loss, and the federal budget.

In 2013, National Review's Reihan Salam described him as the "most important conservative reformer, and the one who could have the biggest beneficial impact on the well-being of Americans struggling to climb the economic ladder." He was featured in a 2014 New York Times Magazine cover story as one of the main intellectuals in the reform conservative movement. He contributed a chapter to Room to Grow: Conservative Reforms for a Limited Government and a Thriving Middle Class, a reform conservative manifesto that New York Times columnist David Brooks called "the most coherent and compelling policy agenda the American right has produced this century." He was identified by Karl Rove in 2014 as one of the new "conservative reformers." In 2021 his work was cited by The Economist magazine as contributing “to an intellectual revolution in macroeconomics."

Strain's work on the economic policy response to the COVID-19 pandemic, employment, anti-poverty and upward mobility issues, and economic opportunity has been featured or profiled in many publications, including The New York Times, The Atlantic, and National Review, among others. Strain was cited by The New York Times, The Wall Street Journal, and The Washington Post as being among the first economists to warn that President Biden's stimulus plans could spark inflation. He is a regular guest on major media outlets, including CNBC, MSNBC, and Marketplace Radio. He has testified before Congress and speaks often to a variety of audiences.

In January 2020, Strain published The American Dream is Not Dead: (But Populism Could Kill It), in which he writes that despite popular conceptions about long-term economic stagnation, America is still broadly characterized by upward mobility. Strain argues that when measured properly, wages and incomes have risen over the past several decades. Thus, contrary to what populist politicians and commentators of both parties often say, America's economic system is not “rigged.”

The book received mostly positive reviews. Washington Post columnist George Will praised the book as "an inoculation against politically motivated misinformation." Former House speaker Paul Ryan wrote: "Without glossing over the real challenges that too many Americans face, Michael Strain makes a persuasive case that the American dream remains alive and well." Lawrence Summers, the former Treasury secretary, described the book as "a welcome antidote to the pervasive pessimism surrounding economic policy debates." Robert Verbruggen in National Review wrote he had "one criticism of the book more broadly: There isn't a whole lot here about how 'populism could kill' the American Dream," but said the book would be "a good gift for that pessimistic reactionary down the street."

Strain was elected to the American Academy of Arts and Sciences in 2026.

== Personal life ==
Strain is Catholic. Strain and his wife have two children.

== Selected publications ==
=== Books ===
- The US Labor Market: Questions and Challenges for Public Policy (2016). ISBN 978-0844750071
- Economic Freedom and Human Flourishing: Perspectives from Political Philosophy (2016). ISBN 978-0844750019
- The American Dream Is Not Dead: (But Populism Could Kill It) (2020) ISBN 978-1599475578

=== Papers ===
- High School Experiences, the Gender Wage Gap, and the Selection of Occupation, Applied Economics, vol. 49, no. 49, 2017.
- Do Minimum Wage Increases Influence Worker Health?, Economic Inquiry, vol. 55, no. 4, 2017.
- Has the Affordable Care Act increased part-time employment?, Applied Economics Letters, vol. 23, no. 3, 2016.
- A Jobs Agenda for the Right, National Affairs, no. 18, winter 2014.
