= New Atlantic Initiative =

Defunct arm of the American Enterprise Institute

The New Atlantic Initiative (NAI) was an international nonpartisan organization dedicated to revitalizing and expanding the Atlantic community of democracies. NAI was based at the American Enterprise Institute, a Washington, DC–based think tank.

The NAI's central objective was to strengthen Atlantic cooperation in the post-Cold War world by bringing together Americans and Europeans to work toward common goals, including:

- The reinvigoration of Atlantic institutions of political cooperation and consultation.
- The admission of Europe's fledgling democracies into the institutions of Atlantic defense and European economic cooperation, notably NATO and the European Union.
- The establishment of free trade between an enlarged European Union and the North American Free Trade Agreement (NAFTA) countries as a complement to strengthening global free trade.

The NAI also sponsored conferences, debates, and roundtable discussions in the U.S., Europe and elsewhere.

In 2005 NAI was shut down and merged into the "European Studies" program at AEI.
