= Mark Falcoff =

American scholar and policy consultant

Mark Falcoff (/ˈfækɒf/; born 1941) is an American scholar and policy consultant who has worked with a number of think tanks, such as the American Enterprise Institute (AEI), the Hoover Institution, and the Council on Foreign Relations.

== Education and career ==
Falcoff earned a B.A. in political science from the University of Missouri in 1963, and would later earn a Ph.D. and M.A. at Princeton University. He served as a consultant and staff member on a number of important committees and commissions, including the 1983 National Bipartisan Commission on Central America and the Senate Committee on Foreign Relations. He has taught at the University of Illinois and the University of Oregon and lectured at several universities.

The focus of Falcoff's work is Latin America and related US policies. He has authored numerous publication on subjects ranging from the causes of the Juan Perón period of Argentine politics to the controversial US handover of the Panama Canal to Panama. Many of his books are published in conjunction with AEI; the latest of these is Cuba the Morning After: Confronting Castro's Legacy, which attempts to challenge common assumptions pertaining to Cuba-United States relations and the impact on Cuba of Fidel Castro's eventual demise.

In a 2003 article for Commentary, Falcoff defended former Secretary of State Henry Kissinger (who served as the head of the 1983 commission on Central America which Falcoff consulted) against claims, most notably made by Christopher Hitchens in The Trial of Henry Kissinger, that Kissinger, as the US Secretary of State, was the chief architect for the Chilean coup of 1973, and subsequent atrocities committed by the forces of President Augusto Pinochet.

Falcoff's articles have appeared in a number of influential newspapers and academic journals, such as The Washington Post, The New Republic, and Foreign Affairs. He is a Resident Scholar Emeritus of the AEI.

== Works ==
- Prologue to Peron: Argentina in Depression and War, 1930–1943, 1976.
- The Spanish Civil War, 1936–1939: American Hemispheric Perspectives, 1982.
- Small Countries, Large Issues, 1984.
- The Continuing Crisis: U.S. Policy in Central America and the Caribbean, co-editor Robert Royal, 1987.
- Chile: Prospects for Democracy, co-authors Susan K. Purcell, Arturo Valenzuela, Council on Foreign Relations Press, 1988.
- A Tale of Two Policies: U.S. Relations with the Argentine Junta, 1976–1983, 1989.
- Modern Chile: A Critical History, 1989.
- Latin America after the Cold War: Implications for U.S. Policy, co-authors Douglas Payne, Susan K. Purcell, 1991.
- Searching for Panama: The U.S.-Panama Relationship and Democratization, co-author Richard L. Millett, 1993.
- A Culture of Its Own: Taking Latin America Seriously, 1998.
- Panama's Canal: What Happens When the United States Gives a Small Country What it Wants, 2000. A PDF version is available at AEI's website.
- The Cuban Revolution and the United States: A History in Documents, 1958–1960, 2001.
- Cuba the Morning After: Confronting Castro's Legacy, 2003.
