= Desmond Lachman =

South African economist

- Born: 1948; South Africa

Academic background
- Education: University of the Witwatersrand; Cambridge University (PhD)
- Website: Desmond Lachman; Information at IDEAS / RePEc

Desmond Lachman (born 1948), is a South African-born economist and finance author, who was a senior advisor (1984–1994) and then Deputy Director (1994–1996) at the International Monetary Fund, the Managing Director and Chief Emerging Market Strategist at Salomon Smith Barney (1996–2003), and a Fellow at the American Enterprise Institute (2003–). Lachman has served as an adjunct professor at Johns Hopkins University (2009), and Georgetown University (2010).

In 2006, Paul Blustein of the Wall Street Journal said Lachman "distinguished himself amongst other analysts" in predicting that Argentina would be eventually forced to default on its debts. In 2011, Bloomberg credited Lachman with predicting the global credit crisis and the credit issues that the Euro currency would create amongst some member states. In 2016, Blustein said "Some of his direct forecasts have proven perspicacious and have come well ahead of the pack".

Lachman is a frequent opinion contributor in the main financial media, including the Financial Times, The Wall Street Journal, and Bloomberg, as well as for the wider national media such as for The Hill, for U.S. News, for Fox News, and for CNN.

He is also regularly interviewed for his views on emerging markets in the financial media, such as in Barron's, CNBC, and the Economist. Lachman is interviewed on general economics for the wider non-financial national media such as for USA Today, for BBC News, and for NPR.

In 2011, BBC's Newsnight, named Lachman's graph of 10-year euro yields as their "Chart of the Year", from submissions by leading economists.

== Published works ==
- Lachman, Desmond; Ramaswamy, Ramana; Green, J. H.; Hagemann, Robert P.; Bennett, Adam (1995). Challenges to the Swedish Welfare State. International Monetary Fund. ISBN 9781452727783.
- Lachman, Desmond; Bercuson, Kenneth (1992). Economic Policies for a New South Africa. International Monetary Fund. ISBN 9781557751980.

== See also ==
- Argentine debt restructuring
- Everything bubble
- Greek government-debt crisis
