= Arthur C. Brooks =

American author and academic (born 1964)

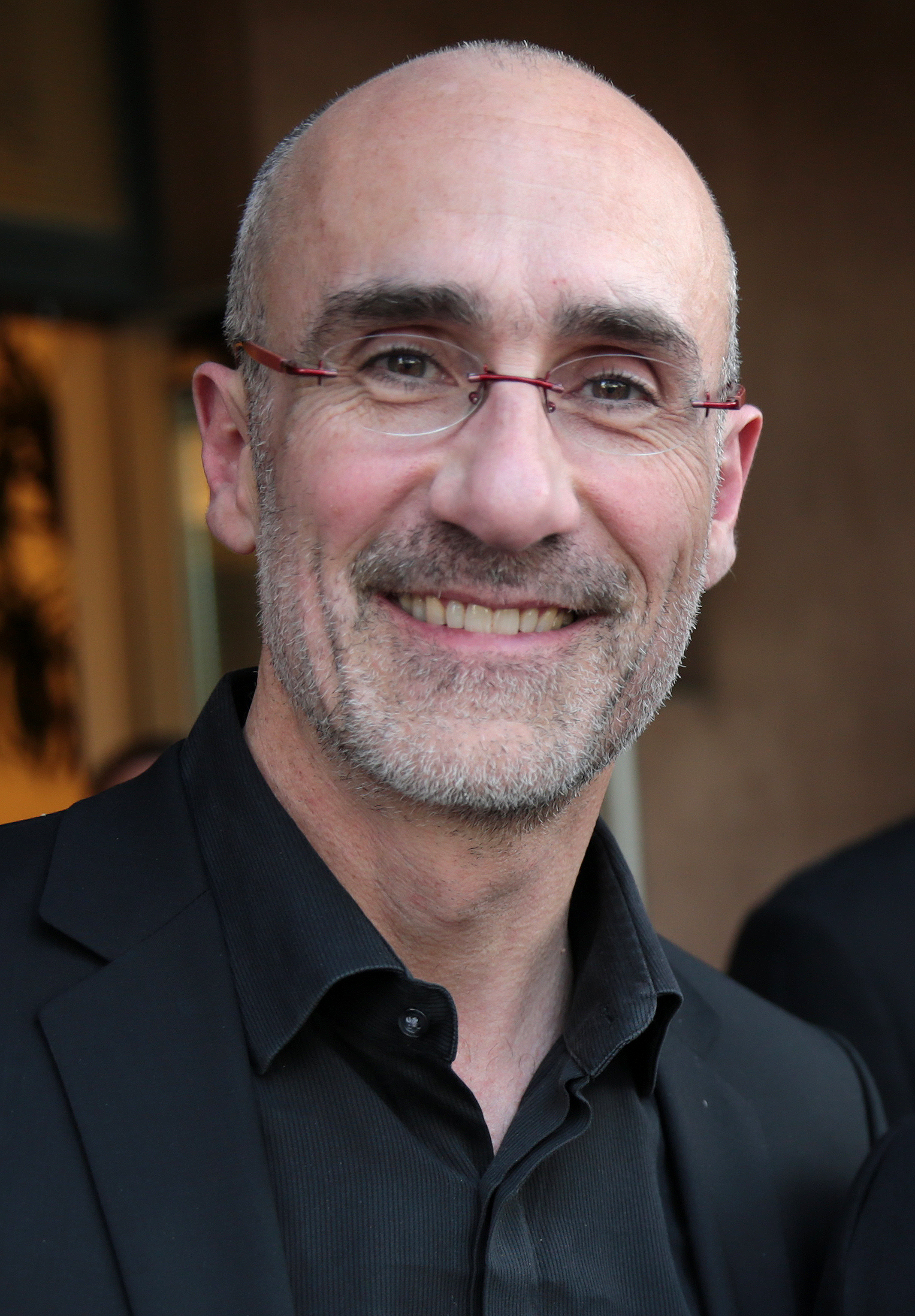
- Born: Arthur Charles Brooks; May 21, 1964 (age 62); Spokane, Washington, U.S.

Academic background
- Education: California Institute of the Arts; Thomas Edison State University (BA); Florida Atlantic University (MA); Pardee RAND Graduate School (MPhil, PhD)

Academic work
- Discipline: Social science; Microeconomics; Management
- School or tradition: Neoclassical economics
- Institutions: Vanderbilt University (2026‍–‍present); Harvard University (2019‍–‍present); American Enterprise Institute (2009‍–‍2019); Syracuse University (2001‍–‍2009); Georgia State University (1998‍–‍2000)
- Website: Information at IDEAS / RePEc

Arthur Charles Brooks (born May 21, 1964) is an American author and academic. Brooks is the Kohler Family Professor of Medicine, Health, and Society at Vanderbilt University and a senior fellow at the Harvard Business School. He is a CBS News contributor, columnist with The Free Press, and host of the weekly podcast “Office Hours with Arthur Brooks.”

From 2019 to 2026, Brooks served as the Parker Gilbert Montgomery Professor of the Practice of Nonprofit and Public Leadership at the Harvard Kennedy School and at the Harvard Business School as a professor of management practice and faculty fellow. As of July 1, 2026, he was also named as an endowed professor at Vanderbilt University. Previously, Brooks served as the 11th president of the American Enterprise Institute. He is the author of sixteen books, including The Meaning of Your Life: Finding Purpose in an Age of Emptiness, Build the Life You Want: The Art and Science of Getting Happier with co-author Oprah Winfrey (2023), From Strength to Strength: Finding Success, Happiness and Deep Purpose in the Second Half of Life (2022), Love Your Enemies (2019), The Conservative Heart (2015), and The Road to Freedom (2012). He is a columnist for The Free Press, a CBS News contributor, and host of the podcast Office Hours with Arthur Brooks.

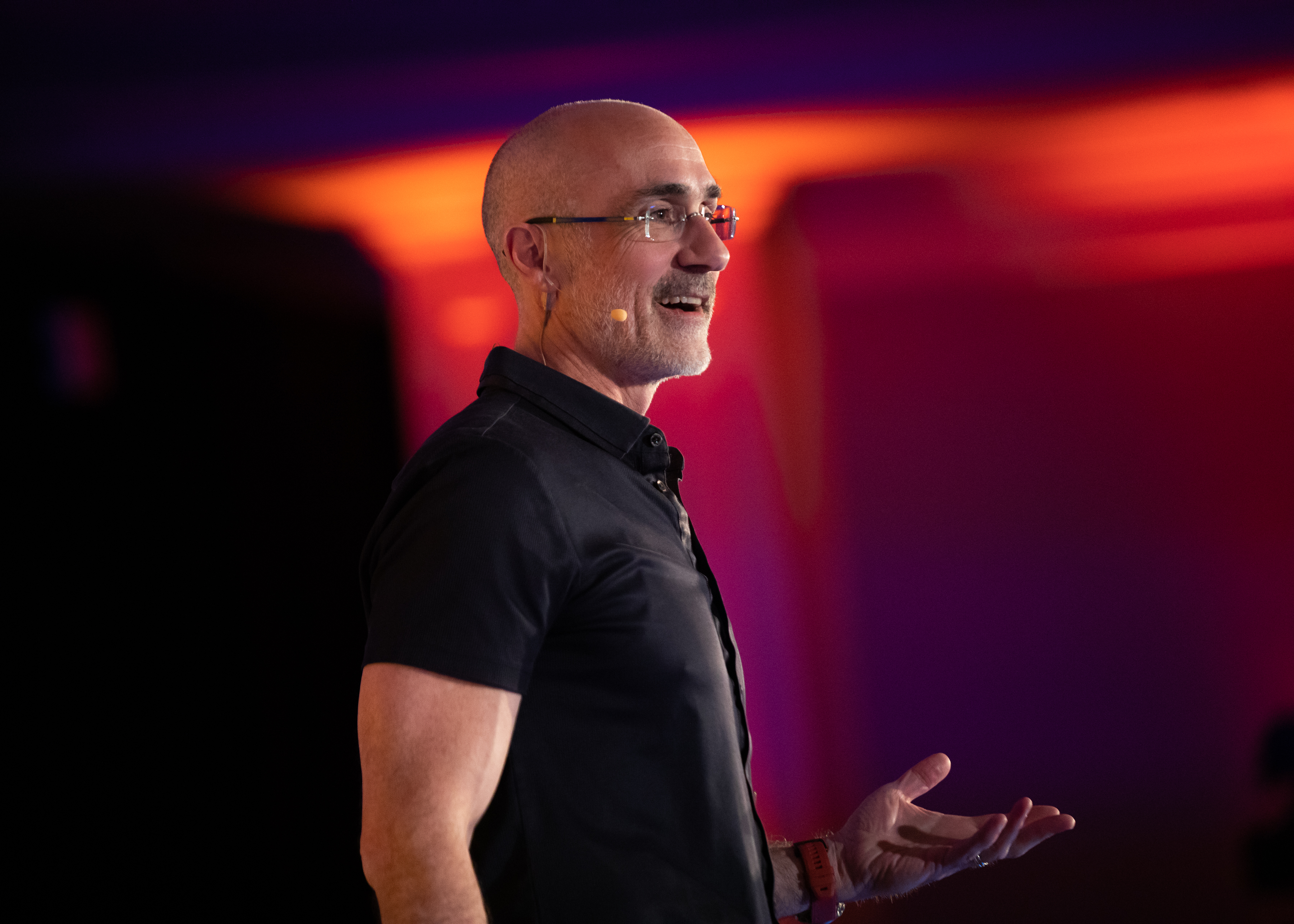
Brooks at The Atlantic's 2022 "In Pursuit of Happiness" Conference

== Early life and education ==
Brooks was born on May 21, 1964, in Spokane, Washington, to David C. Brooks, a mathematics professor, and Jacqueline Brooks, an artist. When he was very young, his family moved to Seattle, where he spent his childhood.

Brooks studied at the California Institute of the Arts, but after being placed on academic probation in his first years and declining an offer to transfer to the Curtis Institute of Music, he left to be a professional French hornist into his early thirties, much of those years being spent with the City Orchestra of Barcelona, Spain.

Brooks returned to school in his late twenties to earn a bachelor’s degree in economics, via distance learning, from Thomas Edison State College.

In 1998, Brooks earned his M.Phil. and Ph.D. in public policy analysis from the RAND Graduate School in Santa Monica, California, while working at the RAND Corporation as a military operations research analyst for Project Air Force.

== Career ==
=== Georgia State University and Syracuse University ===
Brooks began his academic career in 1998 at Georgia State University as an assistant professor of public administration and economics. From 2001 to 2008, he taught at Syracuse University, where he was made a full professor in 2006, and was named the Louis A. Bantle Professor of Business and Government Policy in 2007. He held a joint appointment at the Maxwell School of Citizenship and Public Affairs and the Martin J. Whitman School of Management. During his tenure at Syracuse, Brooks published over 60 peer-reviewed articles and four books.

=== American Enterprise Institute ===
From 2009 to 2019, Brooks served as the 11th president and Beth and Ravenel Curry Scholar in Free Enterprise for the American Enterprise Institute (AEI). In 2018, he announced his resignation from AEI, writing in a Wall Street Journal op-ed that "social enterprises generally thrive best when chief executives don't stay much longer than a decade, because it's important to refresh the organizational vision periodically and avoid becoming uniquely associated with one person."

=== Harvard University ===
Since 2019, Brooks has served as a professor at the Harvard Business School and at the Harvard Kennedy School, where he runs the Leadership & Happiness Laboratory at the Center for Public Leadership. His "Leadership and Happiness" class at Harvard Business School has gained immense popularity and attention in the press.

=== Vanderbilt University ===
In July 2026, Brooks joined the faculty as an endowed professor in the Department of Medicine, Health and Society in the College of Arts and Science. Vanderbilt announced that Brooks will focus on public-facing teaching and engagement and will contribute to executive education programs.

== Books and research ==
=== Love Your Enemies ===
In 2019, Brooks published Love Your Enemies: How Decent People Can Save America from the Culture of Contempt, which he describes as an antidote to the toxic political culture he found in the United States, especially after the 2016 election. With ideas based in behavioral research, ancient philosophy, and his own experience as the president of AEI, Brooks encourages a culture of love and respectful disagreement for political and economic progress and shows how this can be done. Love Your Enemies was a national bestseller and was included in Politico's "Top Books of 2019."

=== From Strength to Strength ===
In February 2022, Brooks published From Strength to Strength: Finding Happiness, Success, and Deep Purpose in the Second Half of Life. Brooks's ideas on happiness research on aging professionals were first introduced to the public in a 2019 Atlantic article, "Your Professional Decline Is Coming (Much) Sooner Than You Think." From Strength to Strength debuted at #1 on the New York Times bestseller list, where it remained for several months. Oprah Winfrey recommended the book, which was also endorsed by the Dalai Lama.

=== Build the Life You Want ===
In September 2023, Brooks, along with co-author Oprah Winfrey, published Build the Life You Want: The Art and Science of Getting Happier, which debuted at #1 on the New York Times bestseller list.

== Research and other media ==
=== Happiness research ===
Brooks began focusing intensively on the study of happiness following his professional move from AEI to Harvard, where he taught classes in happiness, also writing weekly on the subject in The Atlantic. He also began hosting podcasts on happiness such as The Art of Happiness.

=== The Pursuit ===
Brooks was the subject of the 2019 documentary The Pursuit. This film follows Brooks around the world as he searches for answers to issues of global poverty.

== Awards and recognition ==
Brooks has been awarded honorary doctorates from Providence College in 2024, the Catholic University of America in 2023, Saint Thomas Aquinas College in 2020, Brigham Young University in 2019, Claremont McKenna College in 2019, Hampden-Sydney College in 2018, Jacksonville University in 2018, Ave Maria University in 2015, and Thomas Edison State College in 2013.

== Personal life ==
Brooks is married to Ester Munt-Brooks, a native of Barcelona, and they have three children.

Brooks was born into a fervent evangelical family, and converted to Catholicism after a mystical experience of the Virgin Mary while visiting the shrine of Our Lady of Guadalupe in Mexico. He spends an hour and half each day in prayer: Mass, rosary and a half hour "mystical conversation."

== Published works ==
- McCarthy, Kevin F.; Arthur C. Brooks; Julia Lowell & Laura Zakaras (2001). The Performing Arts in a New Era. Santa Monica, California: Rand Corporation. ISBN 0833030418.
- Kevin F. McCarthy, Elizabeth H. Ondaatje, Laura Zakaras, and Arthur C. Brooks. Gifts of the Muse: Reframing the Debate about the Benefits of the Arts. Santa Monica, California.: Rand Corporation, 2004. (ISBN 0833036947)
- Arthur C. Brooks, ed. Gifts of Time and Money: The Role of Charity in America's Communities. Lanham, Maryland.: Rowman & Littlefield, 2005. (ISBN 0742545059)
- Kevin F. McCarthy, Elizabeth H. Ondaatje, Arthur C. Brooks, and Andras Szanto. A Portrait of the Visual Arts: Meeting the Challenges of a New Era. Santa Monica, California.: Rand Corporation, 2005. (ISBN 0833037935)
- Arthur C. Brooks. Who Really Cares: The Surprising Truth About Compassionate Conservatism. New York, New York: Basic Books, 2006. (ISBN 978-0465008216)
- Arthur C. Brooks. Gross National Happiness: Why Happiness Matters for America—and How We Can Get More of It. New York, New York: Basic Books, 2008. (ISBN 978-0465002788)
- Arthur C. Brooks. Social Entrepreneurship: A Modern Approach to Social Value Creation. Upper Saddle River, New Jersey: Prentice-Hall, 2008. (ISBN 978-0132330763)
- Arthur C. Brooks. The Battle: How the Fight between Big Government and Free Enterprise Will Shape America's Future. New York, New York: Basic Books, 2010. (ISBN 978-0465022120)
- Arthur C. Brooks. The Road to Freedom: How to Win the Fight for Free Enterprise. New York, New York: Basic Books, 2012. (ISBN 978-0465029402)
- Arthur C. Brooks. The Conservative Heart: How to Build a Fairer, Happier, and More Prosperous America. New York, New York: Broadside Books, 2015. (ISBN 978-0062319753)
- Arthur C. Brooks. Love Your Enemies: How Decent People Can Save America from the Culture of Contempt. New York, New York: Broadside Books, 2019. (ISBN 978-0062883759)
- Brooks, Arthur C. (July 2019). "Your professional decline is coming (much) sooner than you think". The Workplace Report. The Atlantic. 324 (1): 66–76.
- Arthur C. Brooks. From Strength to Strength, Finding Happiness, Success, and Deep Purpose in the Second Half of Life. New York, New York: Portfolio/Penguin, 2022. (ISBN 978-0593191484)
- Arthur C. Brooks, Build the Life You Want: The Art and Science of Getting Happier. New York, New York: Portfolio/Penguin, 2023 (ISBN 978-0593545409)
- Arthur C. Brooks, The Happiness Files: Insights on Work and Life. Boston, Massachusetts: Harvard Business Review Press, 2025 (ISBN 979-8892792264)
- Arthur C. Brooks, The Meaning of Your Life: Finding Purpose in an Age of Emptiness, Portfolio, 2026 (ISBN 9781785046797)

== Filmography ==
- The Pursuit (2019)

Non-profit organization positions
Preceded by Christopher DeMuth	President of the American Enterprise Institute; 2008–2019	Succeeded by Robert Doar
