= Alliance for Securing Democracy =

American national security advocacy group

- Abbreviation: ASD
- Formation: July 2017
- Location: Washington, D.C., US
- Senior Vice President of Democracy: Laura Thornton
- Senior Fellow and Managing Director: David Salvo
- Managing Director: Rachael Dean Wilson
- Parent organization: Institute for Strategic Dialogue–US
- Website: https://securingdemocracy.gmfus.org

The Alliance for Securing Democracy (ASD) was a political advocacy group formed in July 2017. The Institute for Strategic Dialogue–US (ISD-US) and ASD announced in December 2025 that they would be merging under the ISD-US banner effective January 1, 2026.

The organization was chaired and run primarily by former senior United States intelligence and State Department officials. Laura Thornton, formerly of International IDEA, joined ASD as its director in May 2021. Laura Rosenberger, chair of the American Institute in Taiwan and former senior director for China on the Biden administration's National Security Council, previously served as a director of ASD. ASD was housed at the German Marshall Fund of the United States and its work spanned across both the United States and Europe.

== History ==
In 2016, the CIA, FBI, NSA, and the Director of National Intelligence concluded that Russia had interfered in the presidential election that year. Former acting CIA Director Michael Morell, who served on ASD's advisory council, stated that the group would fulfill some of the role that ideally would have been handled by a national investigative commission.

The Institute for Strategic Dialogue–US (ISD-US) and ASD announced in December 2025 that they would be merging under the ISD-US banner effective January 1, 2026.

== Hamilton 68 Dashboard ==
The Hamilton 68 Dashboard was a tool designed by ASD to track Russian influence operations on social media, named after no. 68 of the Federalist Papers, in which Alexander Hamilton had warned about foreign interference in the American electoral process. The original iteration of the Hamilton 68 Dashboard, released in August 2017, tracked 600 Twitter accounts that ASD asserted might be "linked to Russian influence", whether knowingly or unknowingly. ASD did not disclose which accounts the original version of Hamilton 68 tracked, citing its desire to "focus on the behavior of the overall network rather than get dragged into hundreds of individual debates over which troll fits which role". In 2018, ASD's communications director, Bret Schafer, stated that the dashboard didn't specifically track automated bot accounts. Schafer noted "that results on the dashboard are meant to be viewed in a nuanced way" and that not all instances of information appearing on the dashboard were evidence of pro-Kremlin accounts or biases.

In January 2018, Hamilton 68 tracking of the amplification of the hashtag #ReleaseTheMemo was widely cited across major news outlets. Schafer told the Associated Press this amplification represented "the most coordinated such effort" since the dashboard launched. The dashboard's findings prompted congressional action; Senator Dianne Feinstein and Representative Adam Schiff wrote to Twitter and Facebook citing the Alliance for Securing Democracy.

The original version of Hamilton 68 was shut down towards the end of 2018.

Version 2.0 of the Hamilton 68 Dashboard, released in 2019, tracked approximately 600 Twitter social media accounts that the ASD asserts can be "directly attribute[d] to the Russian, Chinese, or Iranian governments or their various news and information channels". The list of these accounts was made public.

In September 2017, and again in May 2021, the group launched similar German-language dashboards focused on possible Russian influence in German politics ahead of the federal elections in those respective years.

In January 2023, journalist Matt Taibbi tweeted about internal Twitter documents related to Hamilton 68 as the 15th installment of the Twitter Files. The documents show that Twitter's former Head of Trust and Safety, Yoel Roth, attempted to identify the accounts tracked in the dashboard. Roth found that only 36 of the 644 accounts he identified were registered in Russia and argued that the dashboard used "shoddy methodology" to incorrectly label authentic accounts as "Russian stooges without evidence". ASD responded to Taibbi's release a few days later, noting that ASD had always maintained that not all of the accounts on the dashboard were controlled by Russia, despite what it described as persistent misunderstandings in the media. The National Desk's Sinnenberg counters Taibbi's criticisms as being hyperbolic.

=== Reception ===
The Hamilton 68 Dashboard has been cited by many news outlets, including The New York Times, The Washington Post, NPR, and Business Insider. When it launched in 2017, James Carden wrote in The Nation that the dashboard seemed to characterize factual news items as Russian propaganda and questioned its impact on political discourse. In 2018, Matthew Ingram noted and Glenn Greenwald and M. C. McGrath criticized its refusal to disclose the Twitter accounts it tracked, and Matt Taibbi criticized it for its "secret methodology". (ASD founders Laura Rosenberger and Jamie Fly have said that the accounts were not disclosed to prevent Russia from shutting them down.)

== Advisory council and staff ==
The ASD was governed by an Advisory Council and an operating staff drawn from the American Marshall Fund. The Washington Post called the membership of the advisory council "a who's who of former senior national security officials from both [the Democratic and Republican] parties." Members of the advisory council have included Michael Chertoff (a Republican who worked in the George W. Bush administration as U.S. Secretary of Homeland Security) and Mike McFaul (a Democrat who worked in the Obama administration as U.S. Ambassador to Russia), former Estonian president Toomas Hendrik Ilves, neoconservative political analyst and commentator William Kristol, and Hillary Clinton's former foreign-policy adviser Jake Sullivan.

== Reception ==
In a 2017 article in The Atlantic, Peter Beinart argued that ASD's efforts were important in understanding Russia's involvement in American politics. Glenn Greenwald criticized the ASD, describing it as a political alliance between neoconservatives and establishment Democrats.

== Recent publications ==
- A Strategy for US Public Diplomacy in the Age of Disinformation, September 2023 (co-authored by Jessica Brandt, Bret Schafer, and Rachael Dean Wilson)
- Civil Society in Ukraine’s Restoration: A Guide to CSOs Mobilizing for a Marshall Plan, September 2023 (co-authored by Josh Rudolph, Elena Andreeva, Viacheslav Kurylo, and Vitalli Nabok)
- China and the Digital Information Stack in the Global South, April 2022 (co-authored by Bryce Barros, Nathan Kohlenberg, and Etienne Soula)

== See also ==
- PropOrNot
