= American Enterprise Institute =

American public policy think tank

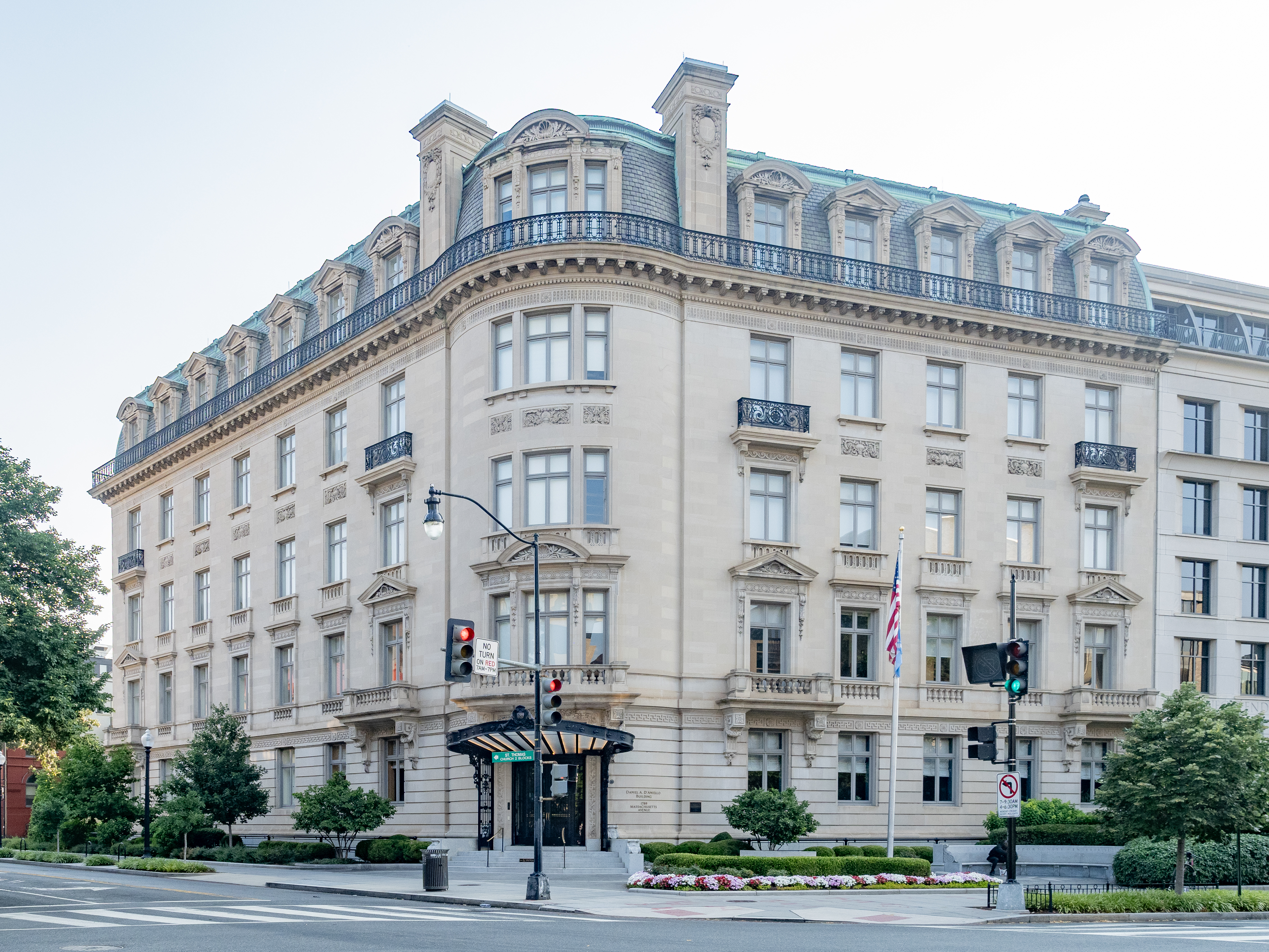
- AEI's headquarters near Dupont Circle in Washington, D.C.
- Abbreviation: AEI
- Formation: 1938; 88 years ago
- Type: Public policy think tank
- Tax ID no.: 53-0218495
- Headquarters: Washington, D.C.
- Location: United States
- Coordinates: 38.909230°N 77.041470°W
- President: Robert Doar
- Revenue: $75.4 million (2025)
- Expenses: $73.5 million (2025)
- Website: aei.org

The American Enterprise Institute for Public Policy Research, known simply as the American Enterprise Institute (AEI), is a think tank based in Washington, D.C. that researches government, politics, economics, and social welfare. AEI is an independent nonprofit organization supported primarily by contributions from foundations, corporations, and individuals.

Founded in 1938, the organization is considered to be aligned with center-right politics AEI advocates in favor of private enterprise, limited government, and liberal democracy. It is governed by a 29-member Board of Trustees. Approximately 185 authors are associated with AEI. Arthur C. Brooks served as president of AEI from 2009 to 2019. He was succeeded by Robert Doar.

== History ==
=== Beginnings (1938–1954) ===
AEI grew out of the American Enterprise Association (AEA), which was founded in 1938 by a group of New York businessmen led by Lewis H. Brown. AEI's founders included executives from Bristol-Myers, Chemical Bank, Chrysler, Eli Lilly, General Mills, and Paine Webber.

AEA's early work in Washington, D.C. involved commissioning and distributing legislative analyses to Congress, which developed AEA's relationships with Melvin Laird and Gerald Ford. Brown eventually shifted AEA's focus to commissioning studies of government policies. These subjects ranged from fiscal to monetary policy and including health care and energy policy, and authors such as Earl Butz, John Lintner, former New Dealer Raymond Moley, and Felix Morley. Brown died in 1951, and AEA languished as a result. In 1952, a group of young policymakers and public intellectuals including Laird, William J. Baroody Sr., Paul McCracken, and Murray Weidenbaum, met to discuss resurrecting AEA.

=== William J. Baroody Sr. (1954–1980) ===
Baroody was executive vice president from 1954 to 1962 and president from 1962 to 1978. Baroody raised money for AEA to expand its financial base beyond the business leaders on the board. During the 1950s and 1960s, AEA's work became more pointed and focused, including monographs by Edward Banfield, James M. Buchanan, P. T. Bauer, Alfred de Grazia, Rose Friedman, and Gottfried Haberler.

In 1962, AEA changed its name to the American Enterprise Institute for Public Policy Research (AEI) to avoid any confusion with a trade association representing business interests attempting to influence politicians. In 1964, William J. Baroody Sr., and several of his top staff at AEI, including Karl Hess, moonlighted as policy advisers and speechwriters for presidential nominee Barry Goldwater in the 1964 presidential election. "Even though Baroody and his staff sought to support Goldwater on their own time without using the institution's resources, AEI came under scrutiny of the IRS in the years following the campaign," author Andrew Rich wrote in 2004. Representative Wright Patman subpoenaed the institute's tax papers, and the IRS initiated a two-year investigation of AEI. After this, AEI's officers attempted to avoid the appearance of partisan political advocacy.

Baroody recruited a resident research faculty; Harvard University economist Gottfried Haberler was the first to join in 1972. In 1977, former president Gerald Ford joined AEI as a "distinguished fellow." Ford brought several of his administration officials with him, including Robert Bork, Arthur Burns, David Gergen, James C. Miller III, Laurence Silberman, and Antonin Scalia. Ford also founded the AEI World Forum, which he hosted until 2005. Other staff hired during this time included Walter Berns and Herbert Stein. Baroody's son, William J. Baroody Jr., a Ford White House official, also joined AEI, and later became president of AEI, succeeding his father in that role in 1978.

The elder Baroody made an effort to recruit neoconservatives who had supported the New Deal and Great Society but were disaffected by what they perceived as the failure of the welfare state. This also included Cold War hawks who rejected the peace agenda of 1972 Democratic presidential candidate George McGovern. Baroody brought Jeane Kirkpatrick, Irving Kristol, Michael Novak, and Ben Wattenberg to AEI.

While at AEI, Kirkpatrick authored "Dictatorships and Double Standards", which brought her to the attention of Ronald Reagan, and Kirkpatrick was later named U.S. permanent representative to the United Nations. AEI also became a home for supply-side economists during the late 1970s and early 1980s. By 1980, AEI had grown from a budget of $1 million and a staff of ten to a budget of $8 million and a staff of 125.

=== William J. Baroody Jr. (1980–1986) ===
Baroody Sr. retired in 1978, and was replaced by his son, William J. Baroody Jr. Baroody Sr. died in 1980, shortly before Reagan took office as U.S. president in January 1981. According to Politico, the think tank "rose to prominence" in this period "as the primary intellectual home of supply-side economics and neoconservatism."

During the Reagan administration, several AEI staff were hired by the administration.

=== Christopher DeMuth (1986–2008) ===
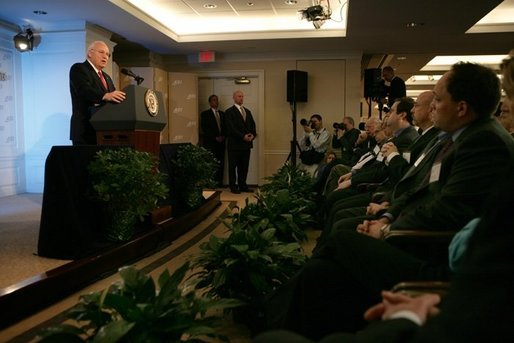
Then U.S. vice president Dick Cheney speaks at AEI on the war on terror, arguing against a withdrawal from the Iraq War, in November 2005.

In December 1986, AEI hired Christopher DeMuth as its new president, and DeMuth served in the role for 22 years.

In 1990, AEI hired Charles Murray (and received his Bradley Foundation support for The Bell Curve) after the Manhattan Institute dropped him. During DeMuth's tenure, the organization turned further to the political right.

AEI had severe financial problems when DeMuth began his presidency. During the George H. W. Bush and Bill Clinton administrations, AEI's revenues grew from $10 million to $18.9 million. Academic David M. Lampton writes that DeMuth was responsive to the financial power of "America's hard right".

The institute's publications Public Opinion and The AEI Economist were merged into The American Enterprise, edited by Karlyn Bowman from 1990 to 1995 and by Karl Zinsmeister from 1995 to 2006, when Glassman created The American.

AEI was closely tied to the George W. Bush administration. More than 20 staff members served either in a Bush administration policy post or on one of the government's many panels and commissions, including Dick Cheney and John R. Bolton. In an address to the institute, Bush said "I admire AEI a lot—I'm sure you know that", Bush said. "After all, I have been consistently borrowing some of your best people." In 2002, Danielle Pletka joined AEI to promote the foreign policy department. AEI and several of its staff—including Michael Ledeen and Richard Perle—became associated with the start of the Iraq War. Bush used a February 2003 AEI dinner to advocate for a democratized Iraq, which he said would inspire the remainder of the Mideast. In 2006–07, AEI staff, including Frederick W. Kagan, provided a strategic framework for the 2007 surge in Iraq. The Bush administration also drew on AEI scholars Leon Kass, who was appointed as the first chairman of the President's Council on Bioethics and Norman J. Ornstein, who headed a campaign finance reform working group that helped draft the Bipartisan Campaign Reform Act.

=== Arthur C. Brooks (2008–2019) ===
When DeMuth retired as president at the end of 2008, AEI's staff numbered 185, with 70 scholars and several dozen adjuncts, and revenues of $31.3 million. Arthur C. Brooks succeeded him as president at the start of the Late-2000s recession. In a 2009 op-ed in The Wall Street Journal, Brooks positioned AEI to be much more aggressive in responding to the policies of the Barack Obama administration. Under his leadership, AEI identified itself with "compassionate conservativism" and the maximisation of happiness. Politico said that Brooks "helped elevate [AEI] into a bastion of free-market orthodoxy and center-right policy wonkery during the Obama years", before leaving to become a "happiness expert" and self-help guru. In 2018, Brooks announced that he would step down effective July 1, 2019.

==== Termination of David Frum's residency ====
On March 25, 2010, AEI resident fellow David Frum announced that his position at the organization had been "terminated." Following this announcement, media outlets speculated that Frum had been "forced out" for writing a post to his FrumForum blog called "Waterloo", in which he criticized the Republican Party's unwillingness to bargain with Democrats on the Patient Protection and Affordable Care Act. In the editorial, Frum claimed that his party's failure to reach a deal "led us to abject and irreversible defeat."

After his termination, Frum clarified that his article had been "welcomed and celebrated" by AEI President Arthur Brooks, and that he had been asked to leave because "these are hard times." Brooks had offered Frum the opportunity to write for AEI on a nonsalaried basis, but Frum declined. The following day, journalist Mike Allen published a conversation with Frum, in which Frum expressed a belief that his termination was the result of pressure from donors. According to Frum, "AEI represents the best of the conservative world ... But the elite isn't leading any more ... I think Arthur [Brooks] took no pleasure in this. I think he was embarrassed."

=== Robert Doar (2019–present) ===
In January 2019, Robert Doar was selected by AEI's board of trustees to be AEI's 12th president, succeeding Arthur Brooks on July 1, 2019. In October 2023, Doar led an AEI delegation (including Kori Schake, Dan Blumenthal, Zack Cooper, and Nicholas Eberstadt, among others) to visit Taiwan to meet with President Tsai Ing-wen.

== Personnel ==
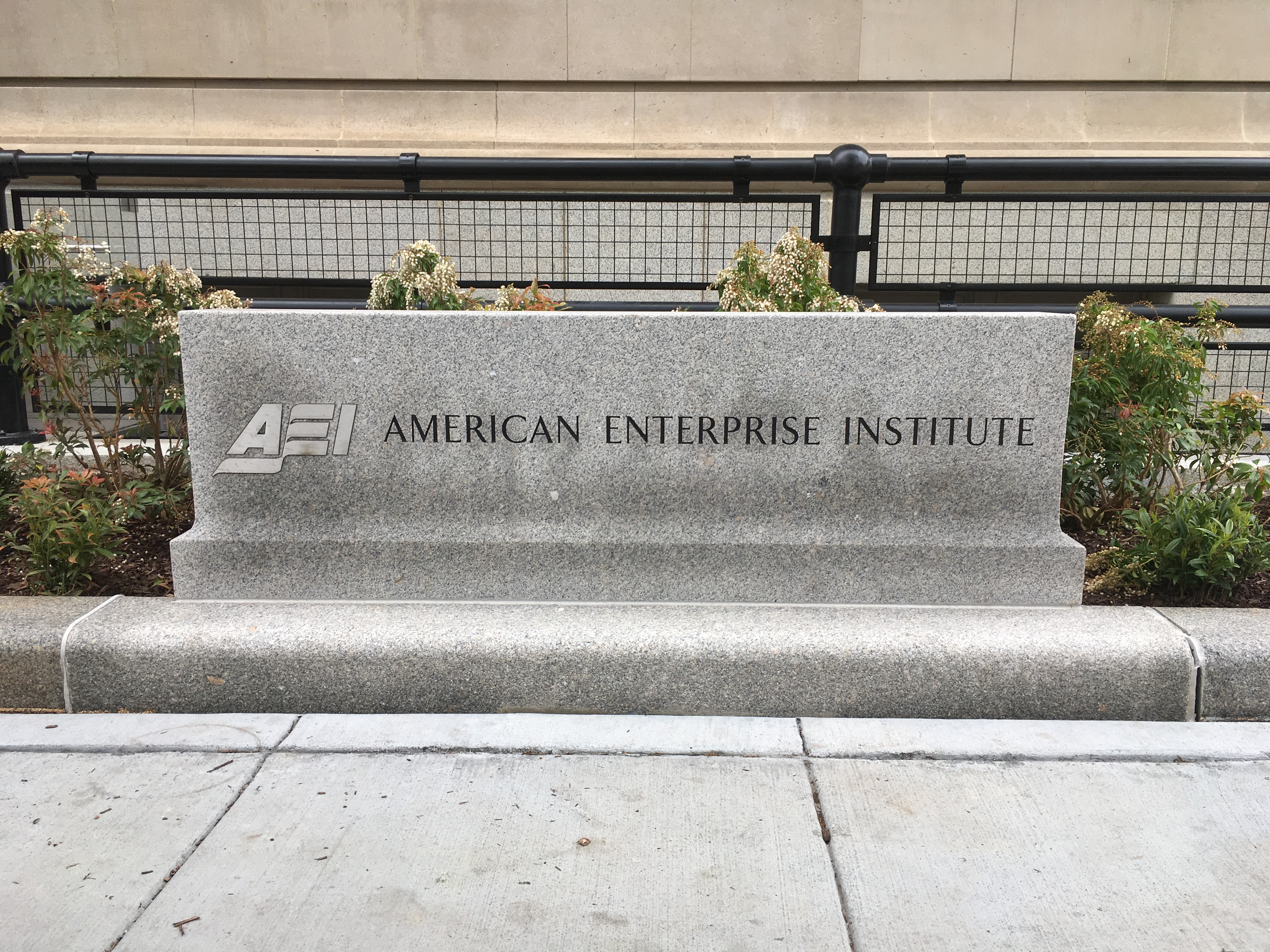
American Enterprise Institute marker

As of 2026, AEI's officers include Robert Doar, Jason Bertsch, Kazuki Ko, Kori Schake, Yuval Levin, Michael R. Strain, and Matthew Continetti.

AEI has a Council of Academic Advisers, which includes Alan J. Auerbach, Eliot A. Cohen, Eugene Fama, Aaron Friedberg, Robert P. George, Eric A. Hanushek, Walter Russell Mead, Mark V. Pauly, R. Glenn Hubbard, Sam Peltzman, Harvey S. Rosen, Jeremy A. Rabkin, and Richard Zeckhauser. The Council of Academic Advisers selects the annual winner of the Irving Kristol Award.

== Board of trustees ==
AEI's board is chaired by Daniel A. D'Aniello. As of 2026, notable trustees include:

- Cliff Asness, hedge fund manager and the co-founder of AQR Capital Management
- Pete Coors, vice chairman of the board of Molson Coors Brewing Company
- Harlan Crow, chairman and CEO, Crow Holdings, the Trammell Crow family's investment company
- Ravenel B. Curry III, president, Eagle Capital Management
- Dick DeVos, president, Windquest Group
- Robert Doar, president, American Enterprise Institute
- Behdad Eghbali, managing partner and cofounder, Clearlake Capital
- Tully Friedman, chairman and CEO, Friedman Fleischer & Lowe
- Christopher Galvin, former CEO and chairman, Motorola
- Harvey Golub, retired chairman and CEO, American Express Company
- Frank Hanna III, CEO, Hanna Capital
- Raymond J. Harbert, executive chairman, Harbert Management Corporation
- Bill Haslam, former Governor of Tennessee
- Pat Neal, chairman of the executive committee, Neal Communities
- Ross Perot Jr., chairman, Hillwood Development Company
- Matthew K. Rose, executive chairman, BNSF Railway
- Edward B. Rust Jr., chairman and CEO, State Farm (former AEI chairman)
- Will Weatherford, managing partner, Weatherford Capital

== Political stance and impact ==
AEI is a member of Atlas Network's group of free-market think tanks and is an associate member of the State Policy Network of conservative and libertarian think tanks.

In the 2000s, AEI was the most prominent think tank associated with American neoconservatism. Irving Kristol, widely considered to be one of the founding fathers of neoconservatism, was a senior fellow at AEI and the AEI issues an 'Irving Kristol Award' in his honour. Paul Ryan has described the AEI as "one of the beachheads of the modern conservative movement".

AEI has close ties with pro-Brexit politicians in the British Conservative Party. For instance, Sajid Javid, Michael Gove, Boris Johnson, and Liz Truss have all made regular appearances at its World Forum and other events, and Suella Braverman and Liam Fox have been hosted by it.

The institute has been described as a right-leaning counterpart to the left-leaning Brookings Institution; however, the two entities have often collaborated. From 1998 to 2008, they co-sponsored the AEI-Brookings Joint Center for Regulatory Studies, and in 2006 they launched the AEI-Brookings Election Reform Project. In 2015, a working group consisting of members from both institutions coauthored a report entitled Opportunity, Responsibility, and Security: A Consensus Plan for Reducing Poverty and Restoring the American Dream.

According to the 2011 Global Go To Think Tank Index Report (Think Tanks and Civil Societies Program, University of Pennsylvania), AEI is number 17 in the "Top Thirty Worldwide Think Tanks" and number 10 in the "Top Fifty United States Think Tanks". As of 2019, the American Enterprise Institute also leads in YouTube subscribers among free-market groups.

== Research programs ==
AEI's research is divided into four broad categories: Economics; Foreign and Defense Policy; Social, Cultural, and Constitutional Studies, and Domestic Policy Studies. Within these areas, research is conducted by resident scholars and through specialized research centers, including the Center on Opportunity and Social Mobility, the Center for Technology, Science, and Energy, the Housing Center, and the Survey Center on American Life.

=== Research centers ===
==== Center on Opportunity and Social Mobility ====
The Institute's research centers include the Center on Opportunity and Social Mobility. The center conducts research on poverty, economic mobility, family formation, workplace participation and opportunity in the United States.

==== Center for Technology, Science and Energy ====
In 2024, AEI established the Center for Technology, Science and Energy to conduct research on artificial intelligence policy, technology governance, industrial policy, and science and innovation policy.

In June 2026, AEI and the Urban Institute announced a bipartisan commission to examine the effects of artificial intelligence on employment, skills and earnings. The commission would also develop policy recommendations addressing skills and earnings, and recommendations addressing workforce transitions.

==== The Housing Center ====
The Housing Center publishes recurring housing market indicators and mortgage market research used by researchers, journalists, and policymakers.

==== The Survey Center on American Life ====
The Survey Center on American Life conducts nationally representative public opinion surveys on American social attitudes, religion and civic life. The center's survey datasets are archived through the Roper Center for Public Opinion.

==== The Center for the Future of American University ====
This Center was established in 2025 to support research and discussion on higher education, academic culture and university reform. It has collaborated with the Johns Hopkins University on initiatives relating to higher education, including faculty exchanges, collaborative research projects and programs intended to promote intellectual diversity.

=== Economic policy studies ===
Economic policy was the original focus of the American Enterprise Association, and "the Institute still keeps economic policy studies at its core". According to AEI's annual report, "The principal goal is to better understand free economies—how they function, how to capitalize on their strengths, how to keep private enterprise robust, and how to address problems when they arise". Michael R. Strain directs economic policy studies at AEI. Throughout the beginning of the 21st-century, AEI staff have pushed for a more conservative approach to aiding the recession that includes major tax cuts.

In 2002, John H. Makin, an AEI resident scholar, published a report supporting President Bush’s tax cuts, writing that the cuts "played a large role in helping to save the economy from a recession". In the report, Makin suggested that further taxes were necessary in order to attain recovery of the economy and that Democrats in Congress who opposed the Bush stimulus plan were foolish for doing so.

==== 2008 financial crisis ====
As the 2008 financial crisis unfolded, The Wall Street Journal stated that predictions by AEI staff about the involvement of housing GSEs had come true. In the late 1990s, Fannie Mae eased credit requirements on the mortgages it purchased and exposed itself to more risk. Peter J. Wallison warned that Fannie Mae and Freddie Mac's public-private status put taxpayers on the line for increased risk. "Because of the agencies' dual public and private form, various efforts to force Fannie Mae and Freddie Mac to fulfill their public mission at the cost of their profitability have failed—and will likely continue to fail", he wrote in 2001. "The only viable solution would seem to be full privatization or the adoption of policies that would force the agencies to adopt this course themselves."

In 2006, Wallison moderated a conference featuring James B. Lockhart III, the chief regulator of Fannie and Freddie. In August 2008, after Fannie and Freddie had been backstopped by the US Treasury Department, Wallison outlined several ways of dealing with the GSEs, including "nationalization through a receivership," outright "privatization," and "privatization through a receivership." The following month, Lockhart and Treasury Secretary Henry Paulson took the former path by putting Fannie and Freddie into federal "conservatorship." As the housing crisis unfolded, AEI sponsored a series of conferences featuring commentators including Desmond Lachman, and Nouriel Roubini. Makin had been warning about the effects of a housing downturn on the broader economy for months. Amid charges that many homebuyers did not understand their complex mortgages, Alex J. Pollock crafted a prototype of a one-page mortgage disclosure form.

==== Tax and fiscal policy ====
Kevin Hassett and Alan D. Viard are AEI's principal tax policy experts, although Alex Brill, R. Glenn Hubbard, and Aparna Mathur also work on the subject. Specific subjects include "income distribution, transition costs, marginal tax rates, and international taxation of corporate income... the Pension Protection Act of 2006; dynamic scoring and the effects of taxation on investment, savings, and entrepreneurial activity; and options to fix the alternative minimum tax". Hassett has coedited several volumes on tax reform.

Viard edited a book on tax policy lessons from the Bush administration. AEI's working paper series includes developing academic works on economic issues. One paper by Hassett and Mathur on the responsiveness of wages to corporate taxation was cited by The Economist; figures from another paper by Hassett and Brill on maximizing corporate income tax revenue was cited by The Wall Street Journal.

==== Center for Regulatory and Market Studies ====
From 1998 to 2008, the Reg-Markets Center was the AEI-Brookings Joint Center for Regulatory Studies, directed by Robert W. Hahn. The center, which no longer exists, sponsored conferences, papers, and books on regulatory decision-making and the impact of federal regulation on consumers, businesses, and governments. It covered a range of disciplines. It also sponsored an annual Distinguished Lecture series. Past lecturers in the series have included William Baumol, Supreme Court Justice Stephen Breyer, Alfred Kahn, Sam Peltzman, Richard Posner, and Cass Sunstein.

Research in AEI's Financial Markets Program also includes banking, insurance and securities regulation, accounting reform, corporate governance, and consumer finance.

==== Energy and environmental policy ====
AEI's work on climate change has been subject to controversy. Some AEI staff and fellows have been critical of the Intergovernmental Panel on Climate Change (IPCC), the international scientific body tasked to evaluate the risk of climate change caused by human activity. According to AEI, it "emphasizes the need to design environmental policies that protect not only nature but also democratic institutions and human liberty". American historian of science Naomi Oreskes notes that this idea became prominent during the conservative turn towards anti-environmentalism in the 1980s. Corporations claimed to uphold a kind of laissez-faire capitalism that promoted individual rights by pushing for deregulation. To do this successfully, companies would fund think tanks like AEI to cast doubt on science and spread disinformation by arguing that environmental dangers were unproven.

In an essay from the AEI outlook series of 2007, the authors discuss the Kyoto Protocol and state that the United States "should be wary of joining an international emissions-trading regime". To back this statement, they point out that committing to the Kyoto emissions goal would be a significant and unrealistic obligation for the United States. In addition, they state that the Kyoto regulations would have an impact not only on governmental policies, but also the private sector through expanding government control over investment decisions. AEI staff said that "dilution of sovereignty" would be the result if the U.S. signed the treaty.

In February 2007, a number of sources, including the British newspaper The Guardian, reported that the AEI had offered scientists $10,000 plus travel expenses and additional payments, asking them to dispute the IPCC Fourth Assessment Report. This offer was criticized as bribery. The letters alleged that the IPCC was "resistant to reasonable criticism and dissent, and prone to summary conclusions that are poorly supported by the analytical work" and asked for essays that "thoughtfully explore the limitations of climate model outputs".

In 2007, The Guardian reported that the AEI received $1.6 million in funding from ExxonMobil, and further notes that former ExxonMobil CEO Lee R. Raymond is the vice-chairman of AEI's board of trustees. This story was repeated by Newsweek, which drew criticism from its contributing editor Robert J. Samuelson because "this accusation was long ago discredited, and Newsweek shouldn't have lent it respectability." The Guardian article was disputed in a The Wall Street Journal editorial. The editorial stated: "AEI doesn't lobby, didn't offer money to scientists to question global warming, and the money it did pay for climate research didn't come from Exxon."

In 2007, AEI scholars published a report promoting carbon taxation as an alternative to cap-and-trade regimes. "Most economists believe a carbon tax (a tax on the quantity of CO2 emitted when using energy) would be a superior policy alternative to an emissions-trading regime," wrote Kenneth P. Green, Kevin Hassett, and Steven F. Hayward. "In fact, the irony is that there is a broad consensus in favor of a carbon tax everywhere except on Capitol Hill, where the 'T word' is anathema." AEI also backs the carbon taxation policy due to an incentive to reduce the use of carbon-intensive energy that would result. "The increased costs of energy would flow through the economy, ultimately giving consumers incentives to reduce their use of electricity, transportation fuels, home heating oil, and so forth". Along with consumers reducing their use of carbon-energy, they will be inclined to buy more efficient appliances, cars, and homes that apply "more attention to energy conservation".

Other AEI staff have argued for similar policies. Thernstrom and Lane codirected a project on whether geoengineering would be a feasible way to "buy us time to make [the] transition [from fossil fuels] while protecting us from the worst potential effects of warming". Green, who departed AEI in 2013, expanded its work on energy policy. He has hosted conferences on nuclear power and ethanol With Aparna Mathur, he evaluated Americans' indirect energy use to discover unexpected areas in which energy efficiencies can be achieved.

In October 2007, resident scholar and executive director of the AEI-Brookings Joint Center for Regulatory Studies Robert W. Hahn commented:

Fending off both sincere and sophistic opposition to cap-and-trade will no doubt require some uncomfortable compromises. Money will be wasted on unpromising R&D; grotesquely expensive renewable fuels may gain a permanent place at the subsidy trough. And, as noted above, there will always be a risk of cheating. But the first priority should be to seize the day, putting a domestic emissions regulation system in place. Without America's political leadership and economic muscle behind it, an effective global climate stabilization strategy isn't possible.

AEI visiting scholar Greg Mankiw wrote in The New York Times in support of a carbon tax on September 16, 2007. He remarked that "there is a broad consensus. The scientists tell us that world temperatures are rising because humans are emitting carbon into the atmosphere. Basic economics tells us that when you tax something, you normally get less of it." After Energy Secretary Steven Chu recommended painting roofs and roads white in order to reflect sunlight back into space and therefore reduce global warming, AEI's magazine The American endorsed the idea. It also stated that "ultimately we need to look more broadly at creative ways of reducing the harmful effects of climate change in the long run." The American's editor-in-chief and fellow Nick Schulz endorsed a carbon tax over a cap and trade program in The Christian Science Monitor on February 13, 2009. He stated that it "would create a market price for carbon emissions and lead to emissions reductions or new technologies that cut greenhouse gases."

Former scholar Steven Hayward has described efforts to reduce global warming as being "based on exaggerations and conjecture rather than science". He has stated that "even though the leading scientific journals are thoroughly imbued with environmental correctness and reject out of hand many articles that don't conform to the party line, a study that confounds the conventional wisdom is published almost every week". Likewise, former AEI scholar Kenneth Green has referred to efforts to reduce greenhouse gas emissions as "the positively silly idea of establishing global-weather control by actively managing the atmosphere's greenhouse-gas emissions", and endorsed Michael Crichton's novel State of Fear for having "educated millions of readers about climate science".

Christopher DeMuth, former AEI president, accepted that the Earth has warmed in recent decades, but he stated that "it's not clear why this happened" and charged as well that the IPCC "has tended to ignore many distinguished physicists and meteorologists whose work casts doubt on the influence of greenhouse gases on global temperature trends". Fellow James Glassman also disputes the scientific consensus on climate change, having written numerous articles criticizing the Kyoto accords and climate science more generally for Tech Central Station. He supported the views of U.S. Senator Jim Inhofe (R-OK), who claims that "global warming is 'the greatest hoax ever perpetrated on the American people,'" and, like Green, cites Crichton's novel State of Fear, which "casts serious doubt on global warming and extremists who espouse it". Joel Schwartz, an AEI visiting fellow, stated: "The Earth has indeed warmed during the last few decades and may warm further in the future. But the pattern of climate change is not consistent with the greenhouse effect being the main cause."

In 2013, the magazine of the UK's Institute of Economic Affairs published an article by AEI fellow Roger Bate entitled "20 years denouncing eco-militants", in which he argued that "evidence of climate impact is still hard to prove, and harm even more difficult to establish", and dismissed calls for a ban on the insecticide DDT as "green alarmism". In 2018, British investigative website openDemocracy repeated that AEI "has long been funded by ExxonMobile", an allegation repeated by Esquire the same year, describing AEI's Danielle Pletka of spreading disinformation about climate change on the Meet the Press TV show.

=== Foreign and defense policy studies ===
AEI's foreign and defense policy studies researchers focus on "how political and economic freedom—as well as American interests—are best promoted around the world". AEI staff have tended to be advocates of a hard U.S. line on threats or potential threats to the United States, including the Soviet Union during the Cold War, Saddam Hussein's Iraq, the People's Republic of China, North Korea, Iran, Syria, Venezuela, Russia, and terrorist or militant groups like al Qaeda and Hezbollah. Likewise, AEI staff have promoted closer U.S. ties with countries whose interests or values they view as aligned with America's, such as Israel, the Republic of China (Taiwan), India, Australia, Japan, Mexico, Colombia, the Philippines, the United Kingdom, and emerging post-Communist states such as Poland.

In 2015, AEI gave Israeli Prime Minister Benjamin Netanyahu its Irving Kristol Award.

AEI's foreign and defense policy studies department, directed by Danielle Pletka, is the part of the institute most commonly associated with neoconservatism. According to Vanity Fair, in 2002 it was seen "as the intellectual command post of the neoconservative campaign for regime change in Iraq". Prominent foreign-policy neoconservatives at AEI include Richard Perle, Gary Schmitt, and Paul Wolfowitz. Joshua Muravchik and Michael Ledeen (the latter seen as an "ultra neo-conservative") spent many years at AEI, although they departed at around the same time as Reuel Marc Gerecht in 2008 in what was rumored to be a "purge" of neoconservatives at the institute, possibly "signal[ing] the end of [neoconservatism's] domination over the think tank over the past several decades", although Muravchik later said it was the result of personality and management conflicts.

==== U.S. national security strategy, defense policy, and the "surge" ====
In late 2006, the security situation in Iraq continued to deteriorate, and the Iraq Study Group proposed a phased withdrawal of U.S. troops and further engagement of Iraq's neighbors. Consulting with AEI's Iraq Planning Group, Frederick W. Kagan published an AEI report entitled Choosing Victory: A Plan for Success in Iraq calling for "phase one" of a change in strategy to focus on "clearing and holding" neighborhoods and securing the population; a troop escalation of seven Army brigades and Marine regiments; and a renewed emphasis on reconstruction, economic development, and jobs.

While the report was being drafted, Kagan and Keane were briefing President Bush, Vice President Cheney, and other senior Bush administration officials behind the scenes. According to Bob Woodward, "[Peter J.] Schoomaker was outraged when he saw news coverage that retired Gen. Jack Keane, the former Army vice chief of staff, had briefed the president on December 11 about a new Iraq strategy being proposed by the American Enterprise Institute, the conservative think tank. 'When does AEI start trumping the Joint Chiefs of Staff on this stuff?' Schoomaker asked at the next chiefs' meeting."

Kagan, Keane, and Senators John McCain and Joseph Lieberman presented the plan at a January 5, 2007, event at AEI. Bush announced the change of strategy on January 10. Kagan authored three subsequent reports monitoring the progress of the surge.

AEI's defense policy researchers, who also include Schmitt and Giselle Donnelly, also work on issues related to the U.S. military forces' size and structure and military partnerships with allies (both bilaterally and through institutions such as NATO). Schmitt directs AEI's Program on Advanced Strategic Studies, which "analyzes the long-term issues that will impact America's security and its ability to lead internationally".

==== Area studies ====
Its Asia studies program is directed by Dan Blumenthal. The program covers "the rise of China as an economic and political power; Taiwan's security and economic agenda; Japan's military transformation; the threat of a nuclear North Korea; and the impact of regional alliances and rivalries on U.S. military and economic relationships in Asia". Blumenthal and his team wrote several articles for ForeignPolicy.com and other outlets during the Obama presidency advocating for military support and funding for Taiwan.

Papers in AEI's Tocqueville on China Project series "elicit the underlying civic culture of post-Mao China, enabling policymakers to better understand the internal forces and pressures that are shaping China's future".

AEI's Europe program was previously housed under the auspices of the New Atlantic Initiative, which was directed by Radek Sikorski before his return to Polish politics in 2005. Leon Aron's work forms the core of the institute's program on Russia. AEI staff tend to view Russia as posing "strategic challenges for the West".

Mark Falcoff, now retired, was previously AEI's resident Latinamericanist, focusing on the Southern Cone, Panama, and Cuba. He has warned that the road for Cuba after Fidel Castro's rule or the lifting of the U.S. trade embargo would be difficult for an island scarred by a half-century of poverty and civil turmoil. Roger Noriega's focuses at AEI are on Venezuela, Brazil, the Mérida Initiative with Mexico and Central America, and hemispheric relations.

AEI has historically devoted significant attention to the Middle East, especially through the work of former resident scholars Ledeen and Muravchik. Pletka's research focus also includes the Middle East, and she coordinated a conference series on empowering democratic dissidents and advocates in the Arab World. In 2009, AEI launched the Critical Threats Project, led by Kagan, to "highlight the complexity of the global challenges the United States faces with a primary focus on Iran and al Qaeda's global influence". The project includes IranTracker.org, with contributions from Ali Alfoneh, Ahmad Majidyar and Michael Rubin, among others.

==== International organizations and economic development ====
For several years, AEI and the Federalist Society cosponsored NGOWatch, which was later subsumed into Global Governance Watch, "a web-based resource that addresses issues of transparency and accountability in the United Nations, NGOs, and related international organizations". NGOWatch returned as a subsite of Global Governance Watch, led by Jon Entine. AEI scholars focusing on international organizations includes John Bolton, the former U.S. ambassador to the United Nations, and John Yoo, who researches international law and sovereignty.

AEI's research on economic development dates back to the early days of the institute. P. T. Bauer authored a monograph on development in India in 1959, and Edward Banfield published a booklet on the theory behind foreign aid in 1970. Since 2001, AEI has sponsored the Henry Wendt Lecture in International Development, named for Henry Wendt, an AEI trustee emeritus and former CEO of SmithKline Beckman.

Nicholas Eberstadt holds the Henry Wendt Chair, focusing on demographics, population growth and human capital development; he served on the federal HELP Commission.

Roger Bate focuses his research on malaria, HIV/AIDS, counterfeit and substandard drugs, access to water, and other problems endemic in the developing world.

=== Health policy studies ===
AEI scholars have engaged in health policy research since the institute's early days. A Center for Health Policy Research was established in 1974. For many years, Robert B. Helms led the health department. AEI's long-term focuses in health care have included national insurance, Medicare, Medicaid, pharmaceutical innovation, health care competition, and cost control.

The center was replaced in the mid-1980s with the Health Policy Studies Program. The AEI Press has published dozens of books on health policy since the 1970s. Since 2003, AEI has published the Health Policy Outlook series on new developments in U.S. and international health policy. AEI also published A Better Prescription in February 2010 to outline their ideal plan to healthcare reform, calling for putting the money and control in the hands of the consumers and continuing the market-based system of healthcare, a form of healthcare that "relies on financial incentives rather than central direction and control."

According to openDemocracy, "In the late 1990s, while he was funded by the tobacco industry, AEI fellow Roger Bate argued against the science which shows that exposure to tobacco causes cancer."

Helms long argued against the tax break for employer-sponsored health insurance, arguing that it distorts insurance markets and limits consumer choices.

Scott Gottlieb, also a medical doctor, rejoined AEI after a term as commissioner with the Food and Drug Administration. He has expressed concern about relatively unreliable comparative effectiveness research being used to restrict treatment options under a public plan.

Roger Bate's work includes international health policy, especially pharmaceutical quality, HIV/AIDS, malaria, and multilateral health organizations.

Paul Ryan, then-minority point man for health care in the House of Representatives, delivered the keynote address at a 2009 AEI conference on mandated universal coverage, insurance exchanges, the public plan option, medical practice and treatment, and revenue to cover federal health care costs.

In 2004, as Purdue Pharma, a company known as the maker of OxyContin, one of the many drugs abused in the opioid epidemic in the United States, was facing a threat to its sales due to rising lawsuits against it, resident fellow Sally Satel wrote an op ed for the New York Times. She commented, “When you scratch the surface of someone who is addicted to painkillers, you usually find a seasoned drug abuser with a previous habit involving pills, alcohol, heroin or cocaine. Contrary to media portrayals, the typical OxyContin addict does not start out as a pain patient who fell unwittingly into a drug habit.” According to AP, Satel "sometimes cited Purdue-funded studies and doctors in her articles on addiction for major news outlets and occasionally shared drafts of the pieces with Purdue officials in advance, including on occasions in 2004 and 2016." In 2018, she was hired by JD Vance's charity, Our Ohio Renewal, to a residency in Ohio. When this was criticised because of her ties to Purdue, Satel denied having consulted with Purdue.

=== Legal and constitutional studies ===
The AEI Legal Center for the Public Interest, formed in 2007 from the merger of the National Legal Center for the Public Interest, houses all legal and constitutional research at AEI. The institute was influential in the law and economics movement in the 1970s and 1980s with the publication of Regulation magazine and AEI Press books. Robert Bork published The Antitrust Paradox with AEI support. Other jurists, legal scholars, and constitutional scholars who have conducted research at AEI include Walter Berns, Richard Epstein, Bruce Fein, Robert Goldwin, Antonin Scalia, and Laurence Silberman.

The AEI Legal Center sponsors the annual Gauer Distinguished Lecture in Law and Public Policy. Past lecturers include Stephen Breyer, George H. W. Bush, Christopher Cox, Douglas Ginsburg, Anthony Kennedy, Sandra Day O'Connor, Colin Powell, Ronald Reagan, William Rehnquist, Condoleezza Rice, Margaret Thatcher, and William H. Webster.

Ted Frank, the director of the AEI Legal Center, focuses on liability law and tort reform. Michael S. Greve focuses on constitutional law and federalism, including federal preemption. According to Jonathan Rauch, in 2005, Greve convened "a handful of free-market activists and litigators met in a windowless 11th-floor conference room at the American Enterprise Institute in Washington" in opposition to the legality of the Public Company Accounting Oversight Board. "By the time the meeting finished, the participants had decided to join forces and file suit... . No one paid much attention. But the yawning stopped on May 18, [2009,] when the Supreme Court announced it will hear the case."

=== Political and public opinion studies ===
AEI's research program has published studies on political processes and institutions since the 1970s. The AEI Press published a series of several dozen volumes in the 1970s and 1980s called "At the Polls"; in each volume, AEI's researchers assess a country's recent presidential or parliamentary election. In the early 1980s, AEI researchers were commissioned by the U.S. government to monitor plebiscites in Palau, the Federated States of Micronesia, and the Marshall Islands. Ornstein led a working group that drafted the Bipartisan Campaign Reform Act of 2002.

AEI published Public Opinion magazine from 1978 to 1990 under the editorship of Seymour Martin Lipset and Ben Wattenberg, assisted by Karlyn Bowman. The institute's work on polling continues with public opinion features in The American Enterprise and The American and Bowman's AEI Studies in Public Opinion.

=== Social and cultural studies ===
AEI's social and cultural studies program dates to the 1970s, when William J. Baroody Sr., invited Irving Kristol and Michael Novak to take up residence at AEI. Since then, AEI has sponsored research on various issues, including education, religion, race and gender, and social welfare.

Supported by the Bradley Foundation, AEI has hosted since 1989 the Bradley Lecture Series. Notable speakers in the series have included Kristol, Novak, Allan Bloom, Robert Bork, David Brooks, Lynne Cheney, Ron Chernow, Tyler Cowen, Niall Ferguson, Francis Fukuyama, Eugene Genovese, Robert P. George, Gertrude Himmelfarb, Samuel P. Huntington, Paul Johnson, Leon Kass, Charles Krauthammer, Bernard Lewis, Seymour Martin Lipset, Harvey C. Mansfield, Michael Medved, Allan H. Meltzer, Edmund Morris, Charles Murray, Steven Pinker, Norman Podhoretz, Richard Posner, Jonathan Rauch, Andrew Sullivan, Cass Sunstein, Sam Tanenhaus, James Q. Wilson, John Yoo, and Fareed Zakaria.

==== Education ====
Education policy studies at AEI are directed by Frederick M. Hess. Hess co-directs AEI's Future of American Education Project, whose working group includes Washington, D.C. schools chancellor Michelle Rhee and Michael Feinberg, the cofounder of KIPP.

AEI is a national allied organization of the American Federation for Children founded in 2010 by Dick and Betsy DeVos of the DeVos Family Foundation. The AEI were supportive of Betsy DeVos' positions when she served under Donald Trump as Education Secretary in 2017-21. Hess supported her plan to gut the Borrower Defense Rule, that enables defrauded students to seek debt relief. In a National Review op-ed, Hess praised DeVos’ proposal to base debt forgiveness on student income as “clearly better for colleges, taxpayers, and students”.

In a 2024 report co-authored with The Heritage Foundation, AEI argued that higher education institutions should not give faculty stipends to join or attend conferences of professional organizations because these groups make statements on political issues.

== Funding ==
In the 1980s, about 60% of its funding came from organizations like Lilly Endowment, the Smith Richardson Foundation, the Rockefeller Brothers Trust and the Earhart Foundation. The remaining of their funding was from major corporations like Bethlehem Steel, Exxon, J.C. Penney and the Chase Manhattan Bank.

As of 2005, AEI had received $960,000 from ExxonMobil. Purdue Pharma, a company known as the maker of OxyContin, one of the many drugs abused in the opioid epidemic in the United States, donated $50,000 a year to the AEI from 2003 through 2019, plus contributions for special events, adding to a total greater than $800,000.

In the 2009 tax year, its four largest funders were a donor-advised fund, Donors Capital Fund ($2,000,000), Paul Singer ($1,100,000), the Kern Family Foundation ($1,071,912) and the Taipei Economic and Cultural Representative Office (TECRO), Taiwan’s equivalent to an embassy. Seventh largest was the US Chamber of Commerce ($473,000). In 2010, AEI received a US$2.5 million grant from the Donors Capital Fund. Foundations associated with the Koch brothers have been major funders of the Institute.

A 2013 study by Drexel University Sociologist Robert J. Brulle noted that AEI received $86.7 million between 2003 and 2010.

AEI received more than $1.6 million from the Charles Koch Foundation between 2011 and 2016, over $5 million from conservative donor advised funds DonorsTrust and Donors Capital Fund between 2012 and 2016, over $1.7 million from the Sarah Scaife Foundation between 2012 and 2016, $480,000 from the Bradley Foundation from 2012 to 2016, and $425,000 from the Coors Foundation between 2011 and 2016.

In 2014, the charity evaluating service American Institute of Philanthropy gave AEI an "A−" grade in its CharityWatch "Top-Rated Charities" listing. AEI's revenues for the fiscal year ending June 2015 were $84,616,388 against expenses of $38,611,315.

In 2017-2018, the AEI received significant funding from the Dick and Betsy DeVos Family Foundation, including $1 million in 2017.

== See also ==
- List of American Enterprise Institute scholars and fellows
- Francis Boyer Award
- Irving Kristol Award
