= Sam Peltzman =

Professor emeritus at University of Chicago

Sam Peltzman is professor emeritus at the Booth School of Business, University of Chicago. He is an editor of The Journal of Law and Economics and was editor of the Journal of Political Economy from 1974 till 1989. Peltzman's research has focused on issues related to the interface between the public sector and the private economy. His published work includes numerous articles in academic journals.

He earned his Ph.D. in economics from the University of Chicago in 1965 and his B.B.A. from City College of New York in 1960.

He received the Quantrell Award.

== Important publications ==
- "The Structure of the Money-Expenditures Relationship," American Economic Review, 1969.
- "The Effect of Government Subsidies-in-Kind on Private Expenditures: The Case of Higher Education," Journal of Political Economy, 1973.
- "The Effects of Auto Safety Regulation," Journal of Political Economy, 1975.
- The Regulation of Automobile Safety, American Enterprise Institute, 1976.
- "The Gains and Losses from Industrial Concentration," Journal of Law and Economics, 1977.
- "The Growth of Government," Journal of Law and Economics, 1980.
- "The Effect of FTC Advertising Regulation," Journal of Law and Economics, 1981.
- "An Economic Interpretation of the History of Congressional Voting," American Economic Review, 1985.
- "Economic Conditions and Gubernatorial Elections," American Economic Review, 1987.
- "How Efficient is the Voting Market?" Journal of Law and Economics, 1990.
- "Voters as Fiscal Conservatives," Quarterly Journal of Economics, 1992.
- Political Participation and Government Regulation, University of Chicago Press, 1998.
- "The Decline of Antitrust Enforcement," Review of Industrial Organization, 2001.
- "Mortality Inequality," Journal of Economic Perspectives, 2009.

== See also ==
- Peltzman effect
