= Robert Doar =

American academic and businessman

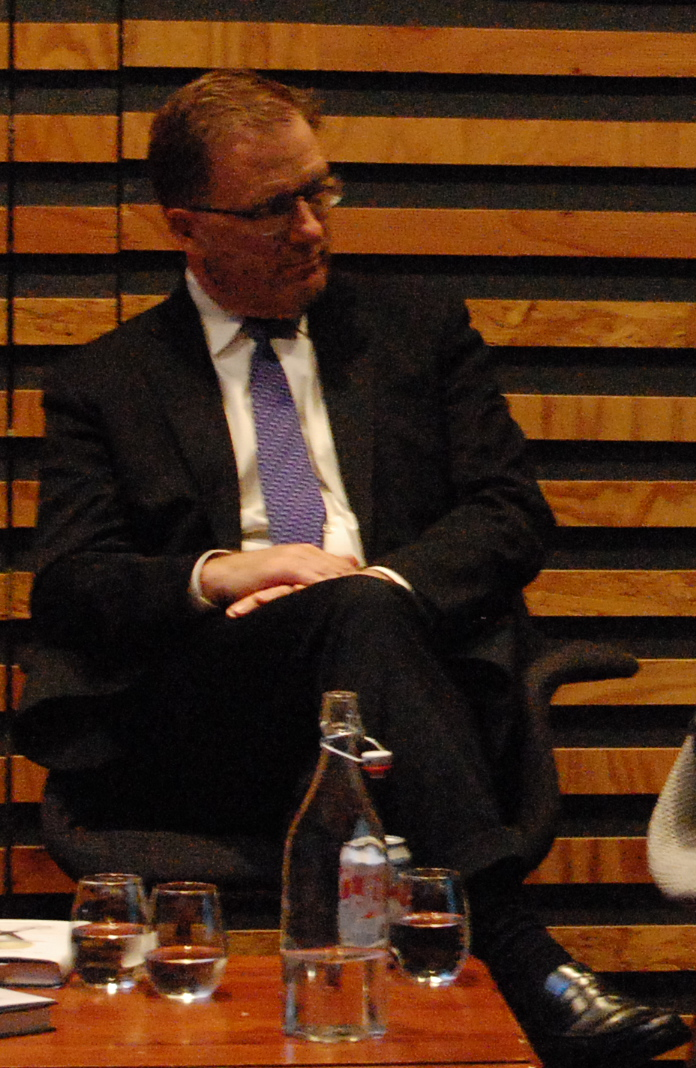
- Doar in April 2017
- Born: Robert Larkin Doar; Washington, D.C., U.S.
- Education: Princeton University (BA)
- Children: 4
- Father: John Doar

Robert Larkin Doar is an American businessman, writer, and former public administrator serving as the president of the American Enterprise Institute. His research focuses on federal and state antipoverty policies and safety net programs.

== Early life and education ==
Doar was born in Washington, D.C., the son of former Assistant Attorney General for Civil Rights John Doar, an American civil rights movement figure, and Anne Leffingwell Doar. He has one sister, Gael, and two brothers, Michael and Burke.

He attended St. Ann's School, Phillips Academy, and Princeton University, from where he graduated with an A.B. in history in 1983 after completing a 130-page senior thesis titled "'With Thoroughness and Honor' The Work of the Impeachment Inquiry Staff of the House Judiciary Committee 1974." While at Princeton, Doar was a member of the Princeton Tigers men's basketball "green team", a practice squad that did not dress for competitive play. In 1981, he traveled with the team to the NCAA men's basketball tournament, where Princeton lost to BYU in the round of 48.

== Career ==
After graduating from Princeton, he began working at the New York City Office of Business Development, where he was charged with assisting small businesses relocating to lower rent areas of the city. He then moved to Washington, D.C., where he became deputy to the editor-in-chief of The Washington Monthly. He was appointed editor of the Harlem Valley Times in Dutchess County, New York, and then worked as assistant vice president of the First National Bank of Hudson Valley.

In May 1995, he became the Deputy Commissioner of the New York State Office of Temporary and Disability Assistance's Division of Child Support Enforcement. In 2003, Governor George Pataki appointed him as Commissioner of the Office of Temporary and Disability Assistance. He is a member of the board of directors of the research organization Child Trends.

Before joining the American Enterprise Institute, he was appointed by Mayor Michael Bloomberg on January 8, 2007, to serve as commissioner of the New York City Human Resources Administration, where he oversaw the city's welfare and public assistance programs.

Doar has testified before the United States Congress, and has written for The Wall Street Journal, USA Today, The Hill, National Review, and other publications.

=== American Enterprise Institute ===
Doar was served co-chair of the bipartisan National Commission on Hunger and a lead member of the AEI-Brookings Institution working group on poverty and opportunity, which published a report, "Opportunity, Responsibility, and Security: A Consensus Plan for Reducing Poverty and Restoring the American Dream." He is the editor of "A Safety Net That Works: Improving Federal Programs for Low-Income Americans," an AEI publication in which experts discuss major federal public assistance programs and offer proposals for reform. In 2018, he helped convene a bipartisan working group with Brookings and Opportunity America that published a report, "Work, Skills, Community: Restoring Opportunity for the Working Class."

Non-profit organization positions
Preceded by Arthur C. Brooks	President of the American Enterprise Institute; 2019–present	Incumbent
