= Kori Schake =

American international relations scholar

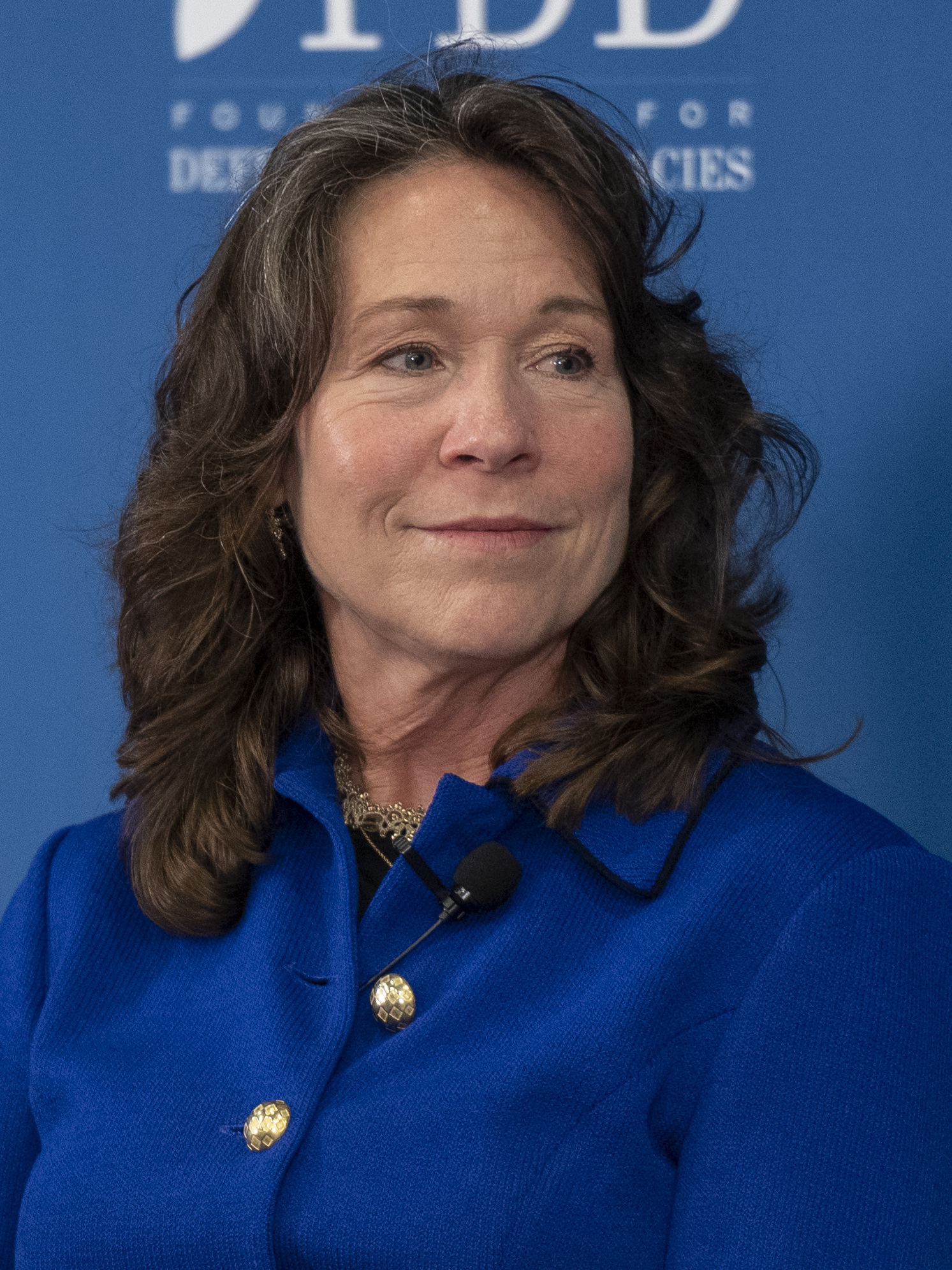
- Schake in 2020
- Education: Stanford University (BA); University of Maryland, College Park (MPA, MA, PhD)
- Scientific career
- Fields: Foreign policy National defense Government
- Workplaces: American Enterprise Institute Hoover Institution; United States Military Academy at West Point; Orbis; Centre for European Reform
- Academic advisors: George Quester; Thomas Schelling; Catherine Kelleher

Kori N. Schake (/ˈʃɑːki/ SHAH-kee; born 1962) is an American international relations scholar currently serving as director of foreign and defense policy at the American Enterprise Institute. She has held several high-level positions in the U.S. Defense and State Departments and on the National Security Council. She was a foreign policy adviser to the McCain–Palin 2008 presidential campaign. Schake is a contributing writer at The Atlantic. She serves on the board of advisors of Foreign Policy Research Institute and the Alexander Hamilton Society. Schake is a member of the Defense Policy Board Advisory Committee.

== Education ==
Schake obtained her PhD in government from the University of Maryland, where she was a student of Thomas Schelling and Catherine Kelleher. She holds an MA in government and politics from the University of Maryland and a MPA from the University of Maryland School of Public Policy. She completed her undergraduate studies in international relations at Stanford University, where she studied under Condoleezza Rice.

== Career ==
=== Pentagon ===
Schake's first government job was with U.S. Department of Defense as a NATO desk officer in the Joint Staff's Strategic Plans and Policy Division (J-5), where from 1990 to 1994 she worked military issues of German unification, NATO after the Cold War, and alliance expansion. She also spent two years (1994–1996) in the Office of the Secretary of Defense as the special assistant to the Assistant Secretary for Strategy and Requirements.

=== National Security Council ===
During President George W. Bush's first term, she was the director for defense strategy and requirements on the National Security Council. She was responsible for interagency coordination for long-term defense planning and coalition maintenance issues. Projects she contributed to include conceptualizing and budgeting for continued transformation of defense practices, the most significant realignment of U.S. military forces and bases around the world since 1950, creating NATO's Allied Command Transformation and the NATO Response Force, and recruiting and retaining coalition partners for operations in Afghanistan and Iraq.

=== State Department ===
Schake was the deputy director for policy planning in the U.S. State Department from December 2007 to May 2008. Her responsibilities included staff management as well as resourcing and organizational effectiveness issues, including a study of State Department reforms that enable integrated political, economic, and military strategies.

=== Academia ===
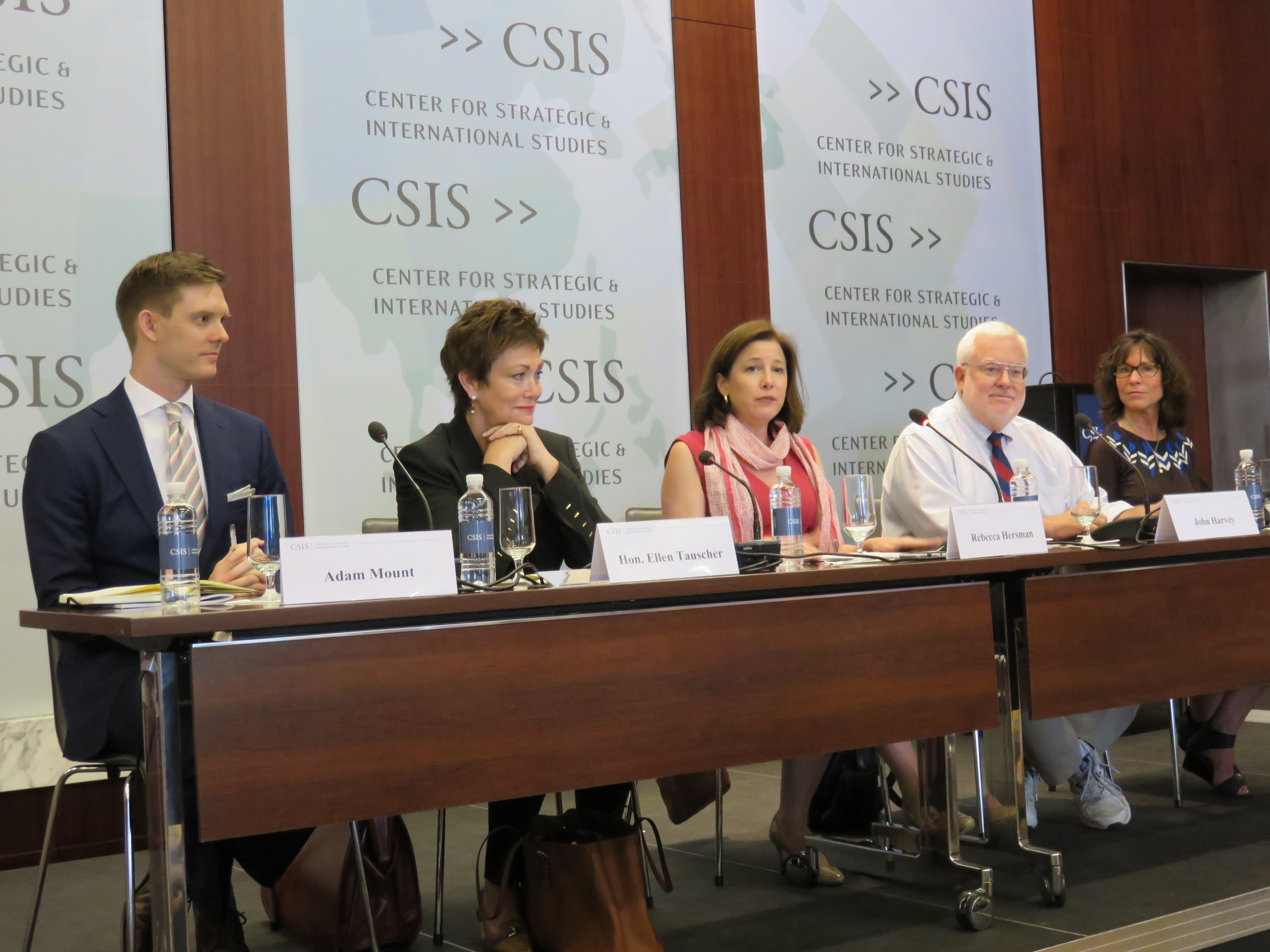
Schake (far right) participating in a panel discussion at the Center for Strategic and International Studies in June 2017

She has held the Distinguished Chair of International Security Studies at West Point, and also served in the faculties of the Johns Hopkins School of Advanced International Studies, the University of Maryland's School of Public Policy, and the National Defense University.

She was previously a research fellow at Stanford University's Hoover Institution. She blogs regularly for Shadow Government on Foreign Policy and is on the editorial board of Orbis and the board of Centre for European Reform. She is also commonly featured on the Deep State Radio podcast. Schake advises Spirit of America, a 501(c)(3) organization that supports US troops.

=== Trans-Atlantic Task Force ===
Since 2019, Schake has also been serving on the Transatlantic Task Force of the German Marshall Fund and the Bundeskanzler-Helmut-Schmidt-Stiftung (BKHS), co-chaired by Karen Donfried and Wolfgang Ischinger.

=== McCain–Palin campaign ===
Schake left the State Department in order to serve as a senior policy advisor to the McCain–Palin 2008 presidential campaign, where she was responsible for policy development and outreach in the areas of foreign and defense policy. Earlier in the campaign, she had been an adviser to Rudy Giuliani.

In 2020, Kori endorsed Joe Biden for president. On February 12, 2021, Secretary of Defense Lloyd Austin appointed Schake as one of four departmental representatives to the Commission on the Naming of Items of the Department of Defense That Commemorate the Confederate States of America or Any Person Who Served Voluntarily with the Confederate States of America.

In 2020, Schake, along with over 130 other former Republican national security officials, signed a statement that asserted that President Trump was unfit to serve another term, and "to that end, we are firmly convinced that it is in the best interest of our nation that Vice President Joe Biden be elected as the next president of the United States, and we will vote for him."

== Personal life ==
Schake was raised in a small town in Sonoma County, California, by her parents Cecelia and Wayne, a former Pan Am pilot. Kori has a brother and sister. Kristina Schake, her younger sister, has also worked in the White House and played key roles on Democratic presidential campaigns, working with Michelle Obama and on the Hillary Clinton 2016 presidential campaign. Despite their political differences, they remain very close.

== Publications ==
=== Books ===
- The State and the Soldier: A History of Civil-Military Relations in the United States, (Polity, 2025) ISBN 978-1-5095-7053-9
- America vs the West: Can the Liberal World Order be preserved?, (Penguin Random House Australia, 2018) ISBN 978-0-1437-9536-0.
- Safe Passage: The Transition from British to American Hegemony, (Harvard University Press, 2017) ISBN 978-0-674-97507-1

=== Articles ===
- Trump's Speech to Generals Was Incitement to Violence Against Americans, Foreign Policy, October 1, 2025
- Dispensable Nation: America in a Post-American World, Foreign Affairs, June 24, 2025
- Congress Must Constrain Trump, Foreign Policy, June 11, 2025
- Why Biden's Foreign Policy Fell Short, Foreign Policy, January 7, 2025
- The National Security Imperative for a Trump Presidency, Foreign Affairs, November 8, 2024
- North Korea Joining Russia's War Is a Sign of Weakness, Foreign Policy, November 5, 2024
- The Case for Conservative Internationalism, Foreign Affairs, December 4, 2023
- Biden's Foreign Policy is a Mess, Foreign Affairs, February 10, 2023
- America Must Spend More on Defense, Foreign Affairs, April 5, 2022
- Masters and Commanders Are Civil-Military Relations in Crisis?, Foreign Affairs, August 24, 2021
- The Roads Not Taken in Afghanistan, Foreign Affairs, August 25, 2021
- The Post-American Order, Foreign Affairs, October 21, 2020
- Back to Basics, Foreign Affairs, April 16, 2019
- "Choices for the Quadrennial Defense Review", Orbis, Summer 2009
- NATO after the Cold War, 1991–1995: Institutional Competition and the Collapse of the French Alternative, Contemporary European History, November 1998

=== Reports ===
- Mattis, Jim; Schake, Kori, eds. (August 2016). Warriors and Citizens: American Views of Our Military. Stanford, California: Hoover Institution. ISBN 978-0-8179-1934-4.
- State of Disrepair: Fixing the Culture and Practices of the State Department, (Hoover Institution 2012) ISBN 978-0-8179-1454-7.
- Managing American Hegemony: Essays on Power in a Time of Dominance, (Hoover Institution 2009) ISBN 978-0-8179-4902-0.
- The US Elections and Europe: The Coming Crisis of High Expectations, (Centre for European Reform, 2007).
- "Dealing with a Nuclear Iran," Policy Review (April/May 2007).
- "Jurassic Pork," The New York Times, 9 February 2006.
- "An American Eulogy for European Defence," in Anne Deighton, ed., Securing Europe? (ETH Zurich, 2006) ISBN 978-3-905696-11-0.
- "National Security: A Better Approach," with Bruce Berkowitz, Hoover Digest (No. 4, 2005).
- "NATO Strategy and the German-American Relationship," in Detlef Junker, ed., The United States and Germany in the Era of the Cold War (Cambridge University Press, 2004) ISBN 978-0-521-83420-9.
- The Berlin Wall Crisis, edited with John Gearson (Palgrave, 2002) ISBN 978-0-333-92960-5.
- "How America Should Lead," (with Klaus Becher), Policy Review (August/September 2002).
- Constructive Duplication: Reducing EU Reliance on US Military Assets (Centre for European Reform, January 2002).
- The Strategic Implications of a Nuclear-Armed Iran, with Judith S. Yaphe, McNair Paper 64 (National Defense University Press, 2001).
- "Arms Control After the Cold War: The Challenge of Diverging Security Agendas," in S. Victor Papacosma, Sean Kay, and Mark R. Rubin, eds., NATO After Fifty Years (2001) ISBN 978-0-8420-2886-8.
- Do European Union Defense Initiatives Threaten NATO? (Strategic Forum, National Defense University, August 2001).
- Evaluating NATO's Efficiency in Crisis Management, Les Notes de L’IFRI, No 21 (Institute Francais des Relations Internationales, 2000).
- "NATO's ‘Fundamental Divergence’ Over Proliferation," in Ted Galen Carpenter, ed., The Journal of Strategic Studies, special issue on NATO Enters the 21st Century (September 2000); also published as a book by Frank Cass, 2001.
- "Building A European Defense Capability," with Amaya Bloch-Laine and Charles Grant, in Survival (IISS, Spring 1999).
- "NATO Chronicle: New World Disorder," Joint Forces Quarterly (April 1999).
- Zwischen Weissen Haus und Pariser Platz – Washington und Berlin in Strategischer Allianz, in Ralph Thiele and Hans-Ulrich Seitz, eds., Heraus-Forderung Zukunft (Report Verlag, 1999).
- "The Dayton Peace Accords: Success or Failure?", in Kurt R. Spillmann and Joachim Krause, eds., International Security Challenges in a Changing World (Peter Lang, 1999) ISBN 978-3-906763-68-2.
- "NATO After the Cold War, 1991–1996: Institutional Competition and the Collapse of the French Alternative," Contemporary European History, Vol 7, Part 3 (November 1998).
- "Beyond Russia and China: A Survey of Threats to U.S. Security from Lesser States," in Challenging the United States Symmetrically and Asymmetrically: Can America Be Defeated?, Lloyd J. Matthews, ed., (U.S. Army War College, July 1998).
- Europe After NATO Expansion: The Unfinished Security Agenda (Policy Paper #38, Institute on Global Conflict and Cooperation, February 1998).
- "The Breakup of Yugoslavia," in Roderick K. von Lipsey, ed., Breaking the Cycle: A Framework for Conflict Resolution (St. Martin's Press, 1997) ISBN 978-0-312-16253-5.
- "The Berlin Crises of 1948–49 and 1958–62," in Beatrice Heuser and Robert O’Neill, eds., Securing Peace in Europe, 1945–1962 (MacMillan, 1992) ISBN 978-0-312-06217-0.
