= John Noonan (analyst) =

American conservative national security commentator and analyst

- Education: Virginia Military Institute Fishburne Military School
- Occupations: National security analyst Writer
- Political party: Republican

John Noonan is an American conservative national security commentator and analyst. He was the national security policy advisor to Jeb Bush during his presidential campaign, and foreign policy advisor and speechwriter for Mitt Romney in 2012. He was a principal defense writer for The Weekly Standard and a policy director of the Foreign Policy Initiative.

Before moving to the FPI, the then Captain Noonan served in the United States Air Force's Global Strike Command as a Minuteman III launch officer. While still on active duty, he started a defense blog for Military.com called OPFOR (a military acronym for "opposing force"). OPFOR was one of the first military blogs drawn on by Michael Goldfarb of the Weekly Standard to refute the war reporting of Scott Beauchamp in 2007. Later that year, Noonan joined the Standard as a defense stringer and blogger. He is the second military blogger, after the blog's Andrew Exum joined the Center for a New American Security, to assimilate into Washington's influential defense policy community.

Noonan has drawn fire from liberal and progressive groups for his foreign policy positions, particularly on US nuclear weapon issues. In June 2010, the position of Noonan and others on the Obama administration's Nuclear Posture Review was criticized by the Institute for Policy Studies. He assumed a hawkish posture on the 2008 South Ossetia War, calling the refusal of European nations to admit Georgia into NATO the result of "Chamberlain-esque conflict aversion."

His practical experience working with nuclear weapons placed him in a point position for conservative opposition to President Obama's nuclear disarmament initiatives, as has his ability to accurately project the outcome of certain geopolitical events such as the recent wars in Lebanon and Georgia. On the topic of nuclear deterrence, in 2010 he listed reasons why the Obama administration should modernize the US nuclear arsenal.

Noonan was involved in the movement to recruit retired Marine Corps General James Mattis to be the 2016 Republican presidential nominee.

In August 2016, Noonan wrote in an op-ed for the Los Angeles Times that Republican presidential candidate Donald Trump "cannot be trusted with weapons that can kill millions. He cannot be handed the nuclear 'football' – a briefcase containing the war plans and codes for our nuclear forces—and be made responsible for its contents." His editorial followed a series of posts on Twitter expressing the same sentiments. Noonan is one of several dozen Republican security officials who signed an open letter pledging not to support Trump for president.

== See also ==
- Stop Trump movement
