= The Weekly Standard =

US opinion magazine (1995–2018)

- December 24, 2018 issue of The Weekly Standard
- Editor: Stephen F. Hayes
- Frequency: Weekly
- Publisher: Terry Eastland
- Total circulation: ~50,000 (December 2018)
- First issue: September 1995; 31 years ago
- Final issue: December 2018; 7 years ago
- Company: Clarity Media Group
- Country: United States
- Based in: Washington, D.C.
- Language: English
- Website: Archived 31 December 2018 at the Wayback Machine
- ISSN: 1083-3013

The Weekly Standard was an American neoconservative political magazine of news, analysis, and commentary that was published 48 times per year. Originally edited by founders Bill Kristol and Fred Barnes, the Standard was described as a "redoubt of neoconservatism" and as "the neocon bible." Its founding publisher, News Corporation, debuted the title on September 18, 1995. In 2009, News Corporation sold the magazine to a subsidiary of the Anschutz Corporation. On December 14, 2018, its owners announced that the magazine would cease publication, with the last issue to be published on December 17. Sources have attributed its demise to an increasing divergence between Kristol and other editors' shift towards anti-Trump positions on the one hand, and the magazine's audience's shift towards Trumpism on the other.

Many of the magazine's articles were written by members of conservative think tanks located in Washington, including the American Enterprise Institute, the Ethics and Public Policy Center, the Foundation for Defense of Democracies, the Hudson Institute, and the Foreign Policy Initiative. Individuals who wrote for the magazine included Elliott Abrams, Peter Berkowitz, John Bolton, Ellen Bork, David Brooks, Gertrude Himmelfarb, Christopher Hitchens, Harvey Mansfield, Cynthia Ozick, Joe Queenan, and John Yoo. The magazine's website also produced regular online-only commentaries and news articles.

== History ==
The Standard was located at 1150 17th Street, a building shared with other conservative organizations including the American Enterprise Institute. It was viewed as heavily influential during the administration of President George W. Bush (2001–2009), being called the in-flight magazine of Air Force One. In 2003, although the magazine's circulation was only 55,000, Kristol said that "We have a funny relationship with the top tier of the administration. They very much keep us at arm's length, but Vice President Dick Cheney does send over someone to pick up 30 copies of the magazine every Monday."

In 2006, though the publication had never been profitable and reputedly lost more than a million dollars a year, News Corporation head Rupert Murdoch initially dismissed the idea of selling it. Subsequently, in June 2009, a report circulated that a sale of the publication to Philip Anschutz was imminent, with Murdoch's position being that, having since purchased The Wall Street Journal in 2007, his interest in the smaller publication had diminished. The Washington Examiner reported that month that the Examiner's parent company, the Anschutz-owned Clarity Media Group, had purchased the Standard; the price was about $1 million.

The Standard increased its paid circulation by 39 percent between its June 2009 and June 2010 BPA statements. Its print circulation of about 100,000 in 2013 had decreased to 72,000 by 2017, according to the BPA, with circulation dropping about 10 percent between 2016 and 2017.

In late 2016, Kristol ended his time as editor-in-chief. He was replaced by Stephen Hayes, the magazine's senior writer. Under Hayes' leadership, the Standard continued to be as critical of Donald Trump as it had been under Kristol; Trump's supporters in turn criticized the Standard, and the magazine's influence in Republican circles dwindled.

In December 2017, The Weekly Standard became an official fact-checking partner for Facebook.

On December 14, 2018, Clarity Media Group announced that it would cease publication of the magazine after 23 years. While some speculated that the closure of The Weekly Standard was so Clarity Media's other magazine, the Washington Examiner, could absorb the Standard's subscribers, a statement from Clarity Media Group chairman Ryan McKibben said that such speculation was incorrect. Kristol attributed the magazine's demise to the hostility of supporters of the Donald Trump administration.

Articles on The Weekly Standard are archived in the Washington Examiner.

=== Support of the invasion of Iraq ===
The Standard promoted and supported the invasion of Iraq to remove Saddam Hussein. In November 1997 Bill Kristol and Robert Kagan wrote an editorial titled "Saddam Must Go", in which they stated "We know it seems unthinkable to propose another ground attack to take Baghdad. But it's time to start thinking the unthinkable."

In the first issue the magazine published after 9/11, according to Scott McConnell of The American Conservative, "Gary Schmitt and Tom Donnelly, two employees of Kristol’s PNAC, clarified what ought to be the country’s war aims. Their rhetoric was to link Saddam Hussein and Osama bin Laden in virtually every paragraph, to join them at the hip in the minds of readers, and then to lay out a strategy that actually gave attacking Saddam priority over eliminating al-Qaeda."

On December 16, 2018, co-founder and contributing editor John Podhoretz defended the coverage answering the question by Lulu Garcia-Navarro on NPR: "Do you regret the coverage of Iraq War?" saying "I think, basically, what—all a magazine—editors, writers—can promise is that they will be honest and say what they mean and think and argue the best way that they can. And with the facts available at the time, that is what The Standard did."

=== Libel case ===
In 1997, nearly a year after a cover story that included allegations of hiring a prostitute and plagiarism against best-selling author Deepak Chopra, the editors of The Weekly Standard accepted full responsibility for the errors in the story, and apologized." Chopra claimed that the magazine settled for $1.6 million.

== Notable personnel ==
=== Editorial staff ===
- Stephen F. Hayes, Editor-in-Chief
- Bill Kristol, Editor at large
- Fred Barnes, Executive Editor
- Christopher Caldwell, Andrew Ferguson, Lee Smith, Philip Terzian, Senior Editors
- Jonathan V. Last, Digital Editor
- Matt Labash, Senior Writer
- David Brooks, Senior Editor

=== Contributing editors ===
- Max Boot
- Joseph Bottum
- Tucker Carlson
- Matthew Continetti
- Joseph Epstein
- David Frum
- David Gelernter
- Reuel Marc Gerecht
- Michael Goldfarb
- Mary Katharine Ham
- Brit Hume
- Frederick Kagan
- Robert Kagan
- Charles Krauthammer
- Tod Lindberg
- Rob Messenger
- P. J. O'Rourke
- John Podhoretz
- Irwin Stelzer
