= 1150 17th Street =

1150 17th Street NW
- 1150 17th Street undergoing demolition in 2017
- Former names: MCI Building

General information
- Architectural style: Modernist
- Coordinates: 38.9053°N 77.0388°W
- Completed: 1970
- Closed: 2016
- Demolished: 2017
- Owner: Vornado/Charles E. Smith

Technical details
- Floor count: 12

Design and construction
- Architect: Edwin Weihe

1150 17th Street NW, known prior to 1981 as the MCI Building, was an office building in downtown Washington, D.C., United States. It was known for being the headquarters for several conservative movement organizations, particularly the American Enterprise Institute, which occupied the top three floors of the building from 1971 until 2016. Other conservative organizations and media outlets based in the building were The Weekly Standard, the Project for the New American Century and the Philanthropy Roundtable. The building was noted by commentators as being an "intellectual hub" for conservative ideas, particularly during the presidency of George W. Bush, when AEI and Weekly Standard personnel influenced the administration's Iraq War policy and tax policy, among other issues.

Located on the southwest corner of 17th and M Streets NW, 1150 17th Street was built by developer Charles Smith and completed in 1970. Prior to 1981, it was the headquarters for MCI Communications. AEI moved to the building in 1971. After AEI acquired a new facility and vacated its space in 2016, the building was closed, demolished and replaced with a new office building.

== History ==
1150 17th Street was built in 1970 to a design by Edwin Weihe. It was one of several commercial office buildings in the Washington area developed by Charles Smith. Prior to 1981, the building served as the headquarters of MCI Communications and was known as the MCI Building. In the 1980s, the National Geographic Society (whose headquarters was located across 17th Street) leased space in the building. The building was owned by Charles E. Smith, later part of the Vornado Realty Trust.

The American Enterprise Institute moved to the building in 1971. During his years affiliated with AEI during his post-presidency, former U.S. President Gerald Ford worked in the building. AEI occupied the top three floors—the 10th, 11th and 12th. The institute announced in 2013 that it had purchased the Andrew Mellon Building for its headquarters and that it would be vacating its space at 1150 17th Street.

AEI vacated 1150 17th Street in August 2016, and the building was closed to prepare for demolition and replacement by a new building. While being prepared for demolition, the building caught fire on November 8, 2016, the night Donald Trump was elected president of the United States.

== Tenants ==
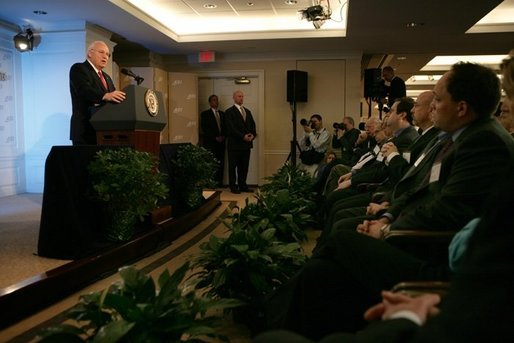
Vice President Dick Cheney delivers an address on the Iraq War at AEI in 2005.

Photographers capture an antiwar protest outside 1150 17th Street in 2009.

1150 17th Street was known for being the location of several conservative movement organizations, principally AEI, but also The Weekly Standard, the Project for the New American Century, the Foreign Policy Initiative, the Philanthropy Roundtable, the Searle Freedom Trust and the Committee on the Present Danger. The offices of the Ethics and Public Policy Center, The Public Interest and the Hoover Institution's Policy Review were located in adjacent or nearby buildings.

Commentators from both right and left have described the building as a center for conservative ideas. In The Right, Matthew Continetti described arriving for his first day of work at The Weekly Standard and called 1150 17th Street "more than an office building. It was an intellectual hub—the frontal cortex of the American right. . . . From 1150 Seventeenth Street emanated the ideas that shaped the Republican White House and Congress and then the world. . . . Taxes had been cut, welfare reformed, social programs redesigned and governments toppled because of the intellection that took place within the walls of 1150 Seventeenth Street."

John Micklethwait and Adrian Wooldridge of The Economist said that the building's appearance as a standard-issue office building was belied by "contain[ing] more conservative brainpower than the average European country." Slate's Timothy Noah described the building as "the Alamo of American conservatism" and said that "[w]hat the corner of Haight and Ashbury was to the Summer of Love, 17th and M is to the Autumn of Pre-emption."

During the George W. Bush administration, organizations based at 1150 17th Street reached the zenith of influence. AEI and The Weekly Standard helped build the case for the Iraq War and, later, the Iraq War troop surge strategy. AEI economic policy staff helped design the 2003 tax cuts, and AEI's Leon Kass chaired the President's Council on Bioethics. Vice President Dick Cheney sent a staffer to the building each week to pick up 30 copies of the Standard. Cheney also used AEI as a venue for a major 2009 speech criticizing the Barack Obama administration's approach to counterterrorism.

However, the influence of organizations based at 1150 17th Street waned during the Barack Obama presidency and the rise of Donald Trump. Continetti said the 2016 fire was a metaphor for the fate of the conservative establishment represented by AEI and other institutions based at 1150 17th Street. "The center of gravity of American conservatism drifted toward Capitol Hill, where the Heritage Foundation, the Kirby Center of Hillsdale College and the Claremont Institute's Center for the American Way of Life hosted scholars and speakers friendly to the administration of former President Donald Trump," Continetti wrote. "The right became more populist than it was in 2003. To define oneself as a conservative in the 2020s was to reject the ideas and practices of the 'establishment' that 1150 Seventeenth Street had come to represent."

Left-of-center Slate magazine's first D.C. bureau was subleased from AEI in the building in an arrangement brokered by longtime AEI scholar and Slate contributor Herbert Stein. The National Air Traffic Controllers Association was also a tenant in the building.
