= John Searle (businessman) =

American heir, businessman and philanthropist (1901–1978)

John G. Searle
- Born: March 18, 1901; Sabula, Iowa, U.S.
- Died: March 21, 1978 (aged 77); Hobe Sound, Florida, U.S.
- Education: University of Michigan (BS)
- Occupations: Businessman, philanthropist
- Children: Daniel C. Searle
- Parent: Claude Howard Searle
- Relatives: Gideon Daniel Searle (paternal grandfather)

John Gideon Searle (1901–1978) was an American heir, businessman and philanthropist.

== Early life ==
John Gideon Searle was born March 18, 1901, in Sabula, Iowa. His paternal grandfather was Gideon Daniel Searle, founder of G. D. Searle & Company in 1888. His father, Claude Howard Searle, served as president of the family business after his grandfather's death in 1917. He began working for the family business at the age of fourteen, working every summer through high school and college. He graduated from the University of Michigan with a Bachelor of Science in pharmacy.

== Business career ==
At Searle, he worked as a buyer in 1923, and then was appointed office manager and treasurer. In 1931, he became vice president and general manager of Searle, up until 1966. To remain competitive during the Great Depression, he reduced its product lines and focused on successful products such as Aminophyllin, Metamucil and Dramamine. He also launched the first oral contraceptive drug Enovid in 1957. He moved its headquarters to Skokie, Illinois, in 1942.

In 1966, his son Daniel C. Searle became president of Searle. His other son, William L. Searle, as well as his son-in-law, Wes Dixon, also worked for the company.

== Philanthropy ==
In 1964, he set up the Searle Fund at the Chicago Community Trust. The Searle Family Trust later created the Searle Scholars Program.

He was inducted in the American National Business Hall of Fame. Northwestern University and Yale University have endowed professorships named for him. The John G. Searle Chair at the American Enterprise Institute, named in his honor, is currently held by Michael R. Strain. Assistant professorships named after Searle exist in all departments at the University of Michigan School of Public Health.

== Death ==
John G. Searle died on March 21, 1978, in Hobe Sound, Florida.
