= Searle Freedom Trust =

Conservative grant-making foundation located in the United States

- Founder: Daniel C. Searle
- Established: 1998, closed 2025
- Mission: "To support work that will lead to a more just, free, and prosperous society"
- President: Kimberly O. Dennis
- Endowment: $54.5 million (2023)
- Formerly called: D & D Foundation
- Address: 1150 17th Street
- Location: Washington, D.C., U.S.

The Searle Freedom Trust was a 501(c)(3) grant-making foundation located in the United States. It was established by business executive Daniel C. Searle in 1998. The Searle Freedom Trust closed in 2025. Prior to winding down operations, the organization had donated over $200 million to conservative non-profits.

== Origins ==
Searle considered himself a free enterprise conservative and desired to support organizations with similar views. The source of the trust's endowment was money inherited from pharmaceutical company G.D. Searle, LLC, whose best-known products included Metamucil, Dramamine, NutraSweet, and Enovid, the first female oral contraceptive.

== Leadership ==
The president of the Searle Freedom Trust was Kimberly O. Dennis. She was previously executive director of SFT's predecessor, the D & D Foundation. She heads the board of Donors Trust, is an Earhart Foundation trustee, is on the board of Property and Environment Research Center, and was the first executive director of the Philanthropy Roundtable. Previous positions include director of National Research Initiative Competitive Grants Program and work at the John M. Olin Foundation. She received the 2019 Roe Award from the State Policy Network and the 2009-10 Arthur Vining Davis Award from Rollins College.

== Grantees ==
Grantees of the Trust included conservative and libertarian public policy organizations. Daniel Searle was one of the largest donors to the American Enterprise Institute and the largest in his last two decades. The trust also donated to the Cato Institute, The Heritage Foundation, the Manhattan Institute for Policy Research, the Pacific Research Institute, the Reason Foundation, the State Policy Network, the Federalist Society, Philanthropy Roundtable, the Institute for Humane Studies, the Collegiate Network, and the Political Theory Project at Brown University, and Donors Trust; Searle Freedom Trust funded the Dean Searle Fellowship in Economics at Donors Trust.

The Trust donated to the American Legislative Exchange Council (ALEC), giving $735,000 to the organization between 2000 and 2013.

According to a 2013 analysis by the Center for Public Integrity, the Trust was among the most frequent sponsors of the attendance of federal judges to judicial educational seminars.

In 2013, the member organizations in the State Policy Network sought funding from the Trust. In December 2013, The Guardian, in collaboration with The Texas Observer and the Portland Press Herald, obtained, published and analyzed 40 of the grant proposals. According to The Guardian, the proposals documented a coordinated strategy across 34 states, "a blueprint for the conservative agenda in 2014." The reports described the grant proposals in six states as proposing campaigns to cut pay to state government employees; oppose public sector collective bargaining; reduce public sector services in education and healthcare; promote school vouchers; oppose efforts to combat greenhouse gas emissions; reduce or eliminate income and sales taxes; and study a proposed block grant reform to Medicare.

The Trust granted, via Donors Trust, $597,500 between 2005 and 2010, $650,000 in 2013, and $500,000 in 2015, to fund the Project on Fair Representation, a Washington, D.C.–based legal defense fund that recruited plaintiffs in lawsuits to challenge affirmative action in college admissions policies, including the United States Supreme Court case Fisher v. University of Texas and at Harvard University.

In 2016, Inside Philanthropy reported that Searle had given grants to "compile research questioning the scientific consensus on climate change." The organization has also been reported as a leading funder of climate science denial advocacy groups by Scientific American and E&E News.
