= Jamie Fly =

American business executive

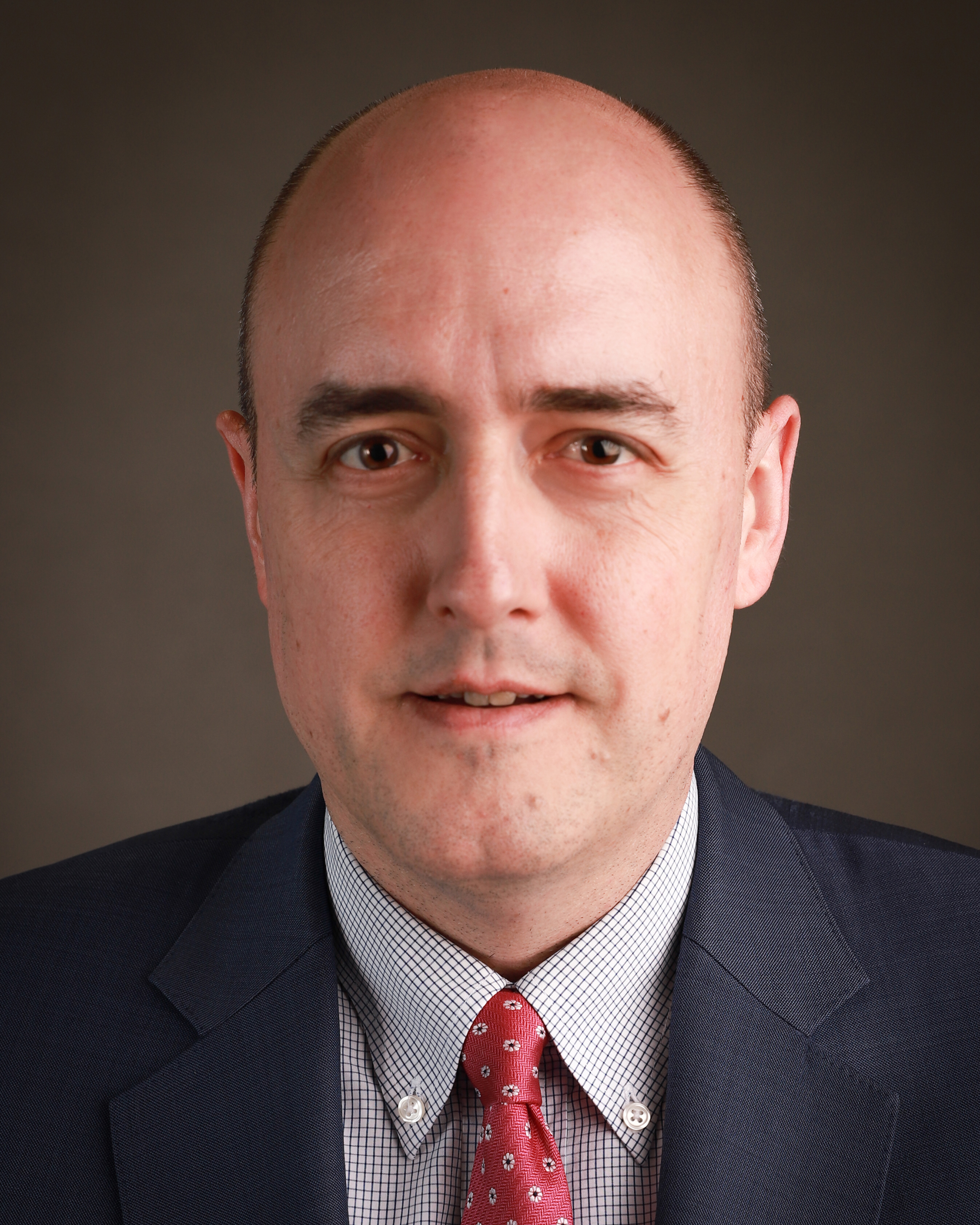
- Education: American University (BA), Georgetown University (MA)
- Occupation: Executive
- Employer: Freedom House
- Honors: Office of the Secretary of Defense Medal for Exceptional Public Service

Jamie M. Fly is chief executive officer (CEO) of Freedom House.

== Education ==
Fly holds a BA in international studies and political science from American University and a MA in German and European studies from Georgetown University.

== Career ==
From 2002 to 2004, he worked on European and national security issues as a research associate at the Council on Foreign Relations. In 2004 he was a German Marshall Fund Manfred Wörner Fellow. He also worked at the World Bank and for the Republican National Committee on the 2004 re-election campaign of the 43rd president of the United States George W. Bush. From 2005 to 2008, Fly served in the office of the United States Secretary of Defense. He received the Office of the Secretary of Defence Medal for Exceptional Public Service. From 2008 to 2009, he served as director of counterproliferation strategy at the United States National Security Council in the Bush's administration. In 2009 he was a Claremont Institute Lincoln Fellow. From early 2009 to February 2013 Fly served as the executive director of the Foreign Policy Initiative (FPI). From February 2013 to May 2017 he served as counselor for Foreign and National Security Affairs to Senator Marco Rubio (R-FL). He also served as a senior fellow and co-director of the Alliance for Securing Democracy.

From August 2019 to June 2020, he served as president and chief executive officer for Radio Free Europe/Radio Liberty (RFE/RL). From September 2020 to February 2021, he served as director of the Future of Geopolitics and Asia programs at the German Marshall Fund. He researched transatlantic relations, American foreign policy, democracy and human rights. From February 2021 to June 2023 Fly served as president and CEO for RFE/RL.

In May 2023, Fly announced his resignation as RFE president and CEO, effective June 30, 2023, and expressed the intent of returning to the U.S. for an opportunity in the private sector. In August 2023, he started at Palantir Technologies full-time as a senior counselor.. He has served as CEO of Freedom House since February 2026.

Fly is a member of the Council on Foreign Relations.

== Publications ==
=== Congressional testimonies ===
- Written Statement of Jamie Fly, President and CEO of Radio Free Europe/Radio Liberty, Senate Foreign Relations Committee, June 9, 2021

=== Articles ===
- How Silicon Valley Can Protect U.S. Democracy, Foreign Affairs, April 22, 2019 (co-authored with Laura Rosenberger)
- Mike Pompeo Needs to Clean Up After Rex Tillerson, Foreign Policy, April 24, 2018 (co-authored with Richard Fontaine)
- Two Cheers for European Defense Cooperation, Foreign Policy, March 9, 2018
- Trump’s China Policy Must Look Beyond North Korea, Foreign Policy, July 25, 2017
- Obama Is Unwilling to Lead the U.S. Response to the Arab Spring, US News & World Report, September 27, 2012
- Obama Should Pressure Iran, Not Israel, US News & World Report, March 15, 2012
- Case for Intervention in Syria Stronger than in Libya, US News & World Report, February 14, 2012
- The Case For Regime Change in Iran, Foreign Affairs, January 17, 2012 (co-authored with Gary Schmitt)
- Military Action Might Be The Only Option With Iran, US News & World Report, November 15, 2011
- Obama's Iran Election Ineptitude Worsens Nuclear Threat, US News & World Report, June 19, 2009
