= MCI Building =

MCI Building may refer to:

- 707 17th Street, formerly known as the MCI Building, Denver, Colorado
- 1150 17th Street, formerly known as the MCI Building, Washington, D.C.

== See also ==
- MCI Center (Washington, D.C.)
- MCI Center (Los Angeles)
