= Eliana Johnson =

American journalist (born c.1984)

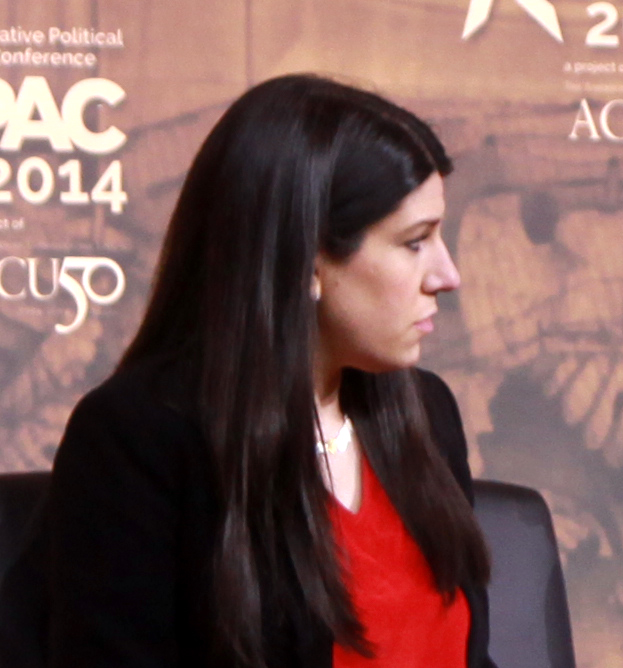
- Johnson in 2014
- Born: Eliana Yael Johnson; 1984 (age 41–42); Twin Cities, Minnesota, U.S.
- Education: Yale University (BA)
- Spouse: Patrick Worman

Eliana Yael Johnson (born c. 1984) is an American conservative journalist and editor-in-chief of the Washington Free Beacon.

== Early life and education ==
Johnson is the daughter of Sally (née Zusman) and Scott W. Johnson, one of the three Dartmouth lawyers who founded Power Line, an American political blog publication. She is of Jewish and Peruvian descent. She was raised in the Twin Cities area of Minnesota. In 2006, she graduated with a B.A. in history from Yale University.

== Career ==
Johnson previously worked as a producer at Fox News on Sean Hannity's television program Hannity and as a staff reporter at The New York Sun.

In August 2014, after two years with National Review, she was promoted from media editor to Washington editor replacing Robert Costa, who had left to join The Washington Post in November 2013.

In November 2016, she became national political reporter at Politico.

In September 2019, Johnson was named editor-in-chief of the Washington Free Beacon, succeeding founding editor Matthew Continetti.

In 2025, Johnson was invited to participate in the nominating jury for the Pulitzer Prize for National Reporting. After Palestinian writer Mosab Abu Toha received the Pulitzer Prize for Commentary for his essays about the Gaza war in The New Yorker, Johnson questioned the prize board about Toha's Facebook posts mocking Israeli hostages of the October 7 attacks. In response, Pulitzer administrator Marjorie Miller accused Johnson of violating her confidentiality agreement; Johnson denied this, saying that the agreement did not cover reporting on the board's activities in a separate category.
