= Foreign Policy Institute =

Foreign Policy Institute may refer to:

- Foreign Policy Institute (Turkey)
- Foreign Policy Institute (SAIS), Washington, D.C., United States
- Foreign Policy Research Institute, Philadelphia, Pennsylvania, United States

== See also ==
- Foreign Policy Initiative, Washington, D.C., United States
