= Bill Kristol =

American political commentator and government official (born 1952)

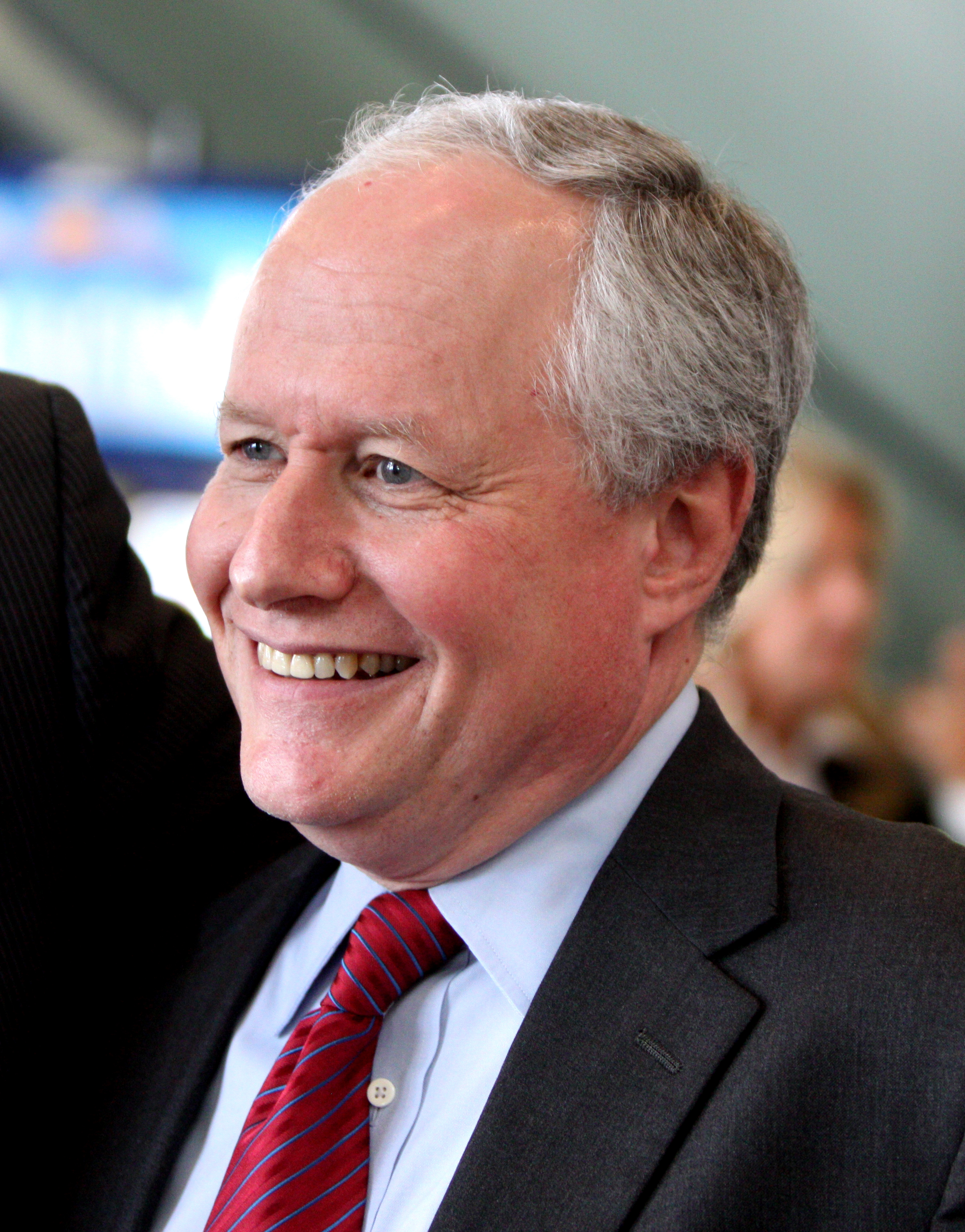
- Kristol in 2011

Assistant to the President Chief of Staff to the Vice President
- In office January 20, 1989 – January 20, 1993
- Vice President: Dan Quayle
- Preceded by: Craig Fuller
- Succeeded by: Roy Neel

Personal details
- Born: William Kristol; December 23, 1952 (age 73) New York City, New York, U.S.
- Party: Republican (1985–2020); Independent (2021–2026); Democratic (2026–present)
- Spouse: Susan Scheinberg (m. 1975)
- Children: 3
- Parents: Irving Kristol (father); Bea Himmelfarb (mother)
- Relatives: Matthew Continetti (son-in-law); Milton Himmelfarb (uncle)
- Education: Harvard University (BA, PhD)

William Kristol (/ˈkrɪstəl/; born December 23, 1952) is an American neoconservative writer. A frequent commentator on several networks including CNN, he was the founder and editor-at-large of the political magazine The Weekly Standard. Kristol is editor-at-large of the news and opinion website The Bulwark and is among the editors of its Substack publication that bears the same name. Since 2014, he has been the host of Conversations with Bill Kristol, an interview web program.

Kristol played a leading role in the defeat of the Clinton health care plan of 1993, as well as for advocating the 2003 invasion of Iraq. He has been associated with a number of conservative think tanks. He was chairman of the New Citizenship Project from 1997 to 2005. In 1997, he co-founded the Project for the New American Century (PNAC) with Robert Kagan. He was a member of the board of trustees for the free-market Manhattan Institute for Policy Research until 2022 and a director of the Foreign Policy Initiative, which dissolved in 2017. He is also one of the three board members of Keep America Safe, a national-security think tank co-founded by Liz Cheney and Debra Burlingame, and serves on the boards of the Emergency Committee for Israel and of the Susan B. Anthony List (as of 2010).

Kristol is a critic of president Donald Trump, a supporter of the Never Trump movement, and a founder and director of Defending Democracy Together, an advocacy organization responsible for such projects as Republicans for the Rule of Law and the Republican Accountability Project.

== Early life and education ==
William Kristol was born on December 23, 1952, in New York City into a Jewish family, the son of Irving Kristol and Gertrude Himmelfarb. Irving Kristol was an editor and publisher who served as the managing editor of Commentary magazine, founded the magazine The Public Interest, and was described by Jonah Goldberg as the "godfather of neoconservatism". Gertrude Himmelfarb was a prominent conservative historian, especially of intellectual history in the U.S. and Great Britain.

Kristol attended Collegiate School for Boys in Manhattan. Then at Harvard University he received a bachelor's degree in government in 1973 and a Ph.D. in political science in 1979.

== Career ==
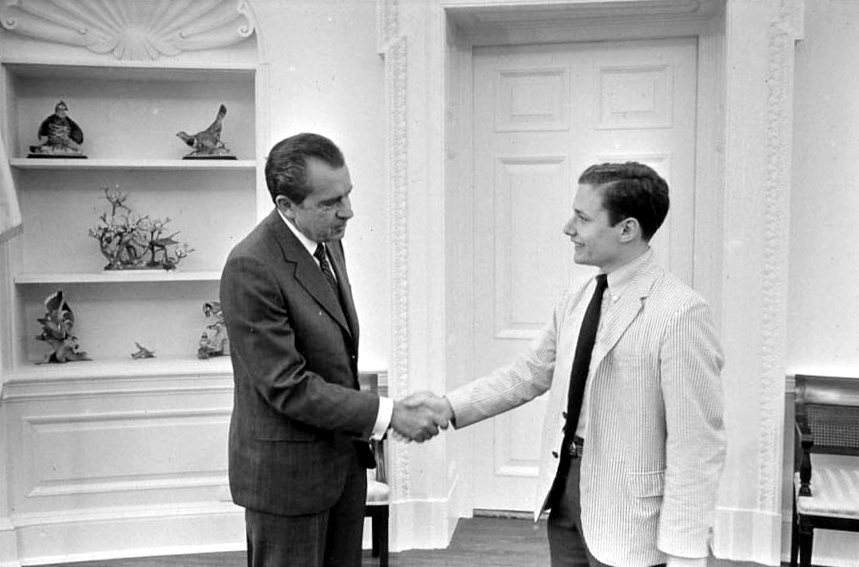
Kristol with President Richard Nixon in 1970

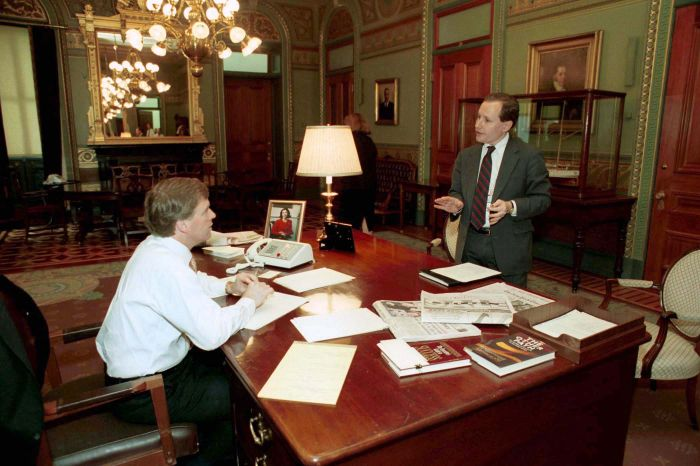
Kristol with Vice President Dan Quayle in 1989

In the summer of 1970, Kristol was an intern at the White House. In 1976, Kristol worked for Daniel Patrick Moynihan's United States Senate campaign, serving as deputy issues director during the Democratic primary. In 1988, he was the campaign manager for Alan Keyes's unsuccessful Maryland Senatorial campaign against Paul Sarbanes. After teaching political philosophy and U.S. politics at the University of Pennsylvania and Harvard's Kennedy School of Government, Kristol went to work in government in 1985, serving as chief of staff to United States secretary of education William Bennett during the Reagan administration, and later, as chief of staff to the vice president under Dan Quayle in the George H. W. Bush administration. The New Republic dubbed Kristol "Dan Quayle's brain" when he was appointed the vice president's chief of staff.

Kristol served as chairman of the Project for the Republican Future from 1993 to 1994, and as the director of the Bradley Project at the Bradley Foundation in Milwaukee in 1993. In 1993, he led conservative opposition to the Clinton health care plan of 1993. In 2003, Kristol and Lawrence F. Kaplan wrote The War Over Iraq: America's Mission and Saddam's Tyranny, in which the authors analyzed the Bush Doctrine and the history of Iraqi-U.S. relations. In the book, Kristol and Kaplan provided support and justifications for the 2003 invasion of Iraq. He also served as a foreign policy advisor for Senator John McCain's presidential campaign.

=== Media commentator ===
After the Republican sweep of both houses of Congress in 1994, Kristol established, along with John Podhoretz, the conservative news magazine The Weekly Standard. Rupert Murdoch, chairman and managing director of News Corp., financed its creation. Beginning in 1996, Kristol was a panelist on the ABC Sunday news program This Week. Three years later, following declining ratings his contract was not renewed.

Kristol was a columnist for Time in 2007. The following year, he joined the New York Times as a columnist. Several days after he joined the Times, its public editor Clark Hoyt called his hiring "a mistake" because of Kristol's assertion in 2006 that the newspaper should potentially be prosecuted for having revealed information about the Terrorist Finance Tracking Program. Kristol wrote a weekly opinion column for the New York Times from January 7, 2008, to January 26, 2009.

For ten years, Kristol was a regular panelist on Fox News Sunday and often contributed to the nightly program Special Report with Bret Baier. In 2013, his contract with Fox News expired, and he became a commentator on several other networks, including ABC, NBC, CNN, and MSNBC. It was announced on This Week with George Stephanopoulos on February 2, 2014, that Kristol would be a contributor for ABC News and to that program.

=== Podcast ===
Since the summer of 2014, Kristol has hosted an online interview program, Conversations with Bill Kristol, featuring guests from academic and public life.

The series debuted in 2014. It is programming of the Foundation for Constitutional Government, a nonprofit organization devoted to promoting the study of politics and political philosophy. Each episode of Conversations with Bill Kristol features an interview. The program is longform, often more than an hour. The series has hosted a diverse roster of guests, from scholars and journalists to political strategists and public intellectuals. Notable regular guests including Garry Kasparov, Anne Applebaum, Harvey Mansfield, and Larry Summers have been featured on the program. The program is produced by Kristol and Andy Zwick. Episodes are released biweekly.

== Political views ==
Kristol was key to the defeat of the Clinton health care plan of 1993. In the first of what would become many strategy memos written for Republican policymakers, Kristol said the party should "kill", not amend, President Clinton's health care plan. A later memorandum used the phrase "There is no health care crisis", which Senate Minority Leader Bob Dole used in his response to Clinton's 1994 State of the Union address.

Kristol was a leading proponent of the Iraq War. In 1998, he joined other foreign policy analysts in sending a letter to President Clinton urging a stronger posture against Iraq. Kristol argued that Saddam Hussein posed a grave threat to the United States and its allies: "The only acceptable strategy is one that eliminates the possibility that Iraq will be able to use or threaten to use weapons of mass destruction. In the near term, this means a willingness to undertake military action as diplomacy is clearly failing. In the long term, it means removing Saddam Hussein and his regime from power. That now needs to become the aim of American foreign policy." In 1998 he and Robert Kagan wrote a New York Times piece in which they said "bombing Iraq isn't enough" and called on Clinton to invade the country.

In the 2000 presidential election, Kristol supported John McCain. Answering a question from a PBS reporter about the Republican primaries, he said, "No. I had nothing against Governor Bush. I was inclined to prefer McCain. The reason I was inclined to prefer McCain was his leadership on foreign policy." After the Bush administration developed its response to the September 11, 2001 attacks, Kristol said: "We've just been present at a very unusual moment, the creation of a new American foreign policy." Kristol ardently supported the Bush administration's decision to go to war with Iraq. In 2003, he and Lawrence Kaplan wrote The War Over Iraq, in which he described reasons for removing Saddam. Kristol rejected comparisons to Vietnam and predicted a "two-month war, not an eight-year war" during a March 28 C-SPAN appearance.

As the military situation in Iraq began to deteriorate in 2004, Kristol argued for an increase in the number of U.S. troops in Iraq. He also wrote an op-ed strongly criticizing United States secretary of defense Donald Rumsfeld, saying he "breezily dodged responsibility" for planning mistakes made in the Iraq War, including insufficient troop levels. In September 2006, he and fellow commentator Rich Lowry wrote, "There is no mystery as to what can make the crucial difference in the battle of Baghdad: American troops." This was one of the early calls for what became the Iraq War troop surge of 2007 four months later. In December 2008, Kristol wrote that the surge was "opposed at the time by the huge majority of foreign policy experts, pundits, and pontificators," but that "most of them – and the man most of them are happy won the election, Barack Obama – now acknowledge the surge's success."

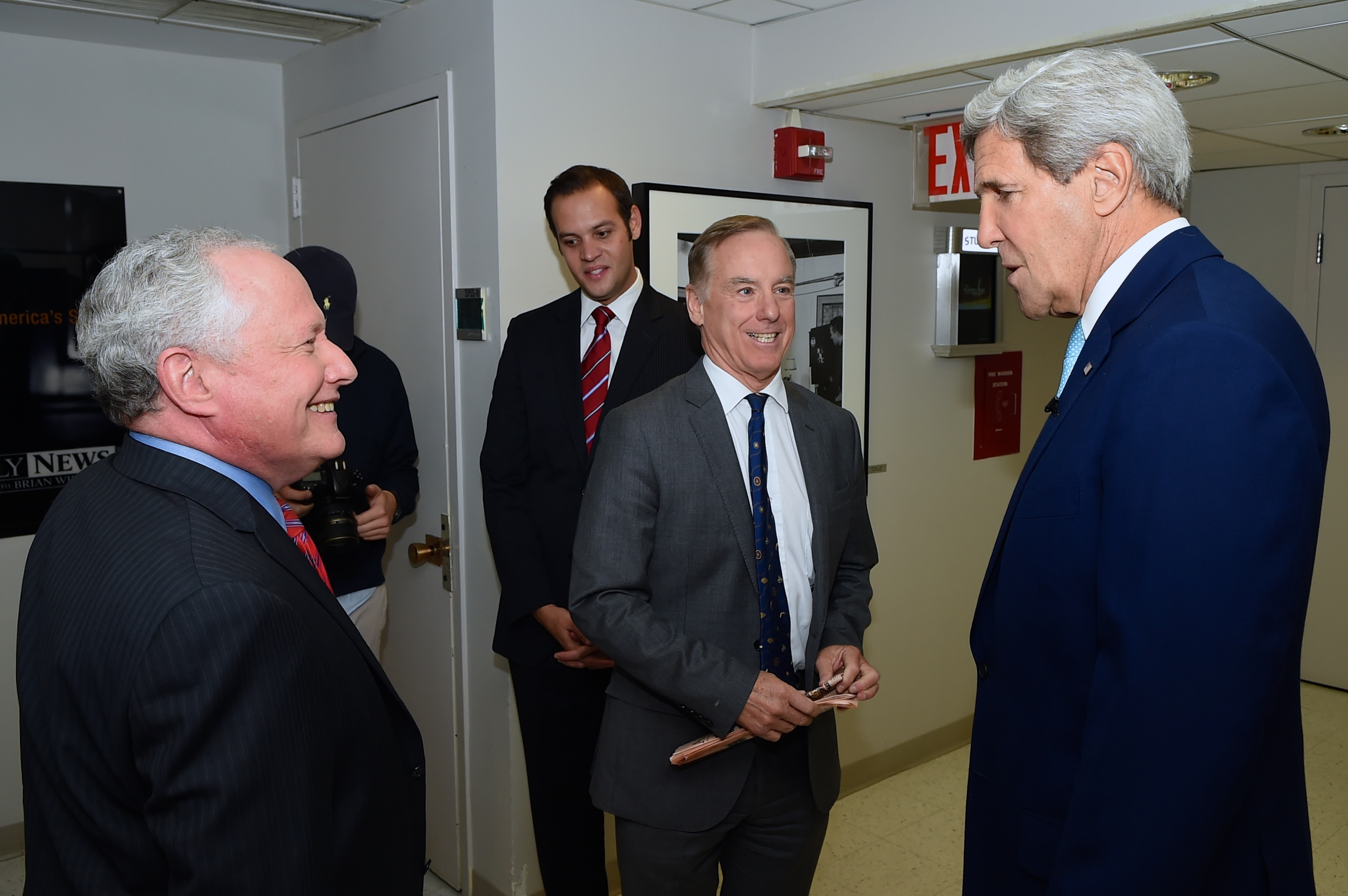
U.S. Secretary of State John Kerry with Kristol and former DNC Chairman Howard Dean before appearing on MSNBC's "Morning Joe" on September 22, 2014

Kristol was one of many conservatives to publicly oppose Bush's second U.S. Supreme Court nominee, Harriet Miers. "I'm disappointed, depressed, and demoralized," he said of Miers. "It is very hard to avoid the conclusion that President Bush flinched from a fight on constitutional philosophy. Miers is undoubtedly a decent and competent person. But her selection will unavoidably be judged as reflecting a combination of cronyism and capitulation on the part of the president." He was a vocal supporter of the 2006 Lebanon War, stating that the war is "our war too", referring to the United States. Kristol was an ardent promoter of Sarah Palin, advocating for her selection as the running mate of John McCain in the 2008 United States presidential election months before McCain chose her. However, he later recanted his support for her, saying: "I'm perfectly willing to say that given what I now know about her, she would not have been a good vice president."

In response to Iran's nuclear program, Kristol has supported strong sanctions. In June 2006, at the height of the Lebanon War, he suggested: "We might consider countering this act of Iranian aggression with a military strike against Iranian nuclear facilities. Why wait?" In 2010, Kristol criticized the Obama administration and Joint Chiefs of Staff chairman Admiral Mike Mullen for an unserious approach to Iran. He wrote: "The real question is what form of instability would be more dangerous – that caused by this Iranian government with nuclear weapons, or that caused by attacking this government's nuclear weapons program. It's time to have a serious debate about the choice between these two kinds of destabilization, instead of just refusing to confront the choice."

In the 2010 affair surrounding the disclosure of U.S. diplomatic cables by WikiLeaks, Kristol spoke strongly against the organization and suggested using "our various assets to harass, snatch, or neutralize Julian Assange and his collaborators, wherever they are." In March 2011, he wrote an editorial in The Weekly Standard arguing that the United States' military interventions in Muslim countries (including the Gulf War, the Kosovo War, the War in Afghanistan, and the Iraq War) should not be classified as "invasions," but rather as "liberations." Kristol backed President Barack Obama's decision to intervene in the Libyan Civil War in 2011 and urged fellow conservatives to support the action.

During the Iran–Israel war, Kristol in a New York Times interview asserted, "You’ve got to go to war with the president you have… If you really think Iran can’t have nuclear weapons, we have a chance to try to finish the job," signaling his support for military action against Iran despite concerns about presidential leadership. In a post on X, Kristol quoted The Atlantic by stating "Trump got this one right" after the United States launched strikes on three nuclear sites. Kristol also claimed that the neoconservative movement had been revived, tweeting "brb – starting up PNAC again…" after Trump appeared to endorse regime change for Iran in a post on Truth Social.

== Opposition to Donald Trump ==
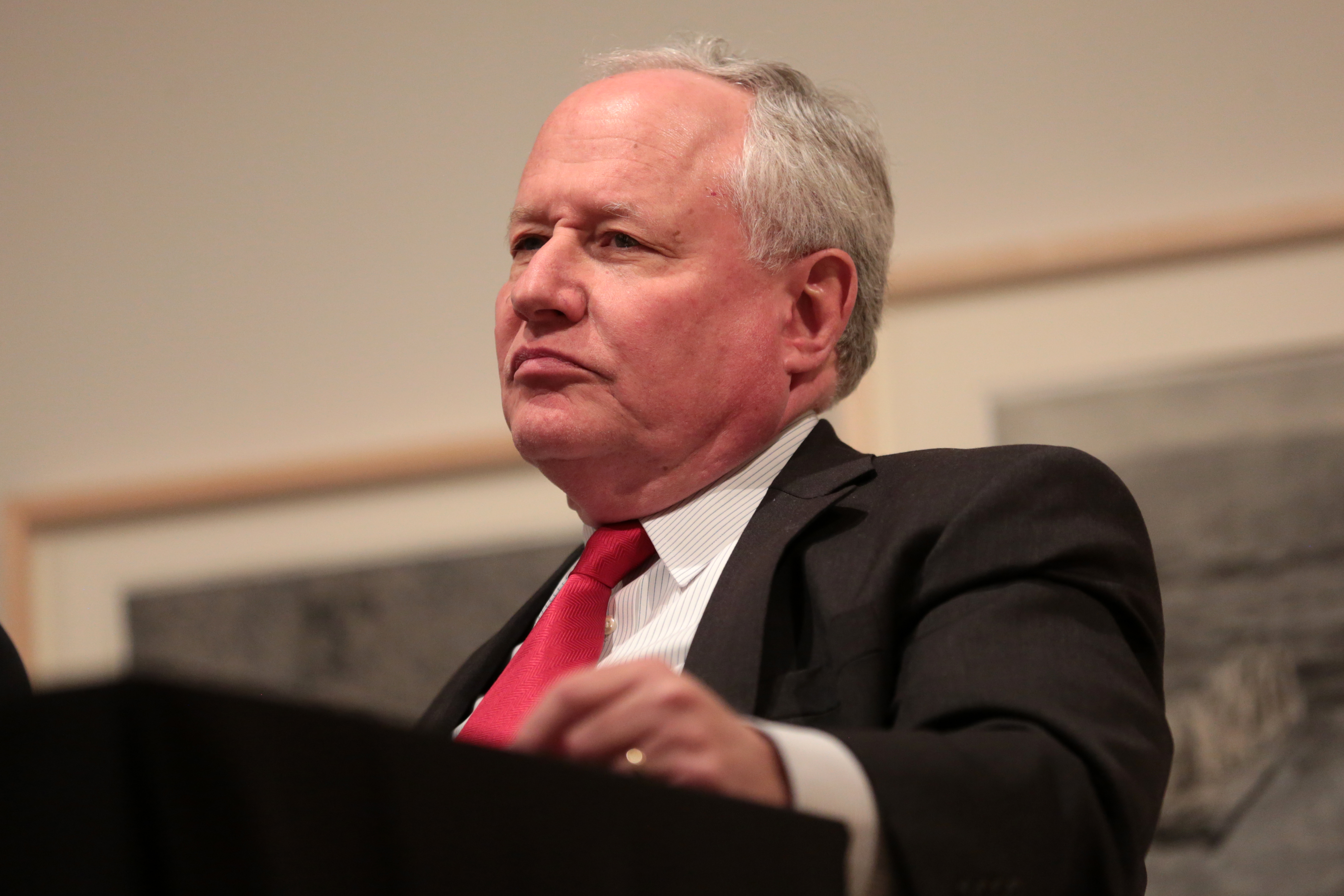
Orating, ASU, March 2017

Kristol vehemently opposed the nomination of Donald Trump as the Republican candidate for president in 2016. He has continued to express animosity toward the Trump administration's domestic and foreign policy aims, and dismay at conservative Republicans who have accommodated themselves to the first Trump administration.

In January 2019, Kristol criticized the Trump administration's planned withdrawal of U.S. troops from Syria and from Afghanistan. On December 21, Kristol and a group calling itself Republicans for the Rule of Law released an ad encouraging viewers to call their Senators to demand top Trump officials be forced to testify in his impeachment trial.

In March 2020, Kristol endorsed former U.S. vice president Joe Biden for President of the United States. Kristol is founding director of Republican Voters Against Trump, a project of Defending Democracy Together, launched in May 2020. On October 15, Kristol voted for the Democratic ticket. He stated: "Just filled out my early absentee ballot in VA for Joe Biden & Kamala Harris, Mark Warner, and Jennifer Wexton. No regrets at all about this."

In an interview with Jewish Insider in 2021, Kristol said that he identifies as more of a former Republican. Defending Democracy Together spent hundreds of thousands of dollars in January 2024 to support Nikki Haley and to run advertisements against Trump in the 2024 Republican presidential primary, the Washington Examiner reported. After the incumbent Vice President Kamala Harris replaced Biden as the Democratic nominee for U.S. president, Kristol endorsed her on The Bulwark.

Amidst the increase of the Trump administration's surge in deportation operations, and following the killings of Renée Good and Alex Pretti in Minneapolis, Kristol said:

Also, may I say that I don’t agree with people saying ICE and CBP need "more training." They’re doing exactly what this administration has trained them to—impose a reign of fear in blue cities. They don’t need more training. They need to be ripped up root and branch.

== Personal life ==
Since 1975, Kristol has been married to Susan Scheinberg, whom he met while they were both students at Harvard. Scheinberg holds a PhD in classics. The couple has three children. Their daughter, Anne, is married to writer Matthew Continetti, editor-in-chief of The Washington Free Beacon website. Their son, Joseph, served in the U.S. Marine Corps in Afghanistan and worked for the management consulting company McKinsey & Company before taking a job as legislative director for Senator Tom Cotton in 2018. Kristol lives in McLean, Virginia.

== Published works ==
- The Weekly Standard: A Reader: 1995–2005 (Harper Perennial, 2006). ISBN 0-06-088285-9
- War Over Iraq: Saddam's Tyranny And America's Mission (Co-author Lawrence F. Kaplan) (Encounter Books, 2003). ISBN 1-893554-69-4
- Bush v. Gore: The Court Cases and the Commentary (Co-editor E. J. Dionne) (Brookings Institution Press, 2001). ISBN 0-8157-0107-1
- Homosexuality and American Public Life (Introduction by Kristol, Editor Christopher Wolfe) (Spence Publishing Company, 1999). ISBN 978-1-890626-23-5

== Sources ==
- Johnson, Haynes and Broder, David. The System: the American way of politics at the breaking point. Boston: Little, Brown & Company, 1996.
- Current Biography Yearbook, 1997.
- Nina Easton, Gang of Five, Simon & Schuster, 2002.

Political offices
Preceded by Craig Fuller	Chief of Staff to the Vice President; 1989–1993	Succeeded by Roy Neel
