= Project for the New American Century =

1997–2006 American neoconservative think tank

- Formation: 1997; 29 years ago
- Founder: William Kristol, Robert Kagan
- Dissolved: 2006; 20 years ago
- Type: Public policy think tank
- Location: Washington, D.C.
- Chairman: William Kristol
- Directors: Robert Kagan; Devon Gaffney Cross; Bruce P. Jackson; John R. Bolton
- Website: newamericancentury.org (archived)

The Project for the New American Century (PNAC) was a neoconservative think tank based in Washington, D.C., that focused on United States foreign policy. It was established as a non-profit educational organization in 1997, and founded by William Kristol and Robert Kagan. PNAC's stated goal was "to promote American global leadership". The organization stated that "American leadership is good both for America and for the world", and sought to build support for "a Reaganite policy of military strength and moral clarity".

Of the twenty-five people who signed PNAC's founding statement of principles, ten went on to serve in the administration of U.S. President George W. Bush, including Dick Cheney, Donald Rumsfeld, and Paul Wolfowitz. Observers such as Irwin Stelzer and Dave Grondin have suggested that the PNAC played a key role in shaping the foreign policy of the Bush Administration, particularly in building support for the Iraq War. Academics such as Inderjeet Parmar, Phillip Hammond, and Donald E. Abelson have said PNAC's influence on the George W. Bush administration has been exaggerated.

The Project for the New American Century ceased to function in 2006; it was replaced by a new think-tank named the Foreign Policy Initiative, co-founded by Kristol and Kagan in 2009. The Foreign Policy Initiative was dissolved in 2017.

== Origins and operation ==
The Project for the New American Century developed from Kristol and Kagan's belief that the Republican Party lacked a "compelling vision for American foreign policy", which would allow Republican leaders to effectively criticize President Bill Clinton's foreign policy record.

During mid-1996, Kristol and Kagan co-authored an article in Foreign Affairs titled "Toward a Neo-Reaganite Foreign Policy" – referring to the foreign policy of President Ronald Reagan. In the article, they argued that American conservatives were "adrift" in the area of foreign policy, advocated a "more elevated vision of America's international role", and suggested that the United States' should adopt a stance of "benevolent global hegemony." In June 1997, Kristol and Kagan founded the PNAC in order to advance the goals they had first laid out in Foreign Affairs, echoing the article's statements and goals in PNAC's founding Statement of Principles.

According to Maria Ryan, the individuals who signed the PNAC's statements and letters were not employees or members of the group, and "supporters of PNAC's initiatives differed from case to case." While its permanent staff was relatively small, the organization was "especially well connected", with some of its statements and letters attracting the support of prominent conservatives and neoconservatives.

In this regard, Stuart Elden has stated that "The influence that PNAC had was astonishing", and noted that

The number of figures associated with PNAC that had been members of the Reagan or the first Bush administration and the number that would take up office with the administration of the second President Bush demonstrate that it is not merely a question of employees and budgets.

== Statement of Principles ==
PNAC's first public act was to release a "Statement of Principles" on June 3, 1997. The statement had 25 signers, including project members and outside supporters (see Signatories to Statement of Principles). It described the United States as the "world's pre-eminent power", and said that the nation faced a challenge to "shape a new century favorable to American principles and interests". To this goal, the statement's signers called for significant increases in defense spending, and for the promotion of "political and economic freedom abroad". It said the United States should strengthen ties with its democratic allies, "challenge regimes hostile to our interests and values", and preserve and extend "an international order friendly to our security, our prosperity, and our principles". Calling for a "Reaganite" policy of "military strength and moral clarity", it concluded that PNAC's principles were necessary "if the United States is to build on the successes of this past century and to ensure our security and our greatness in the next".

In September 2000 PNAC released "Rebuilding America's Defenses" a report that promotes "the belief that America should seek to preserve and extend its position of global leadership by maintaining the preeminence of U.S. military forces". The report states, "advanced forms of biological warfare that can 'target' specific genotypes may transform biological warfare from the realm of terror to a politically useful tool".

== Calls for regime change in Iraq ==
In 1998, Kristol and Kagan advocated regime change in Iraq throughout the Iraq disarmament process through articles that were published in the New York Times. Following perceived Iraqi unwillingness to co-operate with UN weapons inspections, core members of the PNAC including Richard Perle, Paul Wolfowitz, R. James Woolsey, Elliott Abrams, Donald Rumsfeld, Robert Zoellick, and John Bolton were among the signatories of an open letter initiated by the PNAC to President Bill Clinton calling for the removal of Saddam Hussein. Portraying Saddam Hussein as a threat to the United States, its Middle East allies, and oil resources in the region, and emphasizing the potential danger of any weapons of mass destruction under Iraq's control, the letter asserted that the United States could "no longer depend on our partners in the Gulf War to continue to uphold the sanctions or to punish Saddam when he blocks or evades UN inspections". Stating that American policy "cannot continue to be crippled by a misguided insistence on unanimity in the UN Security Council", the letter's signatories asserted that "the U.S. has the authority under existing UN resolutions to take the necessary steps, including military steps, to protect our vital interests in the Gulf". Believing that UN sanctions against Iraq would be an ineffective means of disarming Iraq, PNAC members also wrote a letter to Republican members of the U.S. Congress Newt Gingrich and Trent Lott, urging Congress to act, and supported the Iraq Liberation Act of 1998 (H.R. 4655) which President Clinton signed into law in October 1998.

In February 1998, some of the same individuals who had signed the PNAC letter in January also signed a similar letter to Clinton, from the bipartisan Committee for Peace and Security in the Gulf.

In January 1999, the PNAC circulated a memo that criticized the December 1998 bombing of Iraq in Operation Desert Fox as ineffective. The memo questioned the viability of Iraqi democratic opposition, which the U.S. was supporting through the Iraq Liberation Act, and referred to any "containment" policy as an illusion.

Shortly after the September 11 attacks, the PNAC sent a letter to President George W. Bush, specifically advocating regime change through "a determined effort to remove Saddam Hussein from power in Iraq". The letter suggested that "any strategy aiming at the eradication of terrorism and its sponsors must include a determined effort to remove Saddam Hussein from power in Iraq", even if no evidence linked Iraq to the September 11 attacks. The letter warned that allowing Hussein to remain in power would be "an early and perhaps decisive surrender in the war on international terrorism." From 2001 through the 2003 invasion of Iraq, the PNAC and many of its members voiced active support for military action against Iraq, and asserted leaving Saddam Hussein in power would be "surrender to terrorism".

Some have regarded the PNAC's January 16, 1998, letter to President Clinton urging "the removal of Saddam Hussein's regime from power", and the involvement of multiple PNAC members in the Bush Administration as evidence that the PNAC had a significant influence on the Bush Administration's decision to invade Iraq, or even argued that the invasion was a foregone conclusion. Writing in Der Spiegel in 2003, for example, Jochen Bölsche specifically referred to PNAC when he claimed that "ultra-rightwing US think-tanks" had been "drawing up plans for an era of American global domination, for the emasculation of the UN, and an aggressive war against Iraq" in "broad daylight" since 1998. Similarly, BBC journalist Paul Reynolds portrayed PNAC's activities and goals as key to understanding the foreign policy of the George W. Bush administration after September 11, 2001, suggesting that Bush's "dominant" foreign policy was at least partly inspired by the PNAC's ideas.

Some political scientists, historians, and other academics have been critical of many of these claims. Donald E. Abelson has written that scholars studying "PNAC's ascendancy" in the political arena "cannot possibly overlook the fact" that several of the signatories to PNAC's Statement of Purposes "received high level positions in the Bush administration", but that acknowledging these facts "is a far cry from making the claim that the institute was the architect of Bush's foreign policy".

== Rebuilding America's Defenses ==
One of the PNAC's most influential publications was a 90-page report titled Rebuilding America's Defenses: Strategies, Forces, and Resources For a New Century. Citing the PNAC's 1997 Statement of Principles, Rebuilding America's Defenses asserted that the United States should "seek to preserve and extend its position of global leadership" by "maintaining the preeminence of U.S. military forces." The report's primary author was Giselle Donnelly, then going by the first name Thomas. Donald Kagan and Gary Schmitt are credited as project chairmen. It also lists the names of 27 other participants who contributed papers or attended meetings related to the production of the report, six of whom subsequently assumed key defense and foreign policy positions in the Bush administration. It suggested that the preceding decade had been a time of peace and stability, which had provided "the geopolitical framework for widespread economic growth" and "the spread of American principles of liberty and democracy". The report warned that "no moment in international politics can be frozen in time; even a global Pax Americana will not preserve itself.

According to the report, current levels of defense spending were insufficient, forcing policymakers "to try ineffectually to 'manage' increasingly large risks". The result, it suggested, was a form "paying for today's needs by shortchanging tomorrow's; withdrawing from constabulary missions to retain strength for large-scale wars; 'choosing' between presence in Europe or presence in Asia; and so on". The report asserted that all of these were "bad choices" and "false economies", which did little to promote long-term American interests. "The true cost of not meeting our defense requirements", the report argued, "will be a lessened capacity for American global leadership and, ultimately, the loss of a global security order that is uniquely friendly to American principles and prosperity".

Rebuilding America's Defenses recommended establishing four core missions for US military forces: the defense of the "American homeland", the fighting and winning of "multiple, simultaneous major theatre wars", the performance of "'constabular' duties associated with shaping the security environment" in key regions, and the transformation of US forces "to exploit the 'revolution in military affairs'". Its specific recommendations included the maintenance of US nuclear superiority, an increase of the active personnel strength of the military from 1.4 to 1.6 million people, the redeployment of US forces to Southeast Europe and Asia, and the "selective" modernization of US forces. The report advocated the cancellation of "roadblock" programs such as the Joint Strike Fighter (which it argued would absorb "exorbitant" amounts of Pentagon funding while providing limited gains), but favored the development of "global missile defenses" and the control of "space and cyberspace", including the creation of a new military service with the mission of "space control". To help achieve these aims, Rebuilding America's Defenses advocated a gradual increase in military and defense spending "to a minimum level of 3.5 to 3.8 percent of gross domestic product, adding $15 billion to $20 billion to total defense spending annually. That amount is at least 17% to 19% or $355 billion to $386 billion of the US federal tax revenue in 2000 with annual increases of 4–6%.

== Critics ==
=== Rebuilding America's Defenses ===
Written before the September 11 attacks and during political debates of the Iraq War, a section of Rebuilding America's Defenses titled "Creating Tomorrow's Dominant Force" became the subject of considerable controversy: "Further, the process of transformation, even if it brings revolutionary change, is likely to be a long one, absent some catastrophic and catalyzing event – like a new Pearl Harbor." Journalist John Pilger pointed to this passage when he argued that the Bush administration had used the events of September 11 as an opportunity to capitalize on long-desired plans.

Some critics went further, asserting that Rebuilding America's Defenses should be viewed as a program for global American hegemony. Writing in Der Spiegel in 2003, Jochen Bölsche claimed that Rebuilding America's Defenses "had been developed by PNAC for Rumsfeld, Cheney, Wolfowitz, and Libby" and was "devoted to matters of 'maintaining US pre-eminence, thwarting rival powers and shaping the global security system according to US interests'". British MP Michael Meacher made similar allegations in 2003, stating that the document was "a blueprint for the creation of a global Pax Americana", which had been "drawn up for" key members of the Bush administration. Academic Peter Dale Scott subsequently wrote

[PNAC's] ideology was summarized in a major position paper, Rebuilding America's Defenses, in 2000. This document advocated a global Pax Americana unrestrained by international law ...

Other academics, such as Donald E. Abelson and Philip Hammond, have suggested that many of these criticisms were overblown, while noting that similar statements about PNAC's origins, goals, and influence "continue to make their way into the academic literature on the neo-conservative network in the United States". Hammond, for example, notes that though Rebuilding America's Defenses "is often cited as evidence that a blueprint for American domination of the world was implemented under cover of the war on terrorism", it was actually "unexceptional". According to Hammond, the report's recommendations were "exactly what one would generally expect neoconservatives to say, and it is no great revelation that they said it in publicly available documents prior to September 2001". Similarly, Abelson has written that "evaluating the extent of PNAC's influence is not as straightforward" as Meacher and others maintain as "we know very little about the inner workings of this think tank and whether it has lived up to its billing as the architect of Bush's foreign policy".

=== Focus on military strategies, versus diplomatic strategies ===
PNAC fellow Reuel Marc Gerecht stated: "We have no choice but to re-instill in our foes and friends the fear that attaches to any great power. ... Only a war against Saddam Hussein will decisively restore the awe that protects American interests abroad and citizens at home".

The Strategic Studies Institute's Jeffrey Record in his monograph Bounding the Global War on Terrorism, Gabriel Kolko, research professor emeritus at York University and author of Another Century of War? (The New Press, 2002), in his article published in CounterPunch, and William Rivers Pitt, in Truthout, respectively, argued that the PNAC's goals of military hegemony exaggerated what the military can accomplish, that they failed to recognize "the limits of US power", and that favoring pre-emptive exercise of military might over diplomatic strategies could have "adverse side effects". (Paul Reynolds and Max Boot made similar observations.)

== End of the organization ==
By the end of 2006, PNAC was "reduced to a voice-mail box and a ghostly website [with a] single employee ... left to wrap things up", according to a correspondent at the BBC News. In 2006 former executive director of the PNAC Gary Schmitt said PNAC had never been intended to "go on forever", and had "already done its job", suggesting that "our view has been adopted". In 2009 Robert Kagan and William Kristol created a new think tank, the Foreign Policy Initiative, which scholars Stephen M. Walt and Don Abelson have characterized as a successor to PNAC. From September 5, 2018, till January 13, 2019, the PNAC homepage went back online without any further explanation.

== People associated with the PNAC ==
=== Project directors ===
These are listed on the PNAC website:

- William Kristol, co-founder and chairman
- Robert Kagan, co-founder
- Bruce P. Jackson
- Mark Gerson
- Randy Scheunemann

=== Project staff ===
- Other director(s):
  - Ellen Bork, Deputy Director
  - Timothy Lehmann, Assistant Director
- Other associates:
  - Senior fellows:
    - Giselle (formerly Thomas) Donnelly, Senior Fellow
    - Reuel Marc Gerecht, Senior Fellow
    - Gary Schmitt, Senior Fellow
- Research associates:
  - Michael Goldfarb, Research Associate
- Comptroller:
  - Dov Zakheim, Under Secretary of Defense (Comptroller) (2001–2004)

=== Former directors and staff ===
- John R. Bolton, Director, former Under Secretary of State for Arms Control and International Security Affairs (2001–2005) and United States Ambassador to the United Nations (2005–06), former National Security Advisor of the United States (2018–19), former senior fellow at the American Enterprise Institute (AEI)
- Daniel McKivergan, Deputy Director
- Christopher Maletz, former Assistant Director
- Richard N. Perle, former Assistant Secretary of Defense for Global Strategic Affairs under the Reagan administration, an AEI associate, and member (and former chairman) of the Defense Policy Board

=== Signatories to Statement of Principles ===
- Elliott Abrams, National Security Advisor (2005–2009)
- Gary Bauer
- William J. Bennett
- John Ellis "Jeb" Bush, Governor of Florida (1999–2007)
- Dick Cheney, Vice President of the United States (2001–2009)
- Eliot A. Cohen, Counselor of State Department (2007–2009)
- Midge Decter
- Paula Dobriansky, Under Secretary of State for Democracy and Global Affairs (2001–2009)
- Steve Forbes
- Aaron Friedberg
- Francis Fukuyama
- Frank Gaffney
- Fred C. Ikle
- Donald Kagan
- Zalmay Khalilzad, Ambassador to Afghanistan (2003–2005), Ambassador to Iraq (2005–2007), Ambassador to United Nations (2007–2009)
- I. Lewis "Scooter" Libby, Chief of Staff to Vice President (2001–2005)
- Norman Podhoretz
- J. Danforth Quayle
- Peter W. Rodman
- Stephen P. Rosen
- Henry S. Rowen
- Donald Rumsfeld, Secretary of Defense (2001–2006)
- Vin Weber
- George Weigel
- Paul Wolfowitz, Deputy Secretary of Defense (2001–2005)

== See also ==
- American Century
- American imperialism
- Liberal internationalism
- Wilsonianism
- Center for a New American Security
- Committee on the Present Danger
- Committee for the Liberation of Iraq
- A Clean Break: A New Strategy for Securing the Realm
- Project 2025
- Growth & Opportunity Project
