= Daniel C. Searle =

American businessman (1926 – 2007)

- Born: May 6, 1926; Evanston, Illinois
- Died: October 30, 2007 (aged 81); Scotland
- Education: Deerfield Academy; Yale University; Harvard Business School
- Occupation(s): Businessman, philanthropist
- Spouse: Dain Searle
- Children: D. Gideon Searle; Michael Searle; Anne Bent Searle
- Parent: John Gideon Searle
- Relatives: Gideon Daniel Searle (paternal great-grandfather)

Daniel C. Searle (May 6, 1926 – October 30, 2007) was an American business executive and philanthropist. He served as the Chief Executive Officer and President of G. D. Searle & Co from 1970 to 1977, and as its Chairman from 1977 until its merger with Monsanto in 1985. (G.D. Searle is now a subsidiary of Pfizer). He established the Searle Freedom Trust to promote free market economics.

== Early life ==
Daniel Searle was born in Evanston, Illinois on May 6, 1926. His paternal great-grandfather was Gideon Daniel Searle, who founded G. D. Searle & Company in 1888. His father was John Gideon Searle, CEO of the family business from 1936 to 1972. He had a sister, Suzanne Dixon and a brother, William L. Searle. He attended boarding school in Arizona and the Deerfield Academy in Massachusetts. He served in the United States Navy Reserve and in 1950 graduated from Yale University, where he played polo. In 1952, he received an MBA from Harvard Business School.

== Business career ==
He was appointed president of G. D. Searle & Co in 1966 and chief executive officer in 1970. In 1977, Searle recruited Donald Rumsfeld, then recently Gerald Ford's Secretary of Defense, as president and chief executive officer, and Searle became chairman of the board of directors. In 1985, G. D. Searle & Co. was sold to Monsanto for US$2.7 billion. The Searle family owned 34% of the company.

Additionally, Searle was an investor in the Milwaukee Braves and the Chicago Bulls.

== Political activity ==
Searle's ideology was "free enterprise conservative", according to a former G. D. Searle board member and long-time friend. In 1962, Searle helped finance Donald Rumsfeld's successful campaign for United States House of Representatives from Illinois's 13th congressional district. Searle was chairman of the finance committee of Rumsfeld's campaign. G. D. Searle named Rumsfeld as its CEO in 1977, and he remained in that position until 1985.

== Philanthropy ==
Searle was a trustee of the Hudson Institute. He also sat on the Board of Trustees of the Art Institute of Chicago. Searle was an early member of the board of directors of Donors Trust, a donor-advised fund.

He joined the Board of Trustees of Northwestern University in 1966 and became Life Trustee in 2000. He served as an Adviser to the Searle Funds at The Chicago Community Trust and donated grants to the Searle Biomedical Awards at the Feinberg School of Medicine, the Searle Leadership Fund in the Life Sciences, the Chicago Biomedical Consortium and the Searle Hall, home of the Northwestern University Health Center. He was a trustee of the John G. Searle Family Trust, which funded the Searle Center for Teaching Excellence and the Searle Center at the Northwestern University School of Law.

=== Searle Freedom Trust ===
Searle set up the Searle Freedom Trust to support free market economics. The trust was worth US$100 million in 2007. The trust will be depleted and closed by 2025 after the model of the John M. Olin Foundation, "to ensure that the Foundation will always remain in the hands of people who understand my [Searle's] intentions and are committed to carrying out the Foundation's mission". Grantees of the Searle Freedom Trust include conservative and libertarian organizations.

Searle's son Gideon succeeded his father as chairman of the Trust. Kimberly O. Dennis is the president and chief executive officer of the Searle Freedom Trust.

In 2024 a CNN analysis found that Searle Freedom Trust had distributed $200 million to conservative non-profits in the previous decade. The Trust is slated to close down in 2025

== Personal life ==
He was married to Dain Searle. They had two sons, D. Gideon Searle and Michael, and a daughter, Anne Bent. They lived in Hobe Sound, Florida and maintained his parents's family home in Winnetka, Illinois. He was a member of the Augusta National Golf Club.

In 1996, heirs to concentration camp victims sued him in connection with a Degas painting that had been seized from their family in World War II. Morley Safer won one of his 12 Emmys for his coverage of the lawsuit against Searle for 60 Minutes. This claim resulted in the first settlement concerning Nazi looted art in America.

== Death and legacy ==
Searle died of emphysema on a pheasant hunting trip in Scotland on October 30, 2007. The Searle Freedom Trust continues to endow free-market organizations.

== See also ==
- American Enterprise Institute
- Reason Foundation
- The Tax Foundation
- The Manhattan Institute
- Cato Institute
- Friedrich Gutmann
- List of claims for restitution for Nazi looted art
