= Reuel Marc Gerecht =

American intelligence officer and writer (born 1949)

Reuel Marc Gerecht (born 1959) is an American writer and political analyst focused on the Middle East. He is a senior fellow at the Foundation for Defense of Democracies, focusing primarily on the Middle East, Islamic militancy, counterterrorism, and intelligence. He is a former director of the Project for the New American Century's Middle East Initiative and a former resident fellow at the American Enterprise Institute. Earlier in his career Gerecht was a case officer at the CIA, primarily working on Middle Eastern targets.

== Life and career ==
Gerecht was a CIA case officer from 1985 until 1994. In the 1990s, while Gerecht was living abroad, he occasionally wrote under the pseudonym of Edward Shirley.

He writes regularly for The Wall Street Journal, The New York Times, and The Washington Post, and many other publications. A contributing editor at The Weekly Standard, Mr Gerecht has been a foreign-affairs columnist for The New Republic magazine's foreign-affairs blog and a foreign correspondent for The Atlantic Monthly.

An expert in counterterrorism and the Middle East, Gerecht was prescient in a July 2001 article for The Atlantic when he criticized the intelligence community for their collective overconfidence towards Al Qaeda and Osama Bin Laden, reporting that U.S. officials claimed they were "picking apart" bin Laden's terrorist network "limb by limb" just a few months before the September 11 terrorist attacks on New York City and Washington D.C.

Gerecht has advocated the re-establishment of diplomatic relationships with Tehran before any military action is taken. According to journalist Andrew Sullivan, Gerecht also defends the use of physically coercive interrogation techniques in the ticking time bomb scenario.

Gerecht has been associated with the neoconservative movement in foreign affairs, which advocates an active and interventionist American foreign policy. He was a strong proponent of military strikes against the Taliban and al-Qa'ida in Afghanistan in the 1990s, a backer of both the Afghan and Iraq wars (authoring, among other pieces, the article "An Iraq War Won't Destabilize the Mideast", written in 2002 as part of pro war opinion-making that would culminate in the 2003 invasion of Iraq), and has repeatedly urged a hawkish approach toward Iran, including preemptive strikes against Iran's nuclear sites and military retaliation for the alleged Iranian assassination plot against the Saudi ambassador in the United States. Gerecht was a harsh critic of the Central Intelligence Agency's performance in the 1990s against the Islamic terrorist target, and has often written about the difficulties of reforming the American intelligence establishment. A disciple and friend of the Princeton historian Bernard Lewis, Gerecht has nevertheless argued that Islamic fundamentalists, not Muslim liberals, will be the engine of political reform and democratization in the Middle East. His views have often been condensed into the remark, "No Thomas Jefferson without Martin Luther".

== Bibliography ==
- Know Thine Enemy: A Spy's Journey into Revolutionary Iran (Farrar, Straus & Giroux, 1997).
- The Islamic Paradox: Shiite Clerics, Sunni Fundamentalists, and the Coming of Arab Democracy (AEI press, 2004)
- The Wave: Man, God, and the Ballot Box in the Middle East (Hoover Institution, Stanford University, 2011)
