= Aaron Sibarium =

American journalist

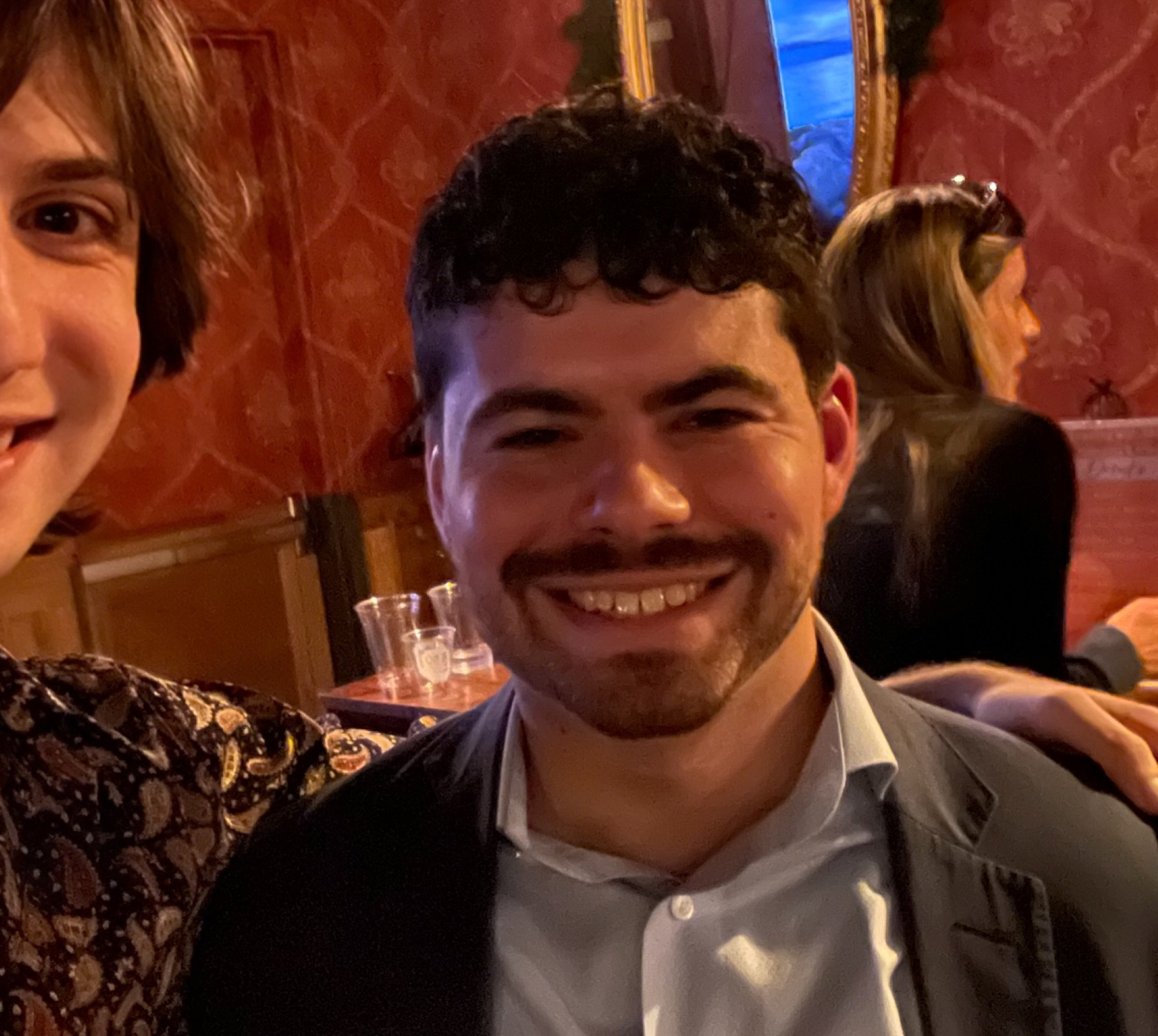
Aaron Sibarium in Washington DC, 2025

Aaron Sibarium is an American journalist. He is a staff writer at the Washington Free Beacon. He is a 2018 graduate of Yale University where he was editor of the opinion section of the Yale Daily News.

Sibarium found many of the instances of plagiarism committed by Harvard president Claudine Gay, which led to her resignation in 2023.

He was called a "rising star reporter" by David French in The New York Times, where Sibarium offered the advice: "Whenever I'm on a career advice panel for young conservatives, I tell them to avoid group chats that use the N-word or otherwise blur the line between edgelording and earnest bigotry."
