= Claudine Gay =

American political scientist and university administrator (born 1970)

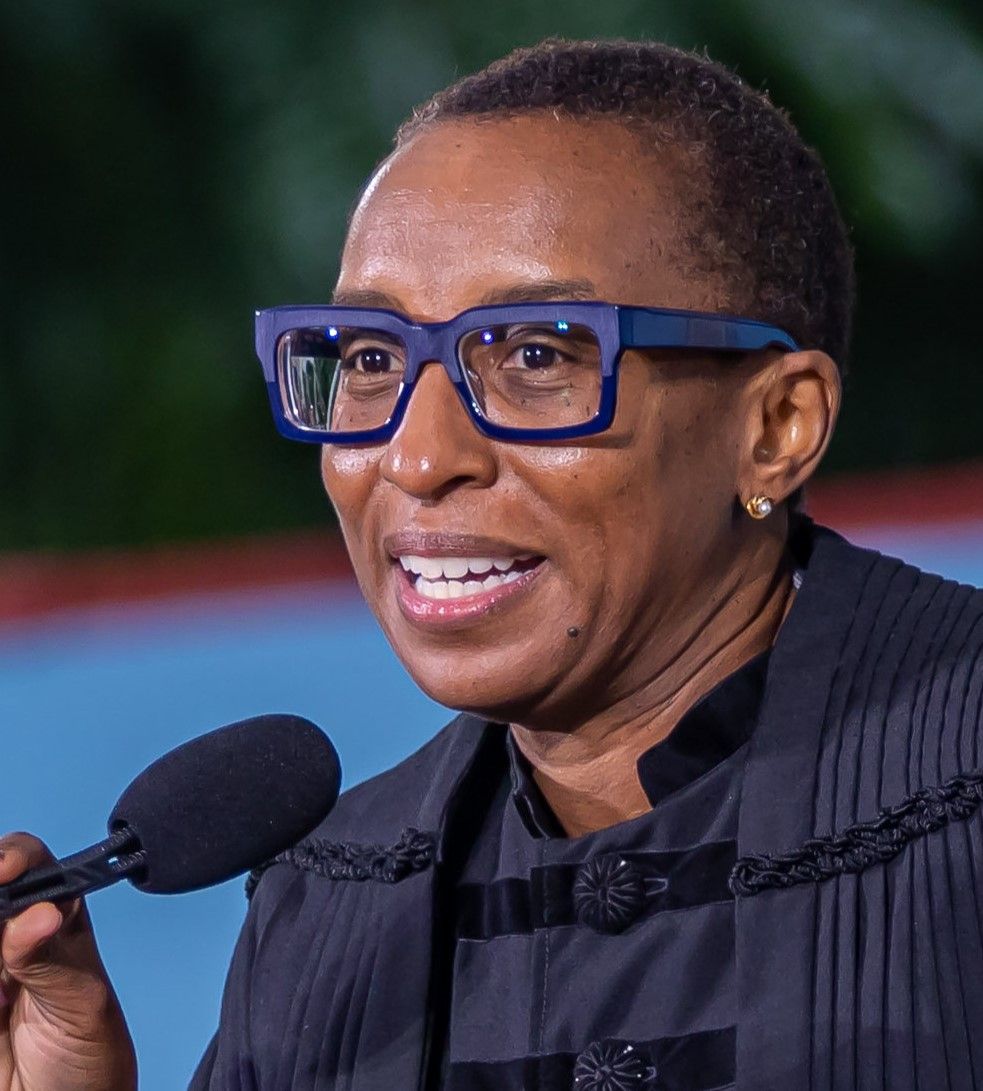
- Gay in 2023

30th President of Harvard University
- In office July 1, 2023 – January 2, 2024
- Preceded by: Lawrence Bacow
- Succeeded by: Alan Garber

Dean of the Harvard Faculty of Arts and Sciences
- In office August 15, 2018 – June 30, 2023
- Preceded by: Michael Smith
- Succeeded by: Emma Dench (interim); Hopi Hoekstra

Personal details
- Born: August 4, 1970 (age 56) New York City, U.S.
- Spouse: Christopher Afendulis
- Children: 1
- Relatives: Roxane Gay (cousin)
- Education: Princeton University; Stanford University (BA); Harvard University (PhD)

Academic background
- Thesis: Taking charge: Black electoral success and the redefinition of American politics (1997)
- Doctoral advisor: Gary King

Academic work
- Discipline: Political science
- Institutions: Stanford University (2000–2006); Harvard University (2006–present)

Claudine Gay (born August 4, 1970) is an American political scientist who is the Wilbur A. Cowett Professor of Government and of African and African-American Studies at Harvard University. Her research focuses on American political behavior, including voter turnout and politics of race and identity.

Gay served as the dean of Social Sciences at Harvard from 2015 to 2018, as the dean of the Harvard Faculty of Arts and Sciences from 2018 to 2023, and as the 30th president of Harvard University from July 2023 to January 2024.

In December 2023, Gay and two other university presidents faced pressure from the public and from a congressional committee to resign, over responses to claims of antisemitic violence on the campus. Amid this pressure campaign Gay was accused of plagiarism in academic publications, although the allegations have been contested. In January 2024, she resigned from the presidency.

== Early life and education ==
Gay was born in The Bronx on August 4, 1970, and grew up initially in New York City, with her older brother, Sony Gay, Jr. Her parents were international students from Haiti, who met in New York City as college students in 1967. Her mother, Claudette Gay, née Bateau (1946–2023), studied nursing and her father studied civil engineering. While still a child, Gay and her family moved to Saudi Arabia, where her father, Sony Gay, Sr., worked for the United States Army Corps of Engineers. The family moved back to the United States and lived in Georgia and Colorado. Feminist writer Roxane Gay is Gay's first cousin. Their family owns and runs Haiti's largest concrete plant, located in Port-au-Prince.

Gay attended Phillips Exeter Academy, a private boarding school in Exeter, New Hampshire, from which she graduated in 1988. She attended Princeton University for one year before transferring to Stanford University where she majored in economics and graduated in 1992, receiving the Anna Laura Myers Prize for outstanding thesis in economics. Gay earned a Ph.D. in 1998 from Harvard University and won the university's Toppan Prize for the best dissertation in political science.

== Academic career ==
After graduating, Gay was an assistant professor, and later tenured associate professor, in Stanford's Department of Political Science from 2000 to 2006. In the 2003–2004 academic year, she was a fellow at the Center for Advanced Study in the Behavioral Sciences at Stanford University.

Gay's research addresses American political behavior, including voter turnout, housing policy, and the politics of race and identity. She was recruited by Harvard to be a professor of government in 2006, and was appointed professor of African-American studies in 2007.

=== Administrative positions ===
In 2015, Gay was named the dean of social sciences at the Harvard Faculty of Arts and Sciences (FAS) and the Wilbur A. Cowett Professor of Government and of African and African-American Studies. In 2018, she was appointed Dean of the Faculty of Arts and Sciences.

As Dean of FAS, which oversees graduate and undergraduate studies, Gay outlined four primary concerns: increasing diversity among faculty, supporting students interested in interdisciplinary studies, encouraging interdepartmental collaboration among professors, and fostering faculty involvement in the university's community.

Gay's priorities during her tenure as dean included anti-racism initiatives and increasing racial diversity on campus among students and faculty. In August 2020, FAS hired its first associate dean of diversity, inclusion, and belonging. Following the June 2023 Supreme Court decision in Students for Fair Admissions v. Harvard, which held that race-based affirmative action programs in college admissions were unconstitutional, Gay said that Harvard would "comply with the court's decision, but it does not change our values."

During her deanship, Gay disciplined multiple Harvard professors for alleged sexual misconduct. She removed emeritus status from retired professors Jorge I. Domínguez and Gary Urton, and placed professors John Comaroff and Roland G. Fryer Jr. on leave, after they each faced accusations of sexual harassment. Gay also sanctioned professor Martin Nowak for "unprofessional behavior" in his contacts with sex offender Jeffrey Epstein.

Harvard Law School professor and Winthrop House faculty dean Ronald Sullivan faced student protests in spring 2019 after joining the legal defense team for Harvey Weinstein, who was on trial for rape. Gay called Sullivan's response to the controversy "insufficient", citing his "special responsibility" as house dean for the well-being of Winthrop residents. Harvard College dean Rakesh Khurana decided not to renew Sullivan's contract as Winthrop dean, a decision criticized by the American Civil Liberties Union.

In 2019, Gay said that Harvard would seek to hire multiple ethnic studies professors, hiring three in 2022. After protests condemning Harvard's denial of tenure to Lorgia García Peña, a scholar of ethnic studies, Gay said in January 2020 that she would initiate a review of the FAS tenure process. The review, released in October 2021, stated that Harvard's tenure process was largely "structurally sound", but also found "a lack of trust in, and a low morale, about the tenure process" among faculty.

As dean, Gay oversaw the 2021 launch of a new billion-dollar Science and Engineering Complex on Harvard's Allston campus, including a PhD program in quantum engineering.

Harvard faced educational and financial disruptions due to the COVID-19 pandemic. For fiscal year 2020, the Faculty of Arts and Sciences reported losses of $15.8 million. In early 2021, Gay announced that the cost of the FAS's core academic commitments were greater than its revenues and began processes to reduce expenses. At the end of that year, the FAS reported a surplus of $51 million, an increase from the projected deficit of $112 million.

In addition to her positions at Harvard, Gay served as a vice president of the Midwest Political Science Association from 2014 to 2017 and as a trustee of Phillips Exeter from 2017 to 2023.

=== Harvard University presidency ===
In June 2022, Harvard University president Lawrence Bacow announced that he would resign from the post in one year. A search committee led by Penny Pritzker considered 600 nominees and selected Gay to succeed Bacow. On December 15, 2022, Harvard announced that Gay had been selected as the 30th president of Harvard University. She took office on July 1, 2023, becoming the university's first Black president.

==== Congressional hearing on antisemitism ====
After the October 7, 2023 Hamas-led attack on Israel, Gay faced criticism, including from former Harvard president Lawrence Summers, who accused her of not adequately condemning the attacks. In a December 2023 Congressional committee hearing, Gay and the presidents of MIT and the University of Pennsylvania were asked about institutional response to antisemitism on their campuses. When asked, by Elise Stefanik, if a hypothetical call for the genocide of Jewish people would qualify as a violation of Harvard's code of conduct, Gay responded: "It can be, depending on the context." She later clarified: "Antisemitic rhetoric, when it crosses into conduct that amounts to bullying, harassment, intimidation — that is actionable conduct and we do take action."

Gay's remarks were broadly criticized in the media. In response, Gay apologized and said that some people "have confused a right to free expression with the idea that Harvard will condone calls for violence against Jewish students". A letter signed by 70 congressional representatives called for all three presidents to resign. Liz Magill had already been under pressure within the University of Pennsylvania, and resigned from the presidency the following week.

On December 11, more than 700 of Harvard's 2,452 faculty members signed a letter opposing calls for Gay to be removed as university president. The executive committee of Harvard's Alumni Association stated it "unanimously and unequivocally" supported Gay's leadership, praising her "for protecting academic freedom and the right of all students to voice their opinions". On December 12, the board of the Harvard Corporation said they "unanimously" supported Gay's leadership, adding: "President Gay has apologized for how she handled her congressional testimony and has committed to redoubling the University's fight against antisemitism."

==== Plagiarism investigations ====
Soon after the December congressional hearing, Gay was accused of plagiarism by conservative activist Christopher Rufo and journalist Aaron Sibarium, and by an anonymous complaint. As summarized by The New York Times, the allegations concerned "using material from other sources without proper attribution... [ranging] from brief snippets of technical definitions to paragraphs summing up other scholars' research that are only lightly paraphrased, and in some cases lack any direct citation of the other scholars." The allegations totaled almost 50 instances spanning eight of Gay's academic works, including her dissertation and five of her 11 published articles.

Carol M. Swain accused Gay of a failure to credit Swain's work from her 1993 book, Black Faces, Black Interests: The Representation of African Americans in Congress, as well as Swain's article "Women and Blacks in Congress: 1870–1996" that was published in 1997.

Harvard had been contacted by the New York Post in October 2023 for comment on a planned story about 27 "possible examples of plagiarism", and called the Post's allegations "demonstrably false", threatening to sue the newspaper for libel.

In response, Gay said she stood behind the integrity of her work and requested an outside review of it. The Harvard Corporation reported that the review found "a few instances of inadequate citation" and "duplicative language without appropriate attribution" in her work, but "no violation of Harvard's standards for research misconduct." Analyses by The Harvard Crimson and CNN contested Harvard's statement, finding that Gay had likely violated the university's policies on plagiarism and academic integrity. Gay requested seven corrections to add citations and quotation marks to her dissertation and two of her articles. Academic Joseph Reagle opined that media reports that Gay "plagiarized" implied that she had stolen the central ideas in her work, saying "I don't think this is the case" but that the work "contain plagiarized prose. This is a lesser but still significant infraction." Academic William Arighi, writing for the Journal of Academic Freedom, later characterized the events as "an attempt not at promoting truth but at grinding a political ax".

In response to the allegations, the congressional committee that held the hearing on antisemitism said it would examine Gay's work, and asked the university to produce related communications and documentation.

==== Resignation ====
On January 2, 2024, Gay announced she was resigning her position. In an email to affiliates, Gay wrote, "it has been distressing to have doubt cast on my commitments to confronting hate and to upholding scholarly rigor – two bedrock values that are fundamental to who I am—and frightening to be subjected to personal attacks and threats fueled by racial animus." In an op-ed the following day, Gay wrote that she "made mistakes", but her invitation to testify before Congress about antisemitism was a "well-laid trap", and the campaign to oust her was "[a] skirmish in a broader war to unravel public faith in pillars of American society".

Following Gay's resignation, Alan Garber, the provost of Harvard, was named interim president. Gay remains on the faculty at Harvard.

== Personal life ==
Gay is married to Christopher Afendulis, an information systems analyst at Stanford's Department of Health Research and Policy. They have a son. Her son was born in 2006, in her last year of employment at Stanford.

== Selected publications ==
- 1998: "Doubly Bound: The Impact of Gender and Race on the Politics of Black Women", Political Psychology, co-authored with Katherine Tate
- 2001: "The Effect of Black Congressional Representation on Political Participation", American Political Science Review
- 2001: The Effect of Minority Districts and Minority Representation on Political Participation in California, Public Policy Institute of California
- 2002: "Spirals of Trust? The Effect of Descriptive Representation on the Relationship Between Citizens and Their Government", American Journal of Political Science
- 2004: "Putting Race in Context: Identifying the Environmental Determinants of Black Racial Attitudes", American Political Science Review
- 2006: "Seeing Difference: The Effect of Economic Disparity on Black Attitudes Toward Latinos", American Journal of Political Science
- 2007: "Legislating Without Constraints: The Effect of Minority Districting on Legislators' Responsiveness to Constituency Preferences", The Journal of Politics
- 2012: "Moving to Opportunity: The Political Effects of a Housing Mobility Experiment", Urban Affairs Review
- 2013: Outsiders No More? Models of Immigrant Political Incorporation, Oxford University Press, co-editor with Jacqueline Chattopadhyay, Jennifer Hochschild, and Michael Jones-Correa
- 2014: "Knowledge Matters: Policy Cross-pressures and Black Partisanship", Political Behavior
