= Giselle Donnelly =

American journalist

- Born: Thomas Donnelly; June 13, 1953 (age 73)
- Known for: Public policy research

Giselle Donnelly (born Thomas Donnelly; June 13, 1953) is a research fellow at the American Enterprise Institute for Public Policy Research (AEI). Donnelly is a writer and analyst specialising in military affairs, and defense, national security and foreign policy and the author of AEI's National Security Outlook. She has been a director at the Lockheed Martin Corporation on strategic communications and initiatives since 2002. She was deputy executive director of the Project for the New American Century (PNAC) from 1999 to 2002.

Since 2012, she has served as a resident fellow and co-director with Gary Schmitt of the American Enterprise Institute's Marilyn Ware Center for Security Studies.

== Education ==
Donnelly was educated at Sidwell Friends School. She received her M.I.P.P. from the School of Advanced International Studies at Johns Hopkins University and a B.A. from Ithaca College.

== Career ==
She began her career as a journalist at her family's Journal newspapers in the Washington, D.C. area in 1978. Two years later she began working at Army Times. In 1985, she helped to launch Defense News and became its Deputy Editor (1984–1987). She returned to Army Times and served as editor from 1987 to 1993. During her tenure she redesigned the paper and oversaw writing on Operation Just Cause in Panama, the First Gulf War, and the mission to Somalia. She became executive editor of The National Interest on 1994 and remained for one year.

In 1995, she moved on to become a professional staff member at the U.S. House of Representatives Committee on National Security (now the Committee on Armed Services). She was appointed director of the Policy Group of the Committee, a post which she held from 1996 to 1999. She was the principal author of Rebuilding America's Defenses: Strategy, Forces and Resources for a New Century published by PNAC in September 2000.

Donnelly had begun transitioning before publicly living as a trans woman in October 2018, taking the name Giselle.

== Bibliography ==
- Lessons for a Long War: How America Can Win on New Battlefields (AEI, 2010) Frederick W. Kagan
- Ground Truth: The Future of U.S. Land Power (AEI, 2008), coauthored with Frederick W. Kagan
- Of Men and Materiel: The Crisis in Military Resources (AEI, 2007), co-edited with Gary J. Schmitt
- The Military We Need (AEI, 2005);
- Operation Iraqi Freedom: A Strategic Assessment (2004)
- Clash of Chariots: A History of Armored Warfare, Berkeley Books, 1996
- Operation Just Cause: The Storming of Panama, Lexington Books, 1991
