= James Reynolds (journalist) =

British journalist (born 1974)

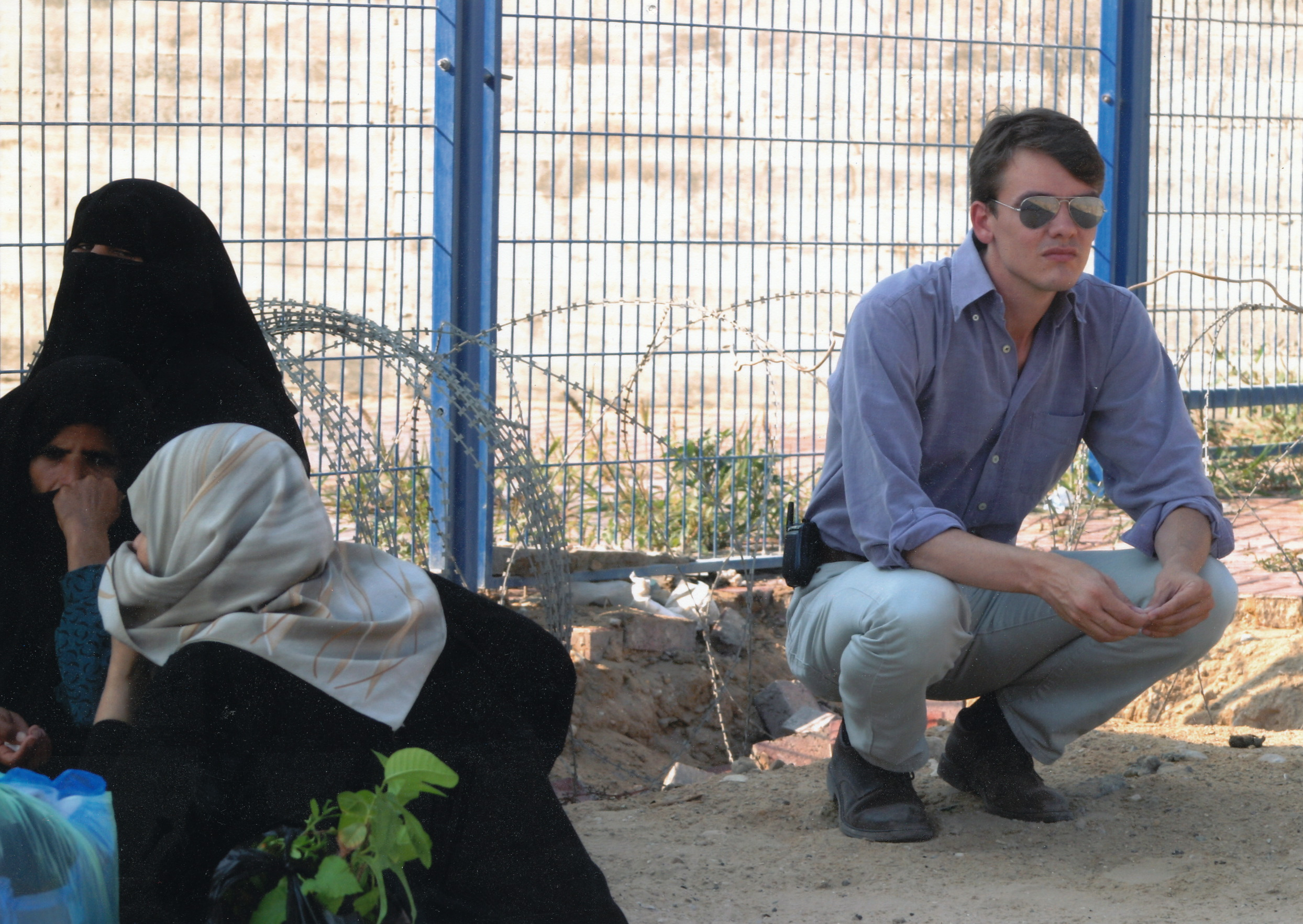
- Reynolds reporting from the Gaza Strip, 2005
- Born: James Edward Reynolds; 20 May 1974 (age 52); Kingston upon Thames, London, England
- Education: Christ's College, Cambridge
- Occupations: Journalist, news presenter
- Years active: 1996–present
- Employer: BBC
- Notable work: BBC News
- Father: Paul Reynolds

James Edward Reynolds (born 20 May 1974) is a British journalist who is currently a presenter for BBC News and BBC World News.

== Early life ==
Reynolds was born in Kingston upon Thames, and is the son of the former BBC foreign correspondent Paul Reynolds. He was brought up in New York City, Brussels and Jerusalem, and educated at Westminster School and Christ's College, Cambridge.

== Career ==
In 1997, Reynolds joined the BBC as a trainee with the regional news programme East Midlands Today in Nottingham. In the following year he was posted to Santiago, Chile, to work as the BBC's South America correspondent. In 2001, he was transferred to Jerusalem to work as a BBC Middle East correspondent. From 2006 to 2009, he was the BBC's China correspondent, based in Beijing. Reynolds spent 2009/10 as a fellow at the Nieman Foundation for Journalism at Harvard University. In 2010, he returned to the BBC as the Iranian Affairs correspondent. In 2012, he was posted to Turkey as the BBC's Istanbul correspondent. In September 2014, Reynolds took up a posting as Rome correspondent. In 2019 he returned to London to become a presenter, working first on overnight bulletins. He is now a regular relief presenter on BBC World News and the BBC News Channel.
