= The Washington Free Beacon =

American neoconservative political journalism website

- Type: Online news site
- Format: Website
- Editor-in-chief: Eliana Johnson
- Managing editor: Sonny Bunch, Victorino Matus, Stephanie Wang
- Founded: 2012; 14 years ago
- Political alignment: Conservative
- Language: English
- Headquarters: Washington, D.C.
- Website: freebeacon.com

The Washington Free Beacon is an American conservative political journalism website launched in 2012. Eliana Johnson is the website's editor-in-chief.

The Free Beacon has broken stories about states using racial preferences in rationing COVID-19 drugs, exposed Columbia Law School's plans to evade the banning of consideration of race in admissions, and uncovered Yale University administrators' bullying of a student, which led to personnel changes at the school. The Free Beacon also reported on plagiarism accusations against Harvard President Claudine Gay, who resigned shortly thereafter. The Washington Post called Gay's resignation "a major win" for the Free Beacon, which it called "the rare conservative media outlet that does significant reporting of its own." The website's reporting on a number of senior administrators at Columbia University exchanging text messages it considers antisemitic led three deans to resign.

== Overview ==
The Free Beacon was founded by Michael Goldfarb, Aaron Harison, and Matthew Continetti. It launched on February 7, 2012, as a project of the Center for American Freedom, a conservative advocacy group modeled on the liberal Center for American Progress. The website is financially backed by Paul Singer, an American billionaire hedge fund manager and Republican donor.

The site is known for its conservative reporting, with the intention to publicize stories and influence the coverage of the mainstream media, and is modeled after liberal counterparts in the media such as ThinkProgress and Talking Points Memo. The site has roots in the Republican Party's neoconservative wing.

In 2019, Politico journalist Eliana Johnson assumed the editor-in-chief position from the WFB's founding editor Matthew Continetti. At the time, the outlet had 24 staffers.

== Reporting ==
Jack Hunter, a staff member of Senator Rand Paul's office, resigned in 2013 after a Free Beacon report detailed his past as a pro-secessionist radio shock jock known as the "Southern Avenger".

The publication also broke several stories about Hillary Clinton's successful 1975 legal defense of an accused child rapist that attracted national media attention.

From October 2015 to May 2016, The Free Beacon hired Fusion GPS to conduct opposition research on "multiple candidates" during the 2016 presidential election, including Donald Trump. The Free Beacon stopped funding this research when Trump clinched the Republican nomination. Fusion GPS later hired former British intelligence officer Christopher Steele and produced the Steele dossier that alleged links between the Trump campaign and the Kremlin. Paul Singer, a major donor to the Free Beacon, said he was unaware of this dossier until BuzzFeed News published it in January 2017. On October 27, 2017, the Free Beacon publicly disclosed that it had hired Fusion GPS, and said that it "had no knowledge of or connection to the Steele dossier, did not pay for the dossier, and never had contact with, knowledge of, or provided payment for any work performed by Christopher Steele".

The Free Beacon came under criticism for its reporting on Fusion GPS. Three days before it was revealed that the Free Beacon had funded the work by Fusion GPS, the Free Beacon wrote that the firm's work "was funded by an unknown GOP client while the primary was still going on." The Free Beacon has published pieces portraying Fusion GPS's work as unreliable "without noting that it considered Fusion GPS reliable enough to pay for its services". In an editor's note, Continetti wrote, "the reason for this omission is that the authors of these articles, and the particular editors who reviewed them, were unaware of this relationship", and that the outlet was reviewing its editorial process to avoid similar issues in the future.

In 2022, a Free Beacon article by Patrick Hauf accused President Joe Biden's administration of planning to use federal dollars to fund safe smoking kits that included crack pipes as part of a harm reduction initiative; this prompted outrage among Republicans in Congress, some of whom proposed a bill to ban the federal government from funding drug paraphernalia. The Washington Post later reported that, according to a United States Department of Health and Human Services spokesperson, "Hauf jumped to a conclusion that was not warranted" because, while the safe smoking kits were meant to reduce risk in smoking "any illicit substance", the agency funding the program "d[id] not specify the kits' elements, only the parameters"; thus, although such smoking kits often include crack pipes and (according to a Drug Policy Alliance spokesman interviewed for the Washington Post article) some of the groups planning to apply for the funding had assumed that its kits would also include them, it was not clear that the agency had intended to include them.

Bill Gertz, a senior editor until October 2019, took $100,000 from Guo Wengui, a conspiracy theorist, without disclosure, wrote stories citing him, and introduced him to Steve Bannon. Gertz was subsequently fired, with a disclaimer appended to his affected stories.

In 2023 and 2024, The New York Times credited the Free Beacon with breaking, together with Chris Rufo, and subsequently expanding on, the plagiarism accusations against Harvard President Claudine Gay, who resigned shortly thereafter. The Washington Post called Gay's resignation "a major win" for the Free Beacon, which it called "the rare conservative media outlet that does significant reporting of its own".

In May 2024, the Free Beacon reported that the David Geffen School of Medicine at UCLA had continued to evaluate applicants based on race rather than qualifications despite the illegality of race-based affirmative action in California since 1996. According to the outlet's reporting, 50% of UCLA medical students now fail basic tests of medical competence. A former admissions staff member called UCLA a "failed medical school".

On July 3, 2024, the Free Beacon reported that a number of senior administrators at Columbia University had exchanged text messages demeaning members of a panel on Jewish life on campus after the 2024 Columbia University pro-Palestinian campus occupations. In August 2024, three deans resigned in the wake of that reporting.

== Reception ==
Jim Rutenberg of The New York Times described the reporting style of the Free Beacon as "gleeful evisceration". The Atlantic's Conor Friedersdorf called the Free Beacon's mission "decadent and unethical."

Ben Howe wrote in The Daily Beast that The Washington Free Beacon established "itself as a credible source of conservative journalism with deep investigative dives and exposes on money in politics", but after Trump's election it was "producing less actual reporting" and moved "more towards the path of least resistance: spending their time criticizing the left and the media, along with healthy doses of opinion writing". McKay Coppins in the Columbia Journalism Review wrote in September 2018 that while the website contains "a fair amount of trolling… it has also earned a reputation for real-deal journalism… If a partisan press really is the future, we could do worse than the Free Beacon".

Jeet Heer wrote in The New Republic: "Much of the conservative press is terrible but the Free Beacon is far superior to propagandist fare like The Daily Caller. Unlike other comparable conservative websites, the Free Beacon makes an effort to do original reporting. Its commitment to journalism should be welcomed by liberals". In 2015, Mother Jones wrote that the Free Beacon was far better than contemporary conservative outlets such as The Daily Caller but that "the Beacon hasn't always steered clear of stories that please the base but don't really stand up", and that it tends towards inflammatory pieces that "push conservatives' buttons". That same year, the Washingtonian wrote that "The Beacon's emphasis on newsgathering sets it apart among right-facing publications".

Ben Smith wrote in BuzzFeed News that the Free Beacon was "[a]lternately parodic and wire-service serious", and had "broken major political news, mostly negative" (although its focus was mainly directed against Democrats). Smith continued that the Free Beacon's hard news reporting differentiated it from other conservative outlets which were either opinion focused or did not produce journalism which met mainstream standards.

Politico Magazine reported that it is "somewhat grudgingly respected in liberal circles."

== See also ==
- Aaron Sibarium
- Alternative media (U.S. political right)
