= Michael Goldfarb (political writer) =

American conservative political writer (born 1980)

Michael L. Goldfarb (born June 6, 1980) is an American conservative political writer. He was contributing editor for The Weekly Standard and was a research associate at the Project for the New American Century. During the 2008 presidential race he served as John McCain's deputy communications director. He is a founder of the online conservative magazine The Washington Free Beacon. Goldfarb attracted some online attention for two posts ridiculing liberal bloggers as basement-dwelling Dungeons & Dragons players.

Goldfarb graduated with an A.B. in history from Princeton University in 2002 after completing a 98-page-long senior thesis, titled "The Search for Stability in Afghanistan: The Lessons of State Building in Afghan History," under the supervision of Stephen Kotkin.

In an article titled "A Conservative Provocateur, Using a Blowtorch as His Pen," The New York Times called Goldfarb "an all-around anti-liberal provocateur" and said he "has blazed a trail in the new era of campaign finance, in which loosened restrictions have flooded the political world with cash for a whole new array of organizations that operate outside the traditional bounds of the parties."

== Accusation of antisemitism against Obama ==
As a blogger and deputy communications director for the McCain presidential campaign, Goldfarb told CNN, "The point is that Barack Obama has a long track record of being around anti-Semitic, anti-Israel, and anti-American rhetoric."

Asked to be specific, Goldfarb named Rashid Khalidi, a Columbia University professor who once held a fundraiser for Obama, but then refused to cite anyone else. Blogger Andrew Sullivan wrote on The Daily Dish, "Asked to name one other anti-Semite other than his allegation about Rashid Khalidi, he can't. He won't. But he leaves it hanging, refusing to disown or retract the charge. This is pure McCarthyism. And it is the rotten core of McCain." Goldfarb later explained that the McCain campaign had decided not to make mention of Obama's relationship with Jeremiah Wright, who has a long history of such rhetoric.

== Beauchamp affair ==
While at The Weekly Standard, Goldfarb was the first to raise doubts about the veracity of Scott Beauchamp's then-anonymous Iraq reporting for The New Republic.

== Affiliations ==
- Orion Strategies LLC – Senior Vice President
- Emergency Committee for Israel – Advisor
- Keep America Safe – Advisor
