= 2000 United States federal budget =

2000 Budget of the United States federal government
- Submitted: February 1, 1999
- Submitted by: Bill Clinton
- Submitted to: 106th Congress
- Country: United States
- Total revenue: $1.88 trillion (requested) $2.03 trillion (actual); 20.0% of GDP (actual)
- Total expenditures: $1.766 trillion (requested) $1.789 trillion (actual); 17.6% of GDP (actual)
- Surplus: $236.2 billion (actual); 2.3% of GDP (actual)
- Debt: $5.629 trillion (at fiscal end); 55.5% of GDP
- GDP: $10.148 trillion
- Website: Office of Management and Budget

The United States Federal Budget for Fiscal Year 2000, was a spending request by President Bill Clinton to fund government operations for October 1999-September 2000. Figures shown in the spending request do not reflect the actual appropriations for Fiscal Year 2000, which must be authorized by Congress.

== Total Receipts ==
2000 Actual Receipts by Source
1. Individual income tax (49.6%)
2. Social Security/other payroll tax (32.2%)
3. Corporate income tax (10.2%)
4. Excise tax (3.40%)
5. Estate and gift taxes (1.40%)
6. Customs duties (1.00%)
7. Other miscellaneous receipts (2.10%)

(in billions of dollars)

Source	Requested	Actual
Individual income tax	900	1,004
Corporate income tax	189	207
Social Security and other payroll tax	637	653
Excise tax	70	69
Estate and gift taxes	27	29
Customs duties	18	20
Other miscellaneous receipts	42	43
Total	1,883	2,025

== Total Outlays ==
Outlays by budget function (in millions)

Function	Title	Actual
050	National Defense	$294,363
150	International Affairs	$17,213
250	General Science, Space and Technology	$18,594
270	Energy	$−761
300	Natural Resources and Environment	$25,003
350	Agriculture	$36,458
370	Commerce and Housing Credit	$3,207
400	Transportation	$46,853
450	Community and Regional Development	$10,623
500	Education, Training, Employment and Social Services	$53,764
550	Health	$154,504
570	Medicare	$197,113
600	Income Security	$253,724
650	Social Security	$409,423
700	Veterans Benefits and Services	$46,989
750	Administration of Justice	$28,499
800	General Government	$13,013
900	Net Interest	$222,949
920	Allowances	$-
950	Undistributed Offsetting Receipts	$−42,581
	Total	$1,788,950
