= Paul Reynolds (BBC journalist) =

Christopher Paul Michel Reynolds (born 23 February 1946) is a former BBC foreign correspondent.

He was educated at Ardingly College and Worcester College, Oxford. He joined the BBC in Norwich in 1968, moving to BBC Radio News in London in 1970, at first as a sub-editor in the Radio Newsroom and subsequently as a reporter. From 1978 to 1987, he was BBC correspondent in New York, Brussels, and Jerusalem. From 1987 to 1995 he was BBC Radio's Diplomatic and Royal Correspondent, continuing as Royal Correspondent until 1998. From 1998 to 2001, he was a BBC Washington Correspondent. He worked as World Affairs Correspondent for BBC News Online from 2002 to 2011, when he retired from the BBC. His son is the BBC News correspondent and presenter, James Reynolds.
