= Irwin Stelzer =

American economist and columnist (born 1932)

- Born: May 22, 1932 (age 94)

Academic background
- Education: New York University

Academic work
- Discipline: Economics
- Institutions: The Sunday Times

Irwin M. Stelzer (born 22 May 1932) is an American economist who is the U.S. economic and business columnist for The Sunday Times in the United Kingdom and was for The Courier-Mail in Australia. In the United States, he was a contributing editor at The Weekly Standard, and for the American Interest and was a columnist for the New York Post. He is a Senior Fellow at the Hudson Institute. Stelzer is a consultant on market strategy, pricing and antitrust issues, and regulatory matters for U.S. and United Kingdom industries. He is also an occasional contributor to The Guardian, the Daily Telegraph, Standpoint, The Critic and the New Statesman. He resides in the United States. Some British politicians and newspapers have vilified Stelzer as Rupert Murdoch's right-hand man, an assertion that Stelzer denies.

== Academic career ==
Stelzer received both his BA degree and his MA degree from New York University. At Cornell University he earned a Ph.D. in economics. He has had teaching appointments at Cornell University, the University of Connecticut, and New York University and he has also been a teaching member of Columbia University’s Continuing Legal Education Programs. He has been elected a Visiting Fellow at Nuffield College, Oxford. He is a former member of the Litigation and Administrative Practice Faculty of the Practising Law Institute. He served on the Massachusetts Institute of Technology Visiting Committee for the Department of Economics.

== Professional career ==
Stelzer co-founded National Economic Research Associates, Inc. (NERA) and served as its president from 1961 to 1983. NERA was sold to Marsh & McLennan Companies, Inc. (MMC) in 1983 and later became NERA Economic Consulting. Stelzer has served as a managing director of the investment banking firm of Rothschild Asset Management Inc. (U.S.) part of N M Rothschild & Sons. He also has served as a director of the Energy and Environmental Policy Center at Harvard University. He is a signatory of the Henry Jackson Society, a senior director and fellow of the Hudson Institute and has edited and introduced a book on neoconservatism. He is a visiting fellow of Nuffield College, Oxford. Prior to joining the Hudson Institute in 1998, Dr. Stelzer was resident scholar and director of regulatory policy studies at the American Enterprise Institute. He started out by delivering flowers for "25 cents a shot"

=== Former Memberships and affiliations ===
- Visiting Committee, The Harris School of Public Policy Studies, The University of Chicago
- Member, Publication Committee, The Public Interest
- Member, Board, Regulatory Policy Institute (Oxford)
- Member, Advisory Board of The American Antitrust Institute
- Advisor to the U.S. Trade Representative
- Cosmos Club, Metropolitan Club, Reform Club

=== Publications ===
Stelzer has written and lectured on economic and policy development in the United States and the United Kingdom. He has written extensively on policy issues such as America's competitive position in the world economy, optimum regulatory policies, the consequences of European integration, and factors affecting and impeding economic growth. He has served as economics editor of the Antitrust Bulletin

- Kitt, Howard P.; Stelzer, Irwin. Selected Antitrust Cases, Landmark Decisions. Richard D. Irwin, Inc. ASIN B0012AQNIA.
- Competitive rates and practices by electric utilities: An economic analysis. National Economic Research Associates. 1968. ASIN B0007DPXHU.
- Impact of competition on regulation: Utility rate-making. National Economic Research Associates. 1968. ASIN B0007GMIQG.
- Kitt, Howard P.; Stelzer, Irwin (1974). Selected Antitrust Cases: Landmark Decisions. Richard D Irwin. ASIN B001H9T040.
- The electric utilities face the next 20 years. National Economic Research Associates. 1978. ASIN B00070RMZY.
- "Energy Policy: Capitalism Anyone?". IIER. 1980. ASIN B005JP7P5Y.
- Benefits and costs of insurance deregulation. National Economic Research Associates. 1981. ASIN B00071UD9K.
- Will cable save the arts?. National Economic Research Associates. 1981. ASIN B00072KDFI.
- Electric utilities in the near-term future: A hard look. National Economic Research Associates. 1984. ASIN B000718Y46.
- Stelzer, Irwin, ed. (1985). Selected Antitrust Cases: Landmark Decisions. Richard D Irwin. ISBN 978-0256032222.
- Cento G. Veljanovski; M.E. Beesley; S.C. Littlechild; Irwin Stelzer; Sir Alan Peacock; et al. (30 September 1991). Regulators and the Market: An Assessment of Growth of Regulation in the UK. Institute of Economic Affairs. ISBN 978-0255362498.
- Stranded investment: Who pays the bill?. American Enterprise Institute for Public Policy Research. 1994. ASIN B0006PBEDG.
- The Department of Energy: An Agency That Cannot Be Reinvented. Aei Press. 1995. ISBN 978-0844770543.
- Stelzer, Irwin; Portney, Paul R. (1998). Making Environmental Policy: Two Views. Aei Press. ISBN 978-0844771168.
- Shenefield, John H.; Stelzer, Irwin (2001). The Antitrust Laws: A Primer. Aei Press. ISBN 978-0844741543.
- Lectures on Regulatory & Competition Policy. Inst of Economic Affairs. 2001. ISBN 978-0255365116.
- The United States, a United Europe and the United Kingdom: Three Characters in Search of a Policy. Hudson Institute. 2001. ASIN B000PSL8GC.
- From Grave to Cradle: Building a Meritocracy. The Social Market Foundation. 2002. ISBN 978-1874097785.
- "Innovation in the Medical Technology Industries". Hudson Institute. 2002. Archived from the original on 2013-04-03.
- Stelzer, Irwin, ed. (2004). The Neocon Reader. Grove Press. ISBN 978-0802141934.
- Stelzer, Irwin, ed. (2005). Neocon Reader. San Val. ISBN 978-1417723164.
- "Energy Policy: Abandon Hope All Ye Who Enter Here" (PDF). White Paper. Hudson Institute. Summer 2008. Archived from the original (PDF) on 8 November 2011.
- "The New Capitalism" (PDF). Hudson Institute. 29 October 2008. Archived from the original (PDF) on 16 September 2012.
- Stelzer, Irwin (8 January 2009). "Energy Independence" (PDF). Presidential Transition Papers. Hudson Institute. Archived from the original (PDF) on 16 June 2012.
- Stelzer, Irwin (8 January 2009). "Financial Regulatory Policy" (PDF). Presidential Transition Papers. Hudson Institute. Archived from the original (PDF) on 28 July 2012.
- Selected Antitrust Cases: Landmark Decisions In Federal Antitrust. Literary Licensing, LLC. 2012. ISBN 978-1258282493.
- "Articles". Personal website. Stelzer Associates. 18 July 2011.
- "Speeches". Personal website. Stelzer Associates. 13 July 2008.
- "Publications". About Hudson – Irwin M. Stelzer. Hudson Institute. Archived from the original on 20 August 2012.
- "Articles". The Weekly Standard. The Weekly Standard LLC.
- Carbon Taxes: An opportunity for Conservatives, Washington: Hudson Institute, 2011.
- “Antitrust and the Hospitals”, National Affairs, Number 5, Fall 2015
- Stelzer, Irwin. The Murdoch Method: Notes on Running a Media Empire. Atlantic Books, 2018
- Later publications, sorted by topic, are available on the web site, www.irwinstelzer.com
