= Katherine Tate =

American political scientist

- Born: November 8, 1962 (age 63)

Academic background
- Education: University of Chicago; University of Michigan

Academic work
- Institutions: Harvard University; University of California, Irvine; Brown University

Katherine Tate (born November 8, 1962) is an American political scientist best known for her research on race and ethnic minority politics. She is a professor of Political Science at Brown University.

== Biography ==
Tate received her B.A. in political science from the University of Chicago in 1983, and her M.A. in 1985 from the University of Michigan. She completed her Ph.D. in political science from Michigan in 1989. After working at Harvard University and serving as an associate professor of political science at Ohio State University she became a professor of Political Science at the University of California, Irvine.

== Selected works ==
- Tate, Katherine (1993), From Protest to Politics: The New Black Voters in American Elections, Cambridge, MA: Harvard University Press and the Russell Sage Foundation. Enlarged edition, 1994. This book was the winner of two book prizes, the Southern Political Science Association's 1994 V.O. Key Jr. book award and the National Conference of Black Political Scientists’ 1995 Outstanding Book Award.
- Barker, Lucius J.; Jones, Mack H.; Tate, Katherine (1999), African Americans and the American Political System (4th ed.), Englewood Cliffs, NJ: Prentice Hall.
- Tate, Katherine (2003), Black Faces in the Mirror: African Americans and Their Representatives in the U.S. Congress, Princeton, NJ: Princeton University Press. This book won the 2004 V.O. Key Jr. book award, and was the co-winner of the 2004 Race, Ethnicity, and Politics Section book award and the 2005 co-winner of the National Conference of Black Political Scientists’ Outstanding Book Award. It was also named an outstanding academic title by Choice Magazine.
- Tate, Katherine (2010), What's Going On? Political Incorporation and the Transformation of Black Public Opinion, Washington, DC: Georgetown University Press, ISBN 9781589017023.
- Tate, Katherine; Taylor, James Lance; Sawyer, Mark Q (2013), Something's In the Air: Race, Crime, and the Legalization of Marijuana, New York, NY: Routledge, ISBN 978-0-415-84240-2.
- Tate, Katherine. (2013). Concordance: Black Lawmaking in the U.S. Congress from Carter to Obama. Ann Arbor, MI: University of Michigan Press. ISBN 978-0-472-11905-9.
