= G. D. Searle & Company =

Trademark and subsidiary of Pfizer Inc

- Type: Subsidiary of Pfizer
- Traded as: NYSE: GDS (no longer trading)
- Industry: Pharmaceutical
- Founded: 1888; 138 years ago (as G. D. Searle & Company)
- Founder: Gideon Daniel Searle
- Headquarters: New York City, United States
- Products: Pharmaceutical products
- Parent: Monsanto
- Website: searlecompany.com

G. D. Searle & Company (often referred to as Searle) was an American pharmaceutical company, now owned by Pfizer. Searle is most notable for having developed the first female birth control pill, the artificial sweetener NutraSweet, and the first anabolic-androgenic steroid. Searle also developed the drug Lomotil, an antidiarrheal medication. One notable alumnus of Searle was Donald Rumsfeld, the Secretary of Defense for George W. Bush in the 2000s. Prior to its 1985 merger with Monsanto, Searle was a company mainly focusing on life sciences, specifically pharmaceuticals, agriculture, and animal health.

== History ==
In 1888 (138 years ago), Gideon Daniel Searle founded Searle in Omaha, Nebraska. The company incorporated in 1908 and established headquarters in Skokie, Illinois in 1941.

In 1953, Searle developed the first anabolic-androgenic steroid Norethandrolone and put it on the market as Nilevar in 1956.

In 1960, Searle released Enovid (Mestranol/noretynodrel) for use as a contraceptive.

Daniel C. Searle served as the chief executive officer and president of G. D. Searle & Co from 1970 to 1977 and initially led efforts to gain FDA approval of the artificial sweetener aspartame.

Between 1977 and 1985, Donald Rumsfeld was CEO, and then president, of Searle. In 1985, he negotiated the acquisition of Searle by Monsanto Corporation.

In 1993, a team of researchers at Searle Research and Development filed a patent application for celecoxib, which Searle developed and which became the first selective COX-2 inhibitor to be approved by the FDA on December 31, 1998. Control of this blockbuster drug was often mentioned as a key reason for Pfizer's acquisition of Pharmacia.

Monsanto merged with Pharmacia & Upjohn in 2001, including the Searle pharmaceutical assets. After spinning off its agrochemical and biotechnical business units under the Monsanto name, the new company (known as Pharmacia) was acquired by Pfizer in 2003.

== Products ==
The company manufactures prescription drugs and nuclear medicine imaging equipment. Searle is known for its release of Enovid, the first commercial oral contraceptive, in 1960.

In 1996, the FDA removed all restrictions on the use of aspartame, which enabled its use in heated and baked goods. G. D. Searle's patent on aspartame was extended in 1981 and ultimately expired in December 1992.
