= Gideon Daniel Searle =

American druggist

Gideon Daniel Searle (February 13, 1846 Randolph County, Indiana - January 22, 1917 Chicago, Illinois) was a druggist and the founder of pharmaceutical company G.D. Searle, LLC.

The company was founded in Omaha, Nebraska in 1888, moved to Chicago in 1910 before moving to Skokie, Illinois. The company was acquired by Monsanto in 1987 for $2.7 billion. His father Herman Searle helped establish a Congregational church.
