= Matthew Continetti =

American journalist (born 1981)

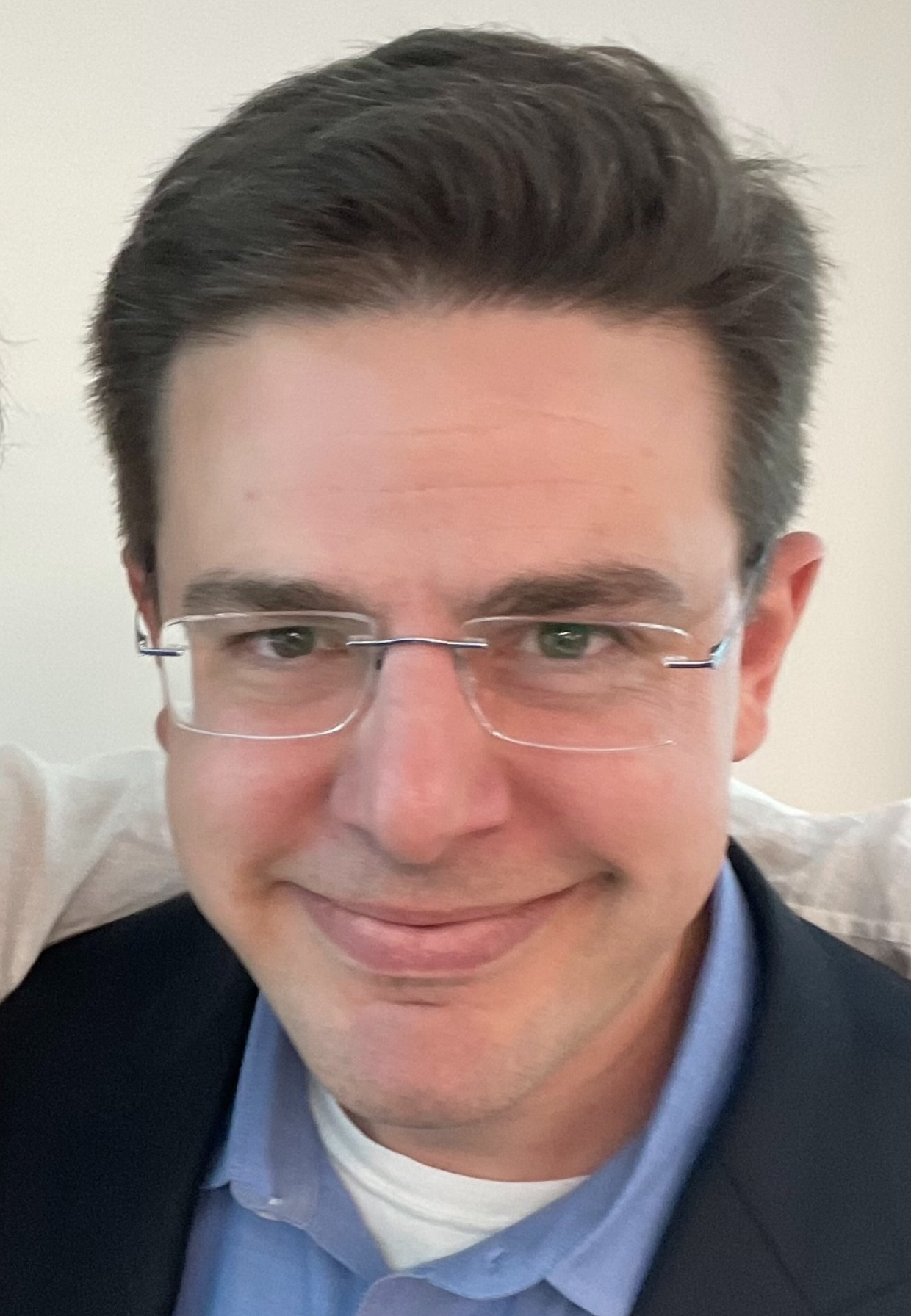
- Born: Matthew Joseph Continetti; June 24, 1981 (age 45); Alexandria, Virginia, U.S.
- Education: Columbia University (BA)
- Occupation: Journalist
- Spouse: Anne Elizabeth Kristol (m. 2012)
- Relatives: William Kristol (father-in-law)

Matthew Joseph Continetti (born June 24, 1981) is an American journalist and Director of Domestic Policy Studies at the American Enterprise Institute and as of 2025, a columnist for The Wall Street Journal and a contributor to its Potomac Watch podcast.

== Early life and education ==
Continetti was born in Alexandria, Virginia, on June 24, 1981, the son of Cathy (née Finn) and Joseph F. Continetti. Continetti graduated from Columbia University in 2003. While in college, he wrote for the Columbia Spectator, the Intercollegiate Studies Institute's magazine, CAMPUS, and Columbia Political Review. In summer 2002, he did an internship for the Intercollegiate Studies Institute's student journalism program, Collegiate Network, at National Review, where he was a research assistant to its editor, Rich Lowry.

== Career ==
Following college, he joined The Weekly Standard as an editorial assistant, and later became associate editor. In 2011, he was a Claremont Institute Lincoln Fellow. He is now a contributing editor to National Review. He has written for The New York Times, The Wall Street Journal, National Review, The Washington Post, the Los Angeles Times, and The Financial Times. He has also been an on-camera contributor to Bloggingheads.tv.

He has criticized Glenn Beck as "nonsense." He has argued the American media turned on Sarah Palin during the 2008 campaign because they had blind allegiance to Barack Obama. He has criticized American academia as uniformly left-wing.

From October 2015 to May 2016, the Washington Free Beacon, under Continetti's stewardship, hired Fusion GPS to conduct opposition research on "multiple candidates" during the 2016 presidential election, including Donald Trump. The Free Beacon stopped funding his research when Trump was selected as the Republican Party nominee.

== Personal life ==
Continetti lives in Arlington County, Virginia. He is married to Anne Elizabeth Kristol, the daughter of William Kristol, Vice President Dan Quayle's Chief of Staff. Continetti converted to Judaism in 2011, prior to his marriage to Kristol. In May 2023, the Russian Foreign Ministry sanctioned Continetti and barred him from entry, along with 500 other Americans.

== Bibliography ==
- The K Street Gang: The Rise and Fall of the Republican Machine, Doubleday (2006)
- The Persecution of Sarah Palin: How the Elite Media Tried to Bring Down a Rising Star, Sentinel (2009)
- The Right: The Hundred-Year War for American Conservatism, Basic Books (2022)
