= Gary Schmitt =

American political scientist (born 1952)

- Born: 1952 (age 73–74)
- Education: University of Dallas; University of Chicago

Gary James Schmitt (born 1952) is an American political scientist who is a senior fellow at the American Enterprise Institute.

== Early life and education ==
Schmitt graduated from the University of Dallas in 1974 with a B.A. in Politics and the University of Chicago in 1980 with a Ph.D. in political science.

== Career ==
From 1977 to 1979, Schmitt held a research position at the White Burkett Miller Center, University of Virginia.

In the early 1980s, Schmitt worked as a member of the professional staff of the Senate Select Committee on Intelligence and, from 1982 to 1984, served as the committee's minority staff director. From 1984 to 1988 he held the post of executive director of President Reagan's Foreign Intelligence Advisory Board. Since then, he has held visiting fellowships at the National Interest, a foreign policy journal, and the Brookings Institution, served as Coordinator for the Consortium for the Study of Intelligence's Working Group on Intelligence Reform, and worked as a consultant to the Department of Defense. In addition, he has been an adjunct professor at the Paul H. Nitze School of Advanced International Studies, Johns Hopkins University.

Schmitt helped found, and he was executive director of, the Project for the New American Century (PNAC), a key neoconservative organization formed in 1997 to promote a forward-leaning American national security agenda. The organization supported NATO expansion, democracy promotion, and the decision to go to war in Iraq and Afghanistan, while at the same time criticizing how those wars were waged. PNAC also advocated for enhanced support for Taiwan by the US and its allies, while also being critical of successive administrations' policies towards the People's Republic of China.

At AEI since 2005, he has been director of the Program on Advanced Strategic Studies, director of the American Citizenship Program and co-director of the Marilyn Ware Center for Security Studies. He is currently a fellow in AEI's Social, Cultural, and Constitutional Studies Program. As of 2024, he remains a senior fellow in the Social, Cultural, and Constitutional Studies program at the American Enterprise Institute (AEI).

== Books ==
- McCulloch v. Maryland at 200: Debating John Marshall’s Jurisprudence (AEI Press: 2020)
- A Hard Look at Hard Power: Assessing the Defense Capabilities of Key US Allies and Security Partners, (US Army War College Press: 2020)
- Rise of the Revisionists: Russia, China, and Iran (AEI Press: 2018)
- The Imperial Presidency and the Constitution (Rowman & Littlefield: 2017)
- Is Congress Broken? The Virtues and Defects of Partisanship and Gridlock (Brookings Institution Press: 2017)
- "The Professions and Civic Life” (Lexington Books: 2016)
- Trendsetting Charter Schools: Raising the Bar for Civic Education (Rowman & Littlefield: 2015)
- Safety, Liberty and Islamist Terrorism: American and European Approaches to Domestic Counterterrorism (AEI Press: 2010)
- The Rise of China: Essays on the Future Competition (Encounter Books: May 2009)
- Of Men and Materiel: The Crisis in Military Resources (AEI Press: 2007)
- Silent Warfare: Understanding the World of Intelligence (Brassey's: 2002), coauthored with Abram N. Shulsky
- U.S. Intelligence at the Crossroads: Agendas for Reform (Brassey's: 1995)
