= Foreign Policy Initiative =

American think tank

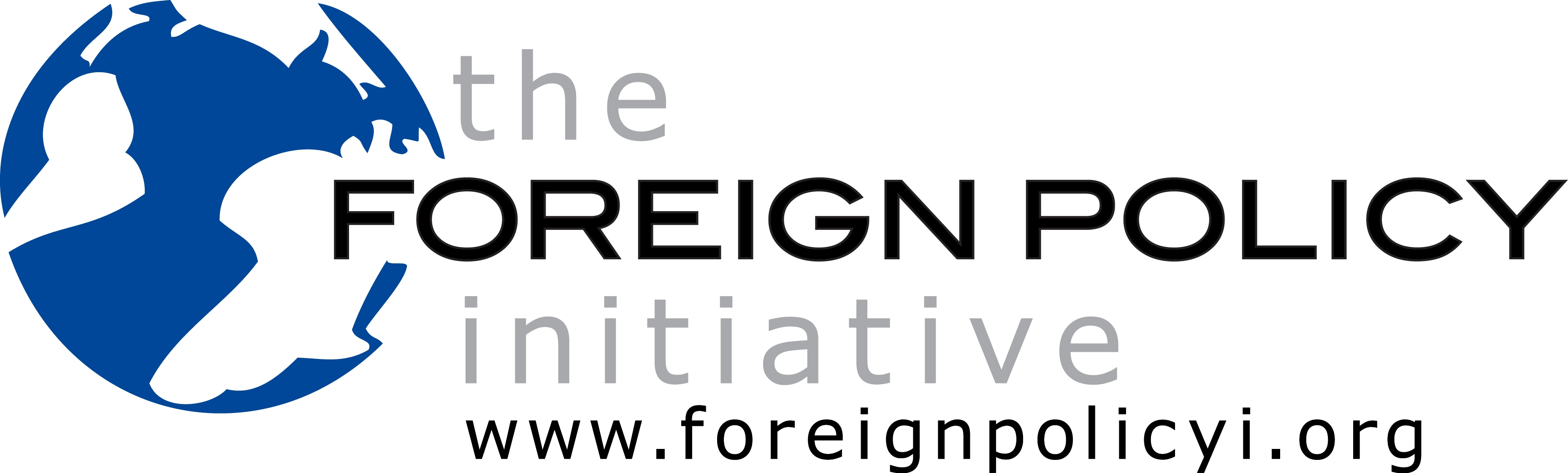
- Established: 2009; 17 years ago
- Executive Director: Christopher J. Griffin
- Location: Washington, D.C., U.S.
- Website: foreignpolicyi.org (since relinquished)
- Dissolved: 2017

The Foreign Policy Initiative (FPI) was an American neo-conservative think tank that operated from 2009 to 2017. In many ways it was a successor organization to Project for the New American Century.

FPI's Board of Directors consisted of former Undersecretary of Defense for Policy Eric S. Edelman, Dan Senor, former editor of the now-defunct The Weekly Standard Bill Kristol, and Brookings Institution Senior Fellow Robert Kagan. The latter two were project directors of the neoconservative Project for the New American Century.

== Background and history ==
The Foreign Policy Initiative was founded in 2009 by Weekly Standard editor Bill Kristol, Dan Senor, and Robert Kagan. The main seed donor was Paul Singer.

The Foreign Policy Initiative advocated for the troop surge in the Afghanistan War.

Chris Griffin, a former legislative director of Connecticut Senator Joe Lieberman, was hired as executive director in early 2013. He replaced Jamie Fly, who served as director for the organization's first four years and left to become an adviser for Florida Senator Marco Rubio.

In 2017, it was announced Foreign Policy Initiative would shut down its operations.

== Issues ==
=== Foreign affairs ===
In an interview with Foreign Policy In Focus, Robert Kagan iterated FPI's position toward Iran, saying, "It is time to take military action against the Iranian government elements that support terrorism and its nuclear program. More diplomacy is not an adequate response."

On Fox News, Griffin described what would be a "good deal" for the U.S., with regards to Iran. Iran would comply with longstanding demands from the United States, IAEA, and UN Security Council, freeze its nuclear program, and ratify the additional protocol to IAEA safeguards agreement. Griffin also said that Iran has 7,000 kg of 3.5% "low-enriched uranium," which amounts to 70 percent progress toward having a nuclear weapon. He also called out Iran to stop building and disable the heavy water nuclear reactor at Arak, which is a basis for building a plutonium-based nuclear weapon.

According to Executive Director Christopher Griffin, Russia's intervention in the Crimean Peninsula was part of a trend that has resulted "in an absence of American leadership" and that "'global pressure' against the American-led international order is intensifying." On NBC Nightly News on April 10, 2013, Griffin noted, "What North Korea teaches us is that once a rogue regime has a nuclear weapon, we have not figured out how to reliably contain it, how to protect Americans, or how to protect our allies." FPI has also called for the U.S. Department of Defense to cancel a $572 million contract with Rosoboronexport, Russia's government-owned arms exporter.

FPI proposed an active U.S. role in Syria. In 2012, Slate Magazine wrote, "The most forward-looking part of the FPI's conference came when the French philosopher Bernard-Henri Levy chatted with Sen. John McCain (a PNAC signatory and contributing writer). They quickly agreed that America needed to intervene in Syria, setting up a partial no-fly zone and arming rebels." FPI advocated using Patriot missile-defense batteries, with Executive Director Griffin noting, "The United States and our allies could use the Patriot missile-defence batteries now deployed in southern Turkey to establish a credible threat against Assad's air power over parts of Aleppo and Idlib provinces [in northern Syria]."

== Board of directors ==
- William Kristol
- Eric Edelman
- Dan Senor
- Robert Kagan

== Bibliography of works on Foreign Policy Initiative (FPI) ==
- Abelson, Donald E. (2009). Do Think Tanks Matter?: Assessing the Impact of Public Policy Institutes. Montreal, Quebec: McGill-Queen's University Press. p. 43. ISBN 9780773536074.
- "As U.S. Shifts Its Focus To Asia, It Must Boost, Not Cut, Defense". Investor's Business Daily. 5 June 2012.
- Bell, Benjamin (22 March 2014). "Five Questions with Foreign Policy Initiative Co-Founder Dan Senor". ABC News.
- Edelman, Eric; Misztal, Blaise; Abramowitz, Morton (21 March 2014). "The U.S. Should Unfollow Turkey". The American Interest.
- "Forbes To Discuss Asia Strategy With Asian Diplomats at Foreign Policy Initiative's Annual Forum". Congressional Documents and Publications. 21 October 2013.
- Gibson, William (18 January 2013). "Marco Rubio beefs up foreign policy staff". Sun-Sentinel (Fort Lauderdale, Florida).
- Griffin, Christopher (8 February 2014). "The War of Wills Between U.S. and Iran". RealClearWorld.
- Griffin, Christopher (28 July 2007). "Two Votes Over Tokyo". The Washington Post. Republished at American Enterprise Institute.
- Griffin, Christopher; Lohaus, Phillip. (13 March 2014). "Joint Strike Fighter: No Longer Just 'Too Big to Kill'". RealClearDefense.
- Kagan, Robert (27 February 2014). "The Ambivalent Superpower". POLITICO Magazine.
- Kirchick, James (24 March 2014). "Europe, Stunned by Reckless Russia, Mistrusts Feckless Ukrainian Leaders". The Daily Beast.
- Leverett, Flynt; Leverett, Hillary Mann. (2013). Going to Tehran: Why the United States Must Come to Terms with the Islamic Republic of Iran. London, U.K.: Macmillan. p. 296. ISBN 9780805094190.
- Rubin, Jennifer (27 February 2014). "Our next president must be the anti-Obama". The Washington Post.
- "Sen. John McCain, R-ARIZ., Participates In A Discussion On The Consequences Of Inaction In Syria". Congressional Quarterly Transcriptions (Washington, D.C.: CQ - Roll Call, Inc). 27 November 2012.
- Zarate, Robert; Moore, Evan (18 October 2012). "How To Fix the U.S. Policy Toward Syria". U.S. News & World Report.
