= List of Republicans who opposed the Donald Trump 2016 presidential campaign =

This is a list of Republicans and conservatives who announced their opposition to the election of Donald Trump, the 2016 Republican Party nominee and eventual winner of the election, as the president of the United States. It also includes former Republicans who left the party due to their opposition to Trump and as well as Republicans who endorsed a different candidate. It includes Republican presidential primary election candidates that announced opposition to Trump as the nominee. Some of the Republicans on this list threw their support to Trump after he won the presidential election, while many of them continue to oppose Trump. Offices listed are those held at the time of the 2016 election.

== Government officials ==
=== Former U.S. presidents ===
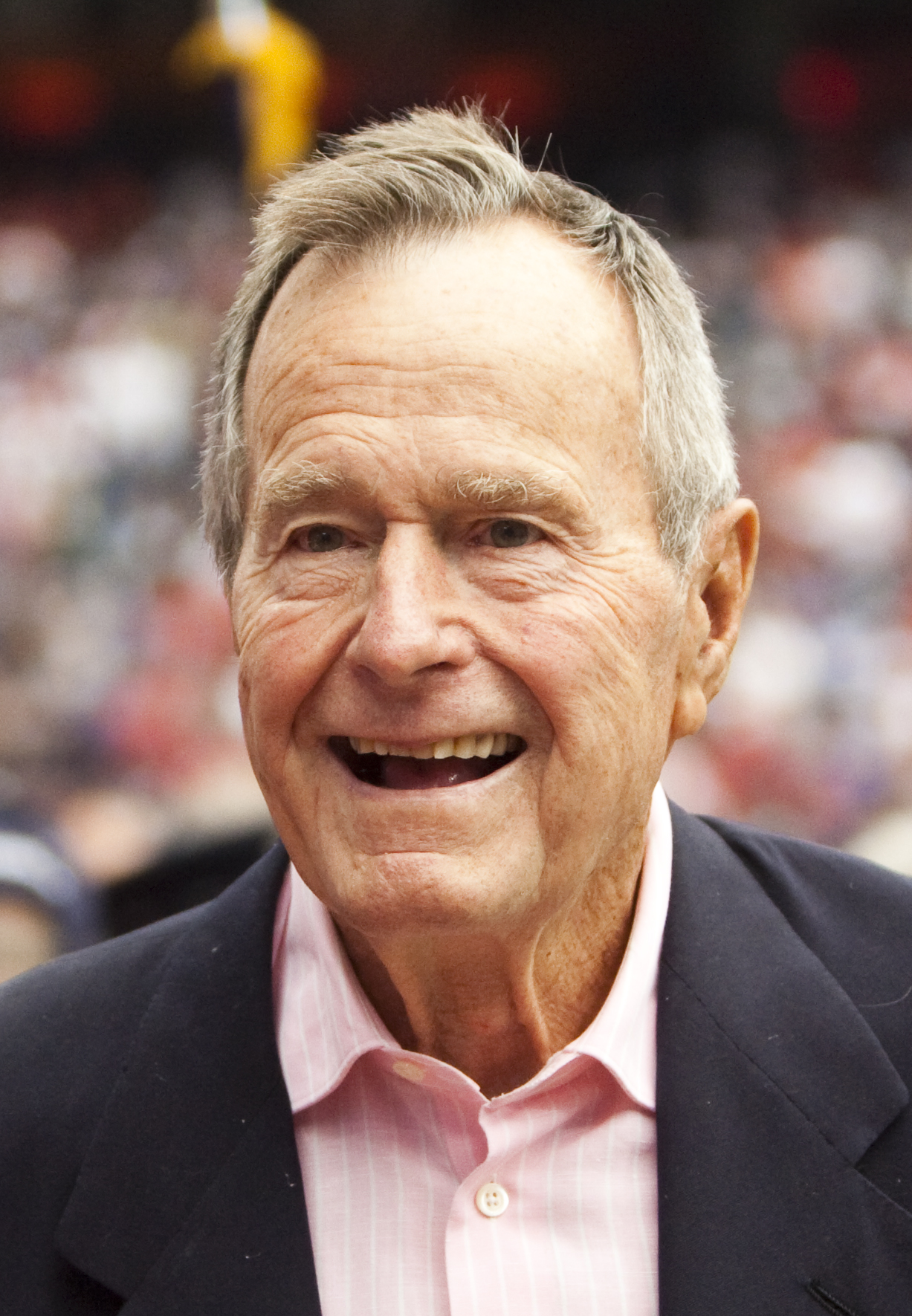
Former President George H. W. Bush

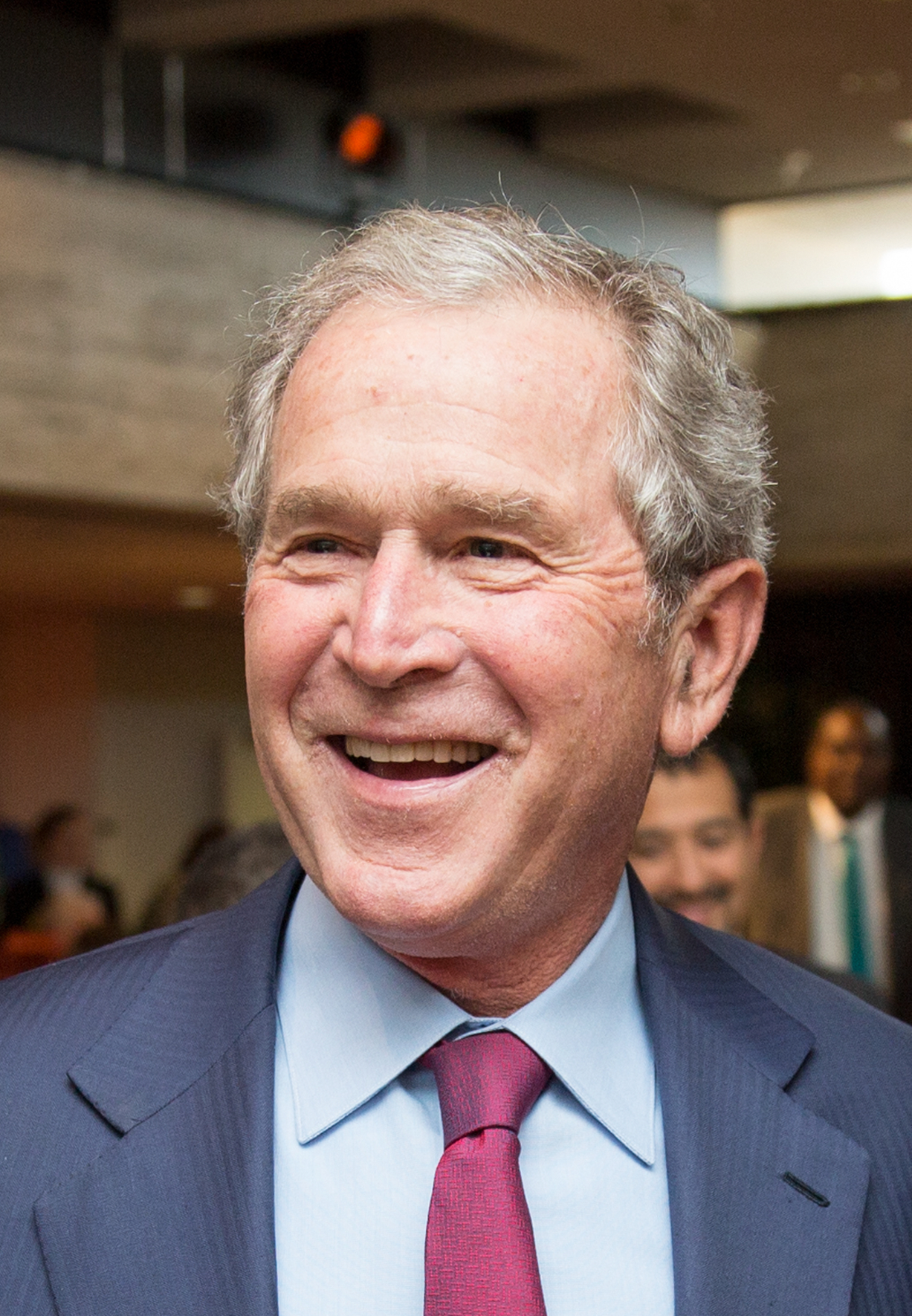
Former President George W. Bush

- George H. W. Bush, president of the United States (1989–1993); vice president of the United States (1981–1989) (allegedly voted for Hillary Clinton)
- George W. Bush, president of the United States (2001–2009); governor of Texas (1995–2000) (blanked ballot)

=== Former 2016 Republican presidential primary candidates ===
All candidates signed a pledge to eventually support the party nominee. The following refused to honor it after Trump became the Republican presidential nominee.

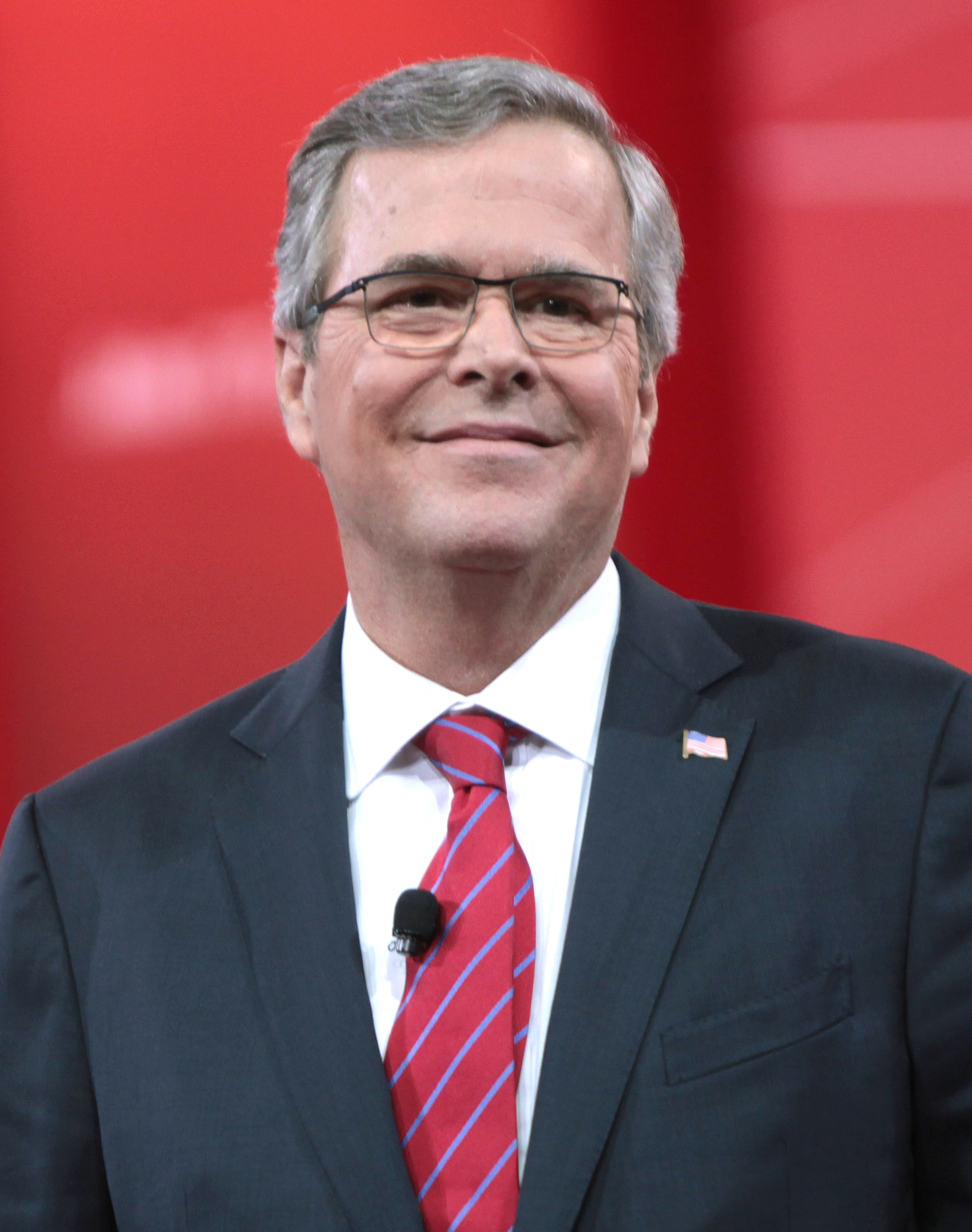
Former Florida Governor Jeb Bush

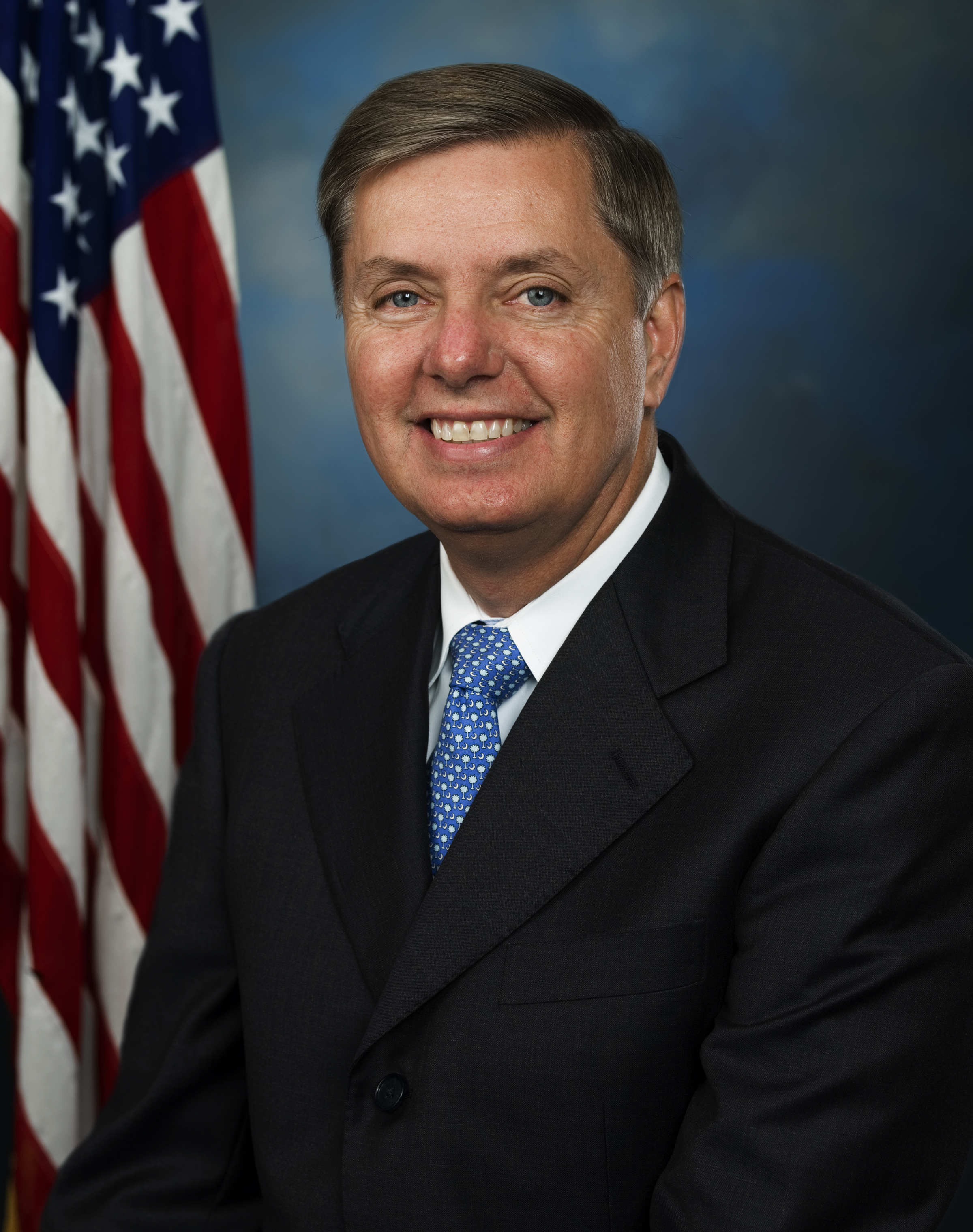
Senator Lindsey Graham

- Jeb Bush, governor of Florida (1999–2007)
- Mark Everson, Commissioner of Internal Revenue (2003–2007)
- Carly Fiorina, (Note: Withdrew endorsement) (Note: Called on Trump to withdraw his candidacy) CEO of Hewlett-Packard (1999–2005); 2010 nominee for U.S. senator from California (originally endorsed Trump for the general election but called for Mike Pence to take his place as nominee after the Access Hollywood tape surfaced)
- Lindsey Graham, United States senator from South Carolina (2003–2026) (voted for Evan McMullin)
- John Kasich, governor of Ohio (2011–2019); U.S. representative from Ohio (1983–2001) (wrote in John McCain)
- George Pataki, governor of New York (1995–2006)

=== Former federal cabinet-level officials ===
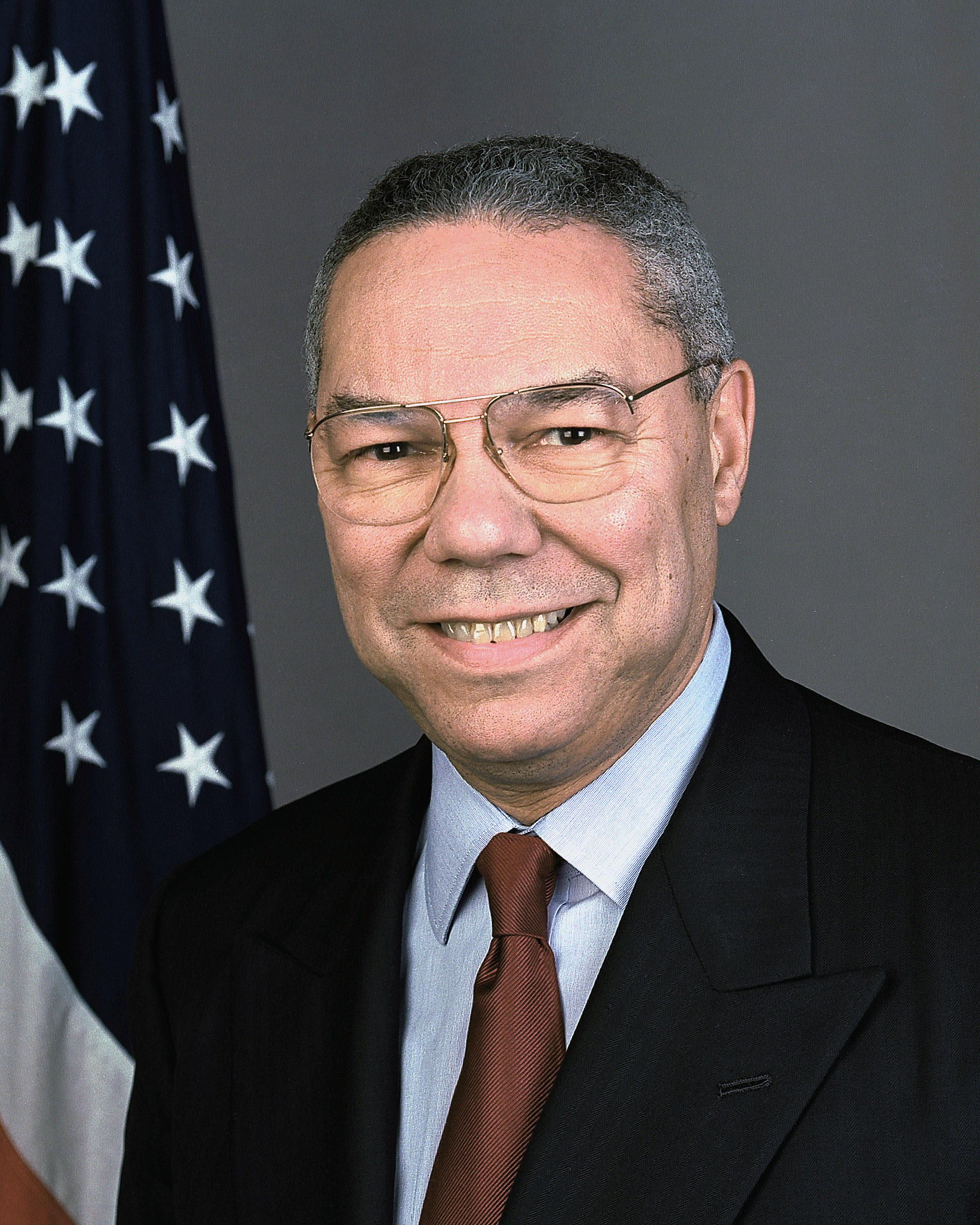
Former Secretary of State Colin Powell

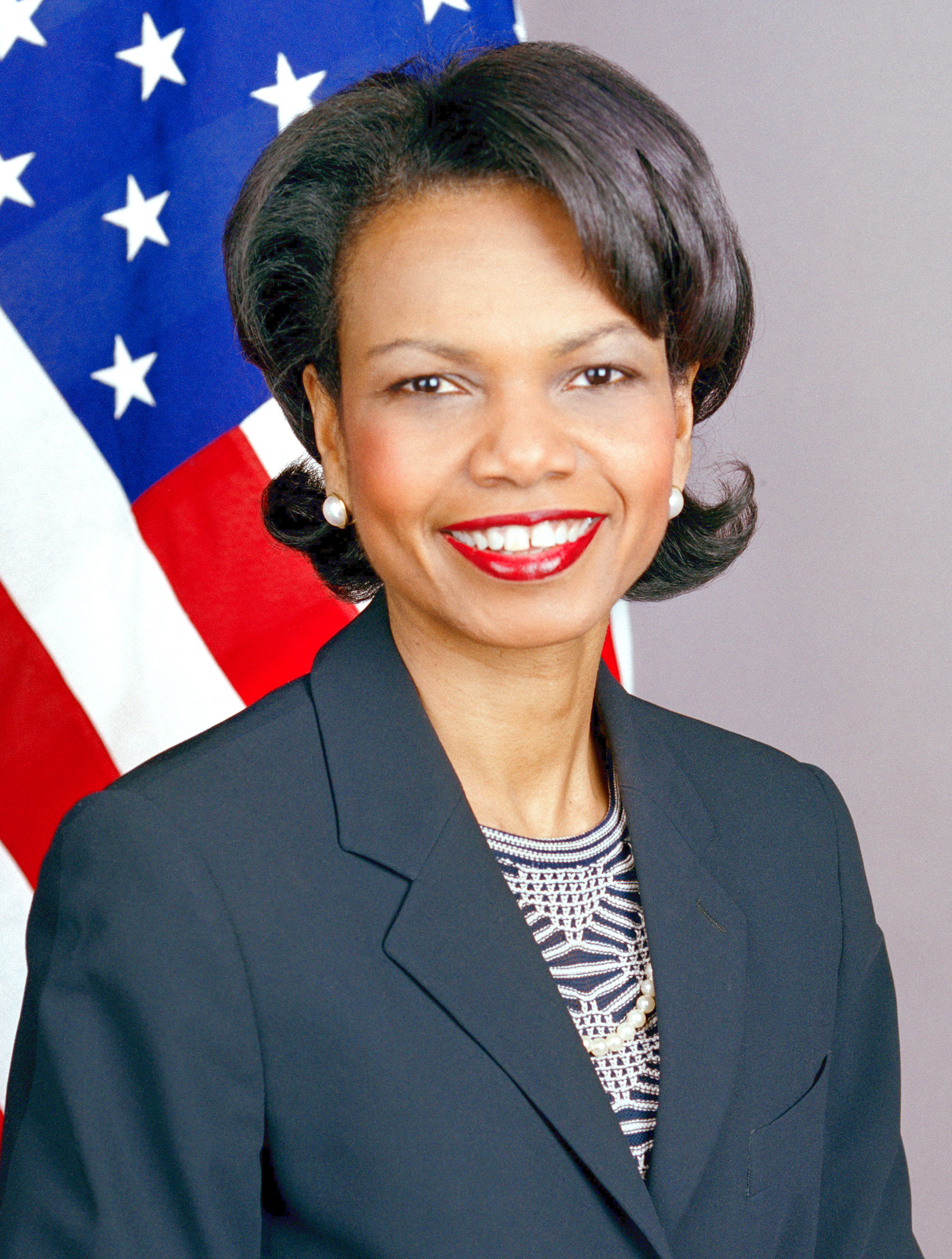
Former Secretary of State Condoleezza Rice

- William Bennett, director of the Office of National Drug Control Policy (1989–1990); United States Secretary of Education (1985–1988)
- Bill Brock, United States Secretary of Labor (1985–1987); United States Trade Representative (1981–1985); U.S. senator from Tennessee (1971–1977); chair of the Republican National Committee (1977–1981)
- Michael Chertoff, United States Secretary of Homeland Security (2005–2009); judge of the United States Court of Appeals for the Third Circuit (2003–2005) (endorsed Hillary Clinton)
- Bill Cohen, United States Secretary of Defense (1997–2001); United States senator from Maine (1979–1997) (endorsed Hillary Clinton)
- Robert Gates, United States Secretary of Defense (2006–2011); Director of Central Intelligence (1991–1993)
- Carlos Gutierrez, United States Secretary of Commerce (2005–2009) (endorsed Hillary Clinton)
- Carla Anderson Hills, United States Secretary of Housing and Urban Development (1975–1977), United States Trade Representative (1989–1993) (endorsed Hillary Clinton)
- Ray LaHood, United States Secretary of Transportation (2009–2013), U.S. representative from Illinois (1995–2009)
- Greg Mankiw, chair of the Council of Economic Advisers (2003–2005)
- Mel Martinez, United States Secretary of Housing and Urban Development (2001–2003); United States senator from Florida (2005–2009); general chair of the Republican National Committee (2007)
- Michael Mukasey, United States attorney general (2007–2009)
- John Negroponte, United States Ambassador to the United Nations (2001–2004); director of National Intelligence (2005–2007); United States Deputy Secretary of State (2007–2009) (endorsed Hillary Clinton)
- Henry Paulson, United States Secretary of the Treasury (2006–2009) (endorsed Hillary Clinton)
- Colin Powell, United States Secretary of State (2001–2005), National Security Advisor (1987–1989) (voted for Hillary Clinton)
- William K. Reilly, administrator of the Environmental Protection Agency (1989–1992) (endorsed Hillary Clinton)
- Condoleezza Rice, United States Secretary of State (2005–2009), National Security Advisor (2001–2005)
- Tom Ridge, United States Secretary of Homeland Security (2003–2005); Homeland Security Advisor (2001–2003); governor of Pennsylvania (1995–2001)
- William Ruckelshaus, Administrator of the Environmental Protection Agency (1970–1973, 1983–1985) (endorsed Hillary Clinton)
- Brent Scowcroft, National Security Advisor (1975–1977, 1989–1993); chair of the President's Intelligence Advisory Board (2001–2005) (endorsed Hillary Clinton)
- George P. Shultz, United States Secretary of Labor (1969–1970); Director of the Office of Management and Budget (1970–1972); United States Secretary of the Treasury (1972–1974); United States Secretary of State (1982–1989)
- Louis Wade Sullivan, United States Secretary of Health and Human Services (1989–1993) (endorsed Hillary Clinton)
- Christine Todd Whitman, Administrator of the Environmental Protection Agency (2001–2003); governor of New Jersey (1994–2001) (endorsed Hillary Clinton)
- Paul Wolfowitz, president of the World Bank Group (2005–2007); United States Deputy Secretary of Defense (2001–2005)
- Robert Zoellick, president of the World BankDIPI Group (2007–2012); U.S. Trade Representative (2001–2005); United States Deputy Secretary of State (2005–2006)

=== Governors ===
==== Sitting ====
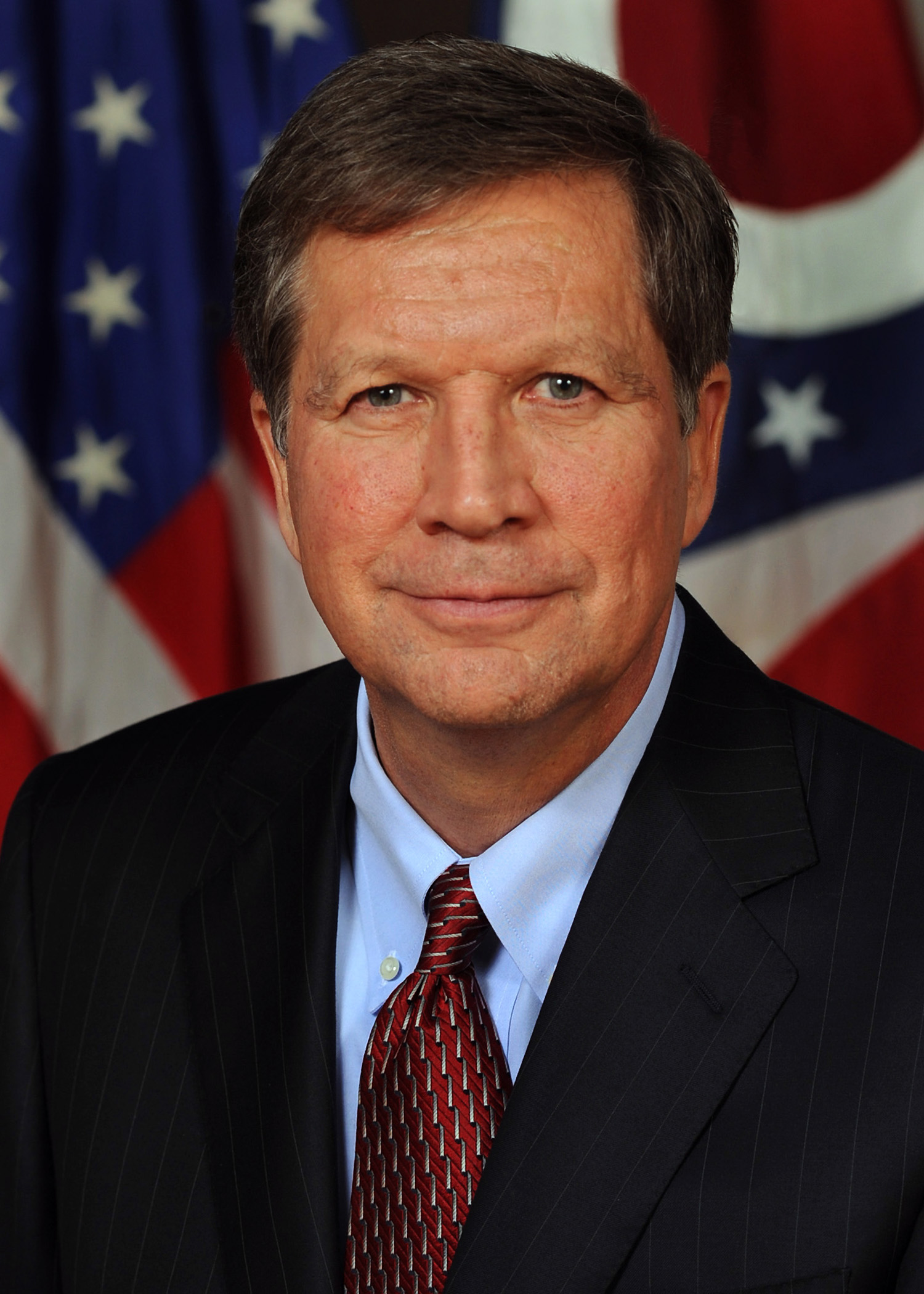
Ohio Governor John Kasich

- Charlie Baker, Massachusetts (2015–2023) (blanked ballot)
- Robert J. Bentley, Alabama (2011–2017)
- Dennis Daugaard, South Dakota (2011–2019)
- Bill Haslam, Tennessee (2011–2019)
- Gary Herbert, Utah (2009–2021)
- Larry Hogan, Maryland (2015–2023) (wrote in father Lawrence Hogan)
- John Kasich, Ohio (2011–2019)
- Susana Martinez, New Mexico (2011–2019); chair of the Republican Governors Association (2015–2016)
- Bruce Rauner, Illinois (2015–2019)
- Brian Sandoval, Nevada (2011–2019)
- Rick Snyder, Michigan (2011–2019)

==== Former ====
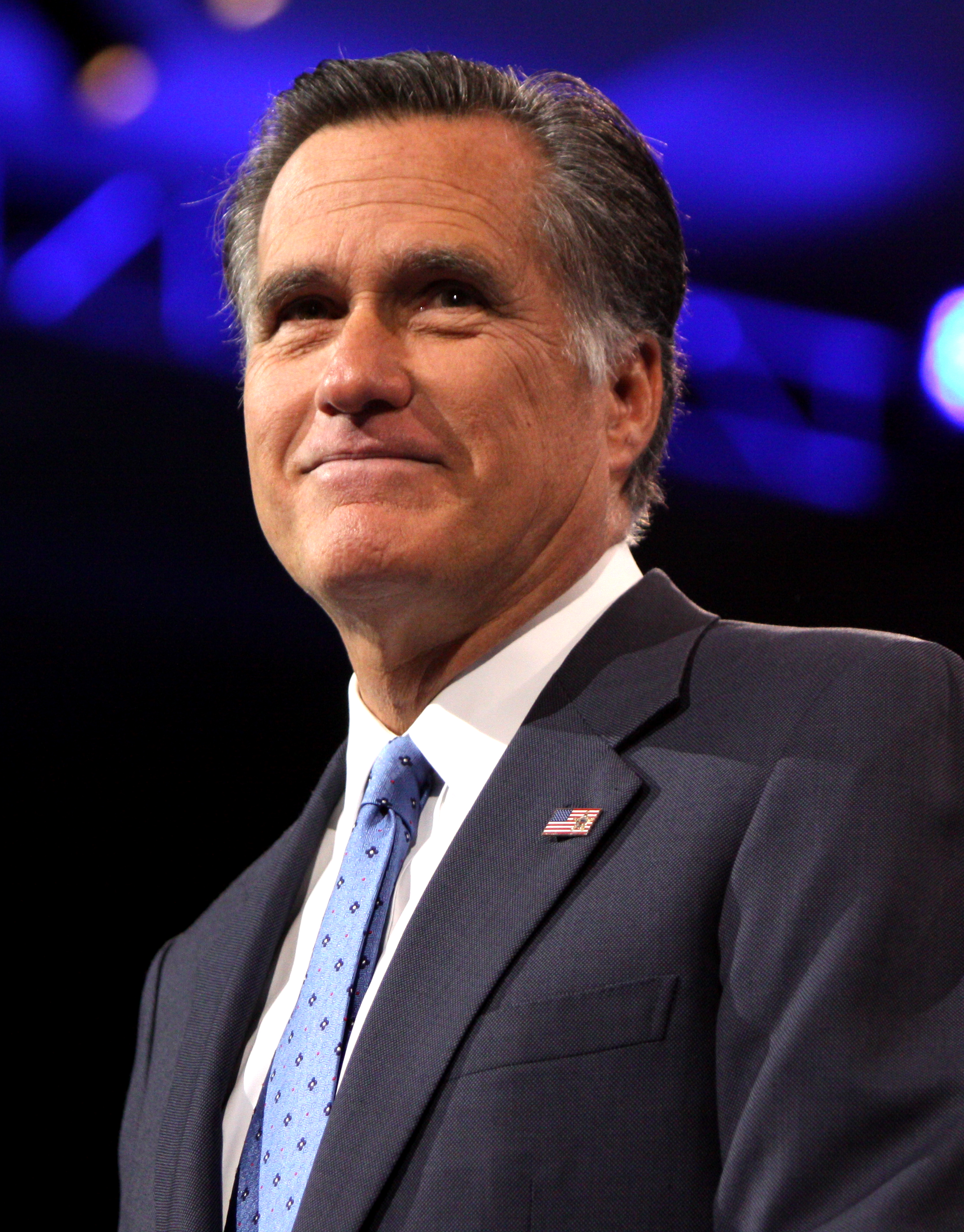
Former Massachusetts governor and 2012 nominee for president Mitt Romney

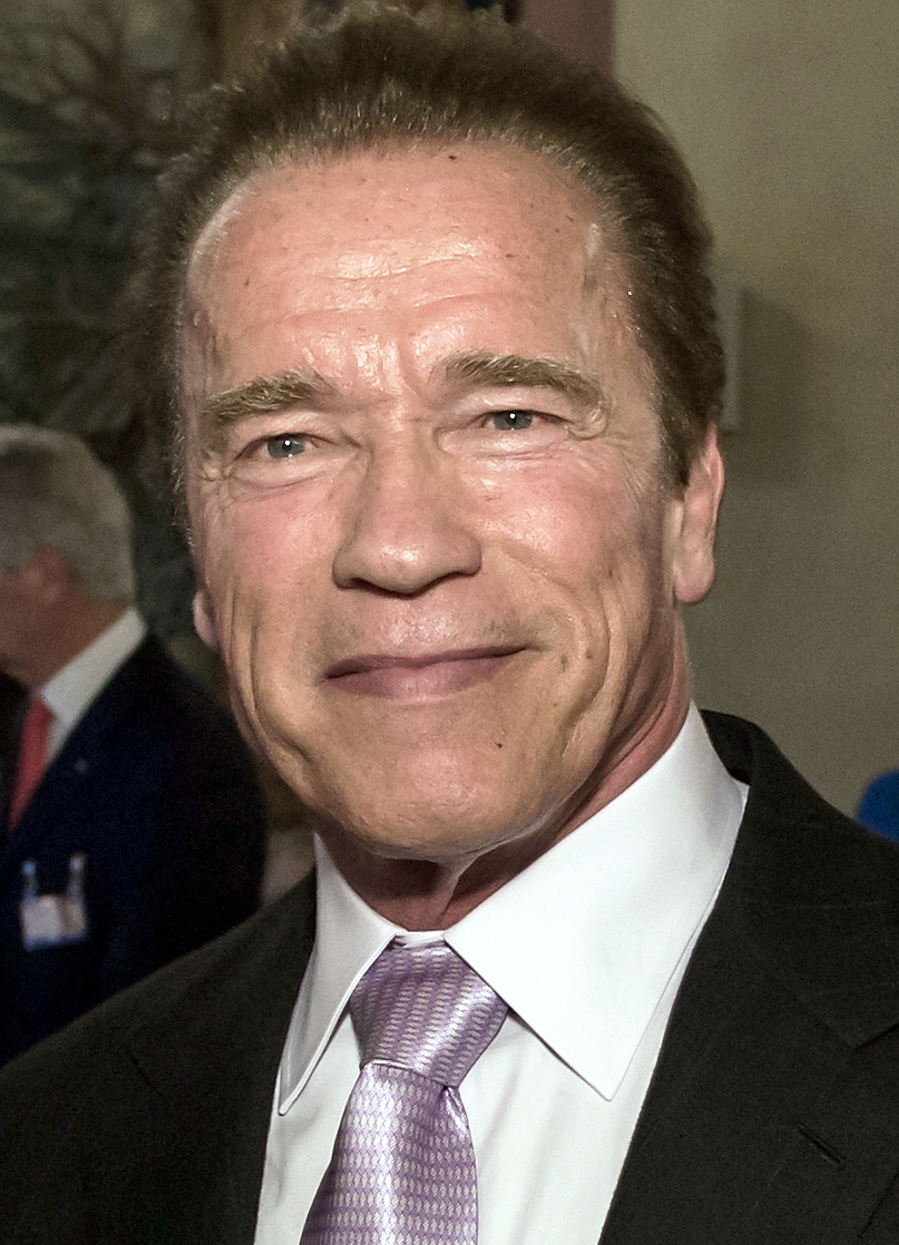
Actor and former California governor Arnold Schwarzenegger

- Arne Carlson, Minnesota (1991–1999) (endorsed Hillary Clinton)
- Jim Douglas, Vermont (2003–2011)
- A. Linwood Holton Jr., Virginia (1970–1974); Assistant Secretary of State for Legislative Affairs (1974–1975) (endorsed Hillary Clinton) (father in law of running mate Tim Kaine)
- Jon Huntsman Jr., governor of Utah (2005–2009); United States Ambassador to Russia (2017–2019); United States Ambassador to China (2009–2011); United States Ambassador to Singapore (1992–1993)
- Gary Johnson, New Mexico (1995–2003) (2016 Libertarian nominee for president)
- William Milliken, Michigan (1969–1983) (endorsed Hillary Clinton)
- Kay A. Orr, Nebraska (1987–1991)
- ~~Tim Pawlenty, Minnesota (2003–2011)~~ (voted for Trump)
- Al Quie, Minnesota (1979–1983)
- Marc Racicot, Montana (1993–2001); chair of the Republican National Committee (2001–2003)
- Mitt Romney, Massachusetts (2003–2007), 2012 nominee for president (wrote in wife Ann Romney)
- Arnold Schwarzenegger, California (2003–2011) (wrote in John Kasich)
- Jane Swift, Massachusetts (2001–2003) (voted for Hillary Clinton)
- Bill Weld, Massachusetts (1991–1997) (2016 Libertarian nominee for vice president)

=== U.S. senators ===
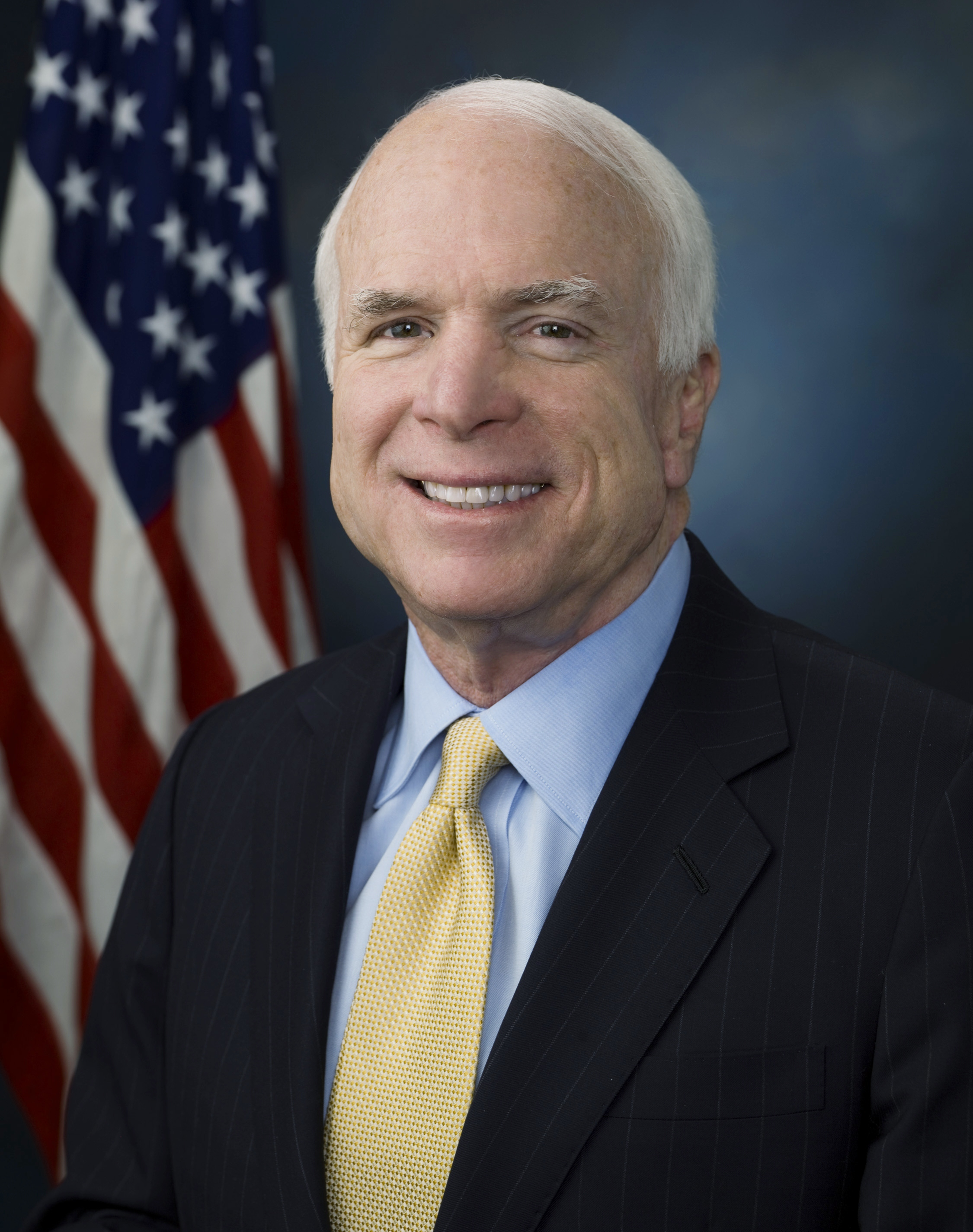
Arizona Senator and 2008 nominee for president John McCain

==== Sitting ====
- Kelly Ayotte, (Note: Withdrew intended vote) New Hampshire (2011–2017) (wrote in Mike Pence)
- Susan Collins, Maine (1997–present) (wrote in Paul Ryan)
- Jeff Flake, Arizona (2013–2019) (voted for Evan McMullin)
- Cory Gardner, Colorado (2015–2021) (wrote in Mike Pence)
- ~~Dean Heller, Nevada (2011–2019)~~ (voted for Trump)
- Mike Lee, Utah (2011–present) (voted for Evan McMullin)
- Mark Kirk, Illinois (2010–2017) (wrote in Colin Powell)
- John McCain, Arizona (1987–2018); 2008 nominee for president (wrote in Lindsey Graham)
- Lisa Murkowski, Alaska (2002–present)
- Rob Portman, Ohio (2011–2023); United States Trade Representative (2005–2006), director of the Office of Management and Budget (2006–2007) (wrote in Mike Pence)
- Ben Sasse, Nebraska (2015–2023)
- Dan Sullivan, Alaska (2015–present) (wrote in Mike Pence)

==== Former ====
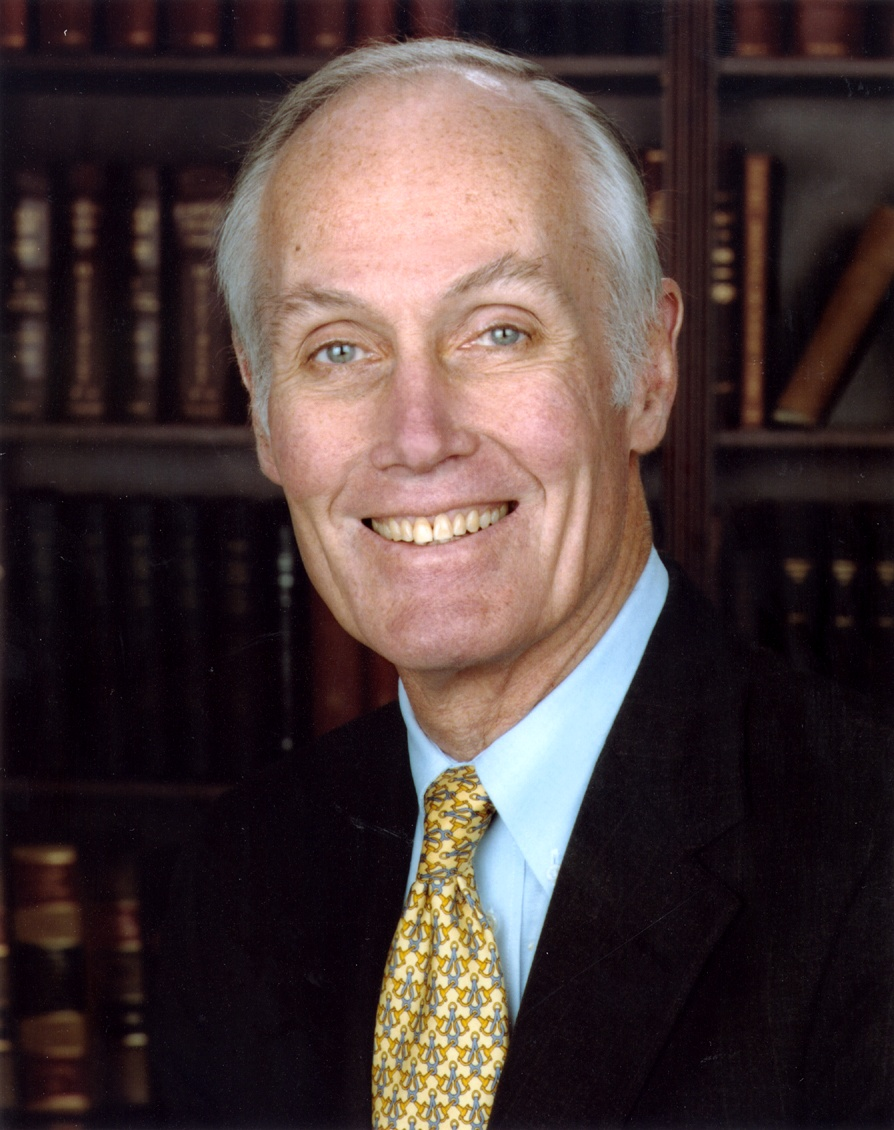
Former Washington Senator Slade Gorton

- James Buckley, U.S. Senator from New York (1971–1977)
- Norm Coleman, Minnesota (2003–2009)
- David Durenberger, Minnesota (1978–1995) (endorsed Hillary Clinton)
- Slade Gorton, Washington (1981–1987, 1989–2001) (endorsed Evan McMullin)
- Phil Gramm, Texas (1985–2002)
- Gordon J. Humphrey, New Hampshire (1979–1990) (endorsed Hillary Clinton)
- George LeMieux, Florida (2009–2011)
- Olympia Snowe, Maine (1995–2013)
- Paul Trible, Virginia (1983–1989)
- John Warner, Virginia (1979–2009); United States Secretary of the Navy (1972–1974) (endorsed Hillary Clinton)

=== U.S. representatives ===
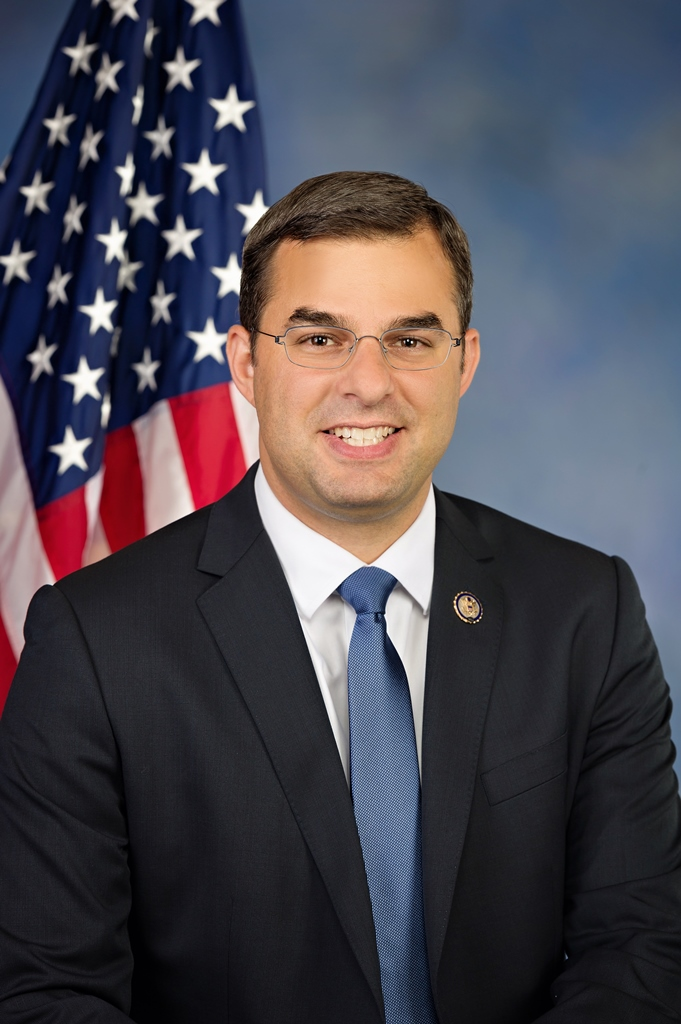
Michigan U.S. Representative Justin Amash

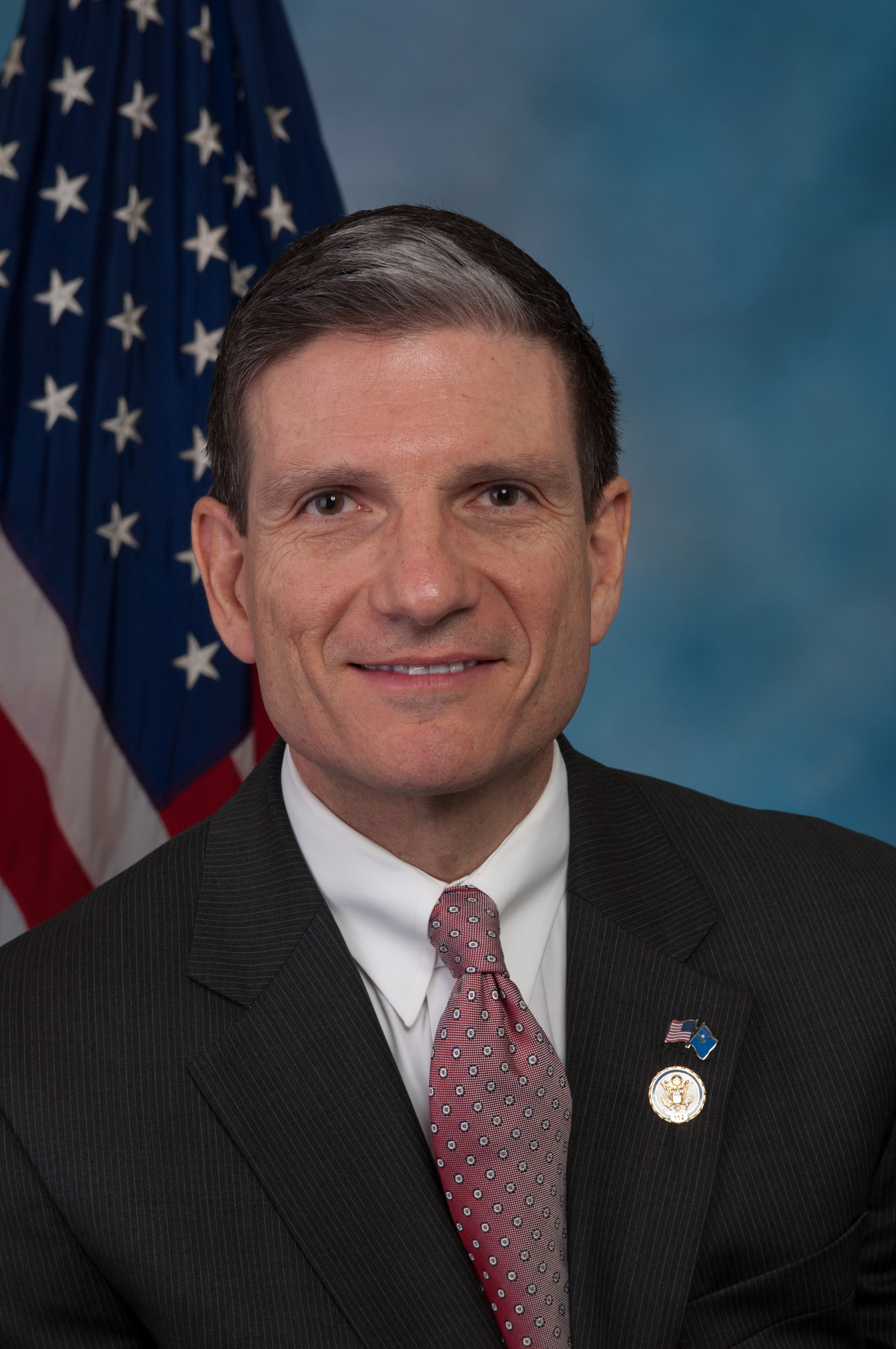
Nevada U.S. Representative and 2016 nominee for U.S. Senate Joe Heck

==== Sitting ====
- Justin Amash, Michigan (2011–2021) (wrote in Rand Paul)
- ~~Jason Chaffetz, Utah (2009–2017)~~ (voted for Trump)
- Mike Coffman, Colorado (2009–2019)
- Barbara Comstock, Virginia (2015–2019)
- Carlos Curbelo, Florida (2015–2019)
- Rodney Davis, Illinois (2013–2023)
- Charlie Dent, Pennsylvania (2005–2018)
- Bob Dold, Illinois (2011–2013, 2015–2017)
- Jeff Fortenberry, Nebraska (2005–2022)
- Kay Granger, Texas (1997–2025)
- Richard L. Hanna, New York (2011–2017) (endorsed Hillary Clinton)
- Cresent Hardy, Nevada (2015–2017)
- Joe Heck, Nevada (2011–2017); 2016 nominee for U.S. Senate
- Jaime Herrera Beutler, Washington (2011–2023) (wrote in Paul Ryan)
- Will Hurd, Texas (2015–2021)
- David Jolly, Florida (2014–2017)
- John Katko, New York (2015–2023)
- Adam Kinzinger, Illinois (2011–2023)
- Steve Knight, California (2015–2019)
- Frank LoBiondo, New Jersey (1995–2019) (wrote in Mike Pence)
- Mia Love, Utah (2015–2019)
- Pat Meehan, Pennsylvania (2011–2018)
- Erik Paulsen, Minnesota (2009–2019)
- Dave Reichert, Washington (2005–2019) (wrote in Mike Pence)
- Reid Ribble, Wisconsin (2011–2017) (voted for Evan McMullin)
- Scott Rigell, Virginia (2011–2017) (endorsed Gary Johnson)
- Martha Roby, Alabama (2011–2021)
- Tom Rooney, Florida (2009–2019)
- Ileana Ros-Lehtinen, Florida (1989–2019)
- Mike Simpson, Idaho (1999–present)
- Fred Upton, Michigan (1987–2023)
- David Valadao, California (2013–2019, 2021–present)
- ~~Ann Wagner, Missouri (2013–present)~~ (later re-endorsed)

==== Former ====
- Steve Bartlett, Texas (1983–1991)
- Bob Bauman, Maryland (1973–1981)
- Sherwood Boehlert, New York (1993–2007) (endorsed Hillary Clinton)
- Jack Buechner, Missouri (1987–1991)
- Tom Campbell, California (1989–1993, 1995–2001) (endorsed Gary Johnson)
- Bill Clinger, Pennsylvania (1979–1997)
- Tom Coleman, Missouri (1976–1993)
- Geoff Davis, Kentucky (2005–2012)
- Charles Djou, Hawaii (2010–2011)
- Mickey Edwards, Oklahoma (1977–1993)
- David F. Emery, Maine (1975–1983)
- Harris Fawell, Illinois (1985–1999)
- Paul Findley, Illinois (1961–1983)
- Ed Foreman, Texas (1963–1965, 1969–1971)
- Barry Goldwater Jr., California (1969–1983)
- Amo Houghton, New York (1987–2005)
- Bob Inglis, South Carolina (1993–1999, 2005–2011)
- Jim Kolbe, Arizona (1985–2007) (endorsed Gary Johnson)
- Steve Kuykendall, California (1999–2001)
- Jim Leach, Iowa (1977–2007)
- Pete McCloskey, California (1967–1983) (Democrat since 2007)
- Connie Morella, Maryland (1987–2003) (endorsed Hillary Clinton)
- Mike Parker, Mississippi (1989–1999); Assistant Secretary of the Army for Civil Works (2001–2002)
- Tom Petri, Wisconsin (1979–2015)
- John Porter, Illinois (1980–2001)
- Pat Saiki, Hawaii (1987–1991)
- Joe Scarborough, Florida (1995–2001); commentator and author
- Claudine Schneider, Rhode Island (1981–1991) (endorsed Hillary Clinton)
- Chris Shays, Connecticut (1987–2009) (endorsed Hillary Clinton)
- Peter Smith, Vermont (1989–1991)
- Mark Souder, Indiana (1995–2010)
- J.C. Watts, Oklahoma (1995–2003)
- Edward Weber, Ohio (1981–1983)
- Vin Weber, Minnesota (1983–1993)
- G. William Whitehurst, Virginia (1969–1987)
- Dick Zimmer, New Jersey (1991–1997) (endorsed Gary Johnson)

=== Former State Department officials ===
- Richard Armitage, Deputy Secretary of State; Assistant Secretary of Defense for International Security Affairs (endorsed Hillary Clinton)
- John B. Bellinger III, Legal Adviser of the Department of State; Legal Adviser to the National Security Council
- Robert Blackwill, United States Ambassador to India; Deputy National Security Advisor for Strategic Planning (endorsed Hillary Clinton)
- R. Nicholas Burns, Under Secretary of State for Political Affairs; United States Ambassador to NATO; United States Ambassador to Greece (endorsed Hillary Clinton)
- Eliot A. Cohen, Counselor of the United States Department of State
- Chester Crocker, Assistant Secretary of State for African Affairs
- Jendayi Frazer, Assistant Secretary of State for African Affairs
- James K. Glassman, Under Secretary of State for Public Diplomacy and Public Affairs (endorsed Hillary Clinton)
- David F. Gordon, Director of Policy Planning
- Donald Gregg, United States Ambassador to South Korea
- David A. Gross, U.S. Coordinator for International Communications and Information Policy (endorsed Hillary Clinton)
- John Hillen, Assistant Secretary of State for Political-Military Affairs
- Reuben Jeffery III, Under Secretary of State for Economic Growth, Energy, and the Environment
- Robert Joseph, Under Secretary of State for Arms Control and International Security Affairs
- David J. Kramer, Assistant Secretary of State for Democracy, Human Rights, and Labor
- Stephen D. Krasner, Director of Policy Planning
- Frank Lavin, United States Ambassador to Singapore; Under Secretary of Commerce for International Trade (endorsed Hillary Clinton)
- Robert McCallum, United States Ambassador to Australia; Acting United States Deputy Attorney General
- Richard Miles, United States Ambassador to Azerbaijan, Bulgaria, and Georgia; Acting United States Ambassador to Kyrgyzstan
- Roger Noriega, Assistant Secretary of State for Western Hemisphere Affairs
- John Osborn, Member of the U.S. Advisory Commission on Public Diplomacy
- Kristen Silverberg, Assistant Secretary of State for International Organization Affairs
- William Howard Taft IV, Legal Adviser of the Department of State; United States Ambassador to NATO; United States Deputy Secretary of Defense
- Shirin R. Tahir-Kheli, senior advisor for Women's Empowerment; Special Assistant to the President for Democracy, Human Rights and International Operations (endorsed Hillary Clinton)
- Betty Tamposi, Assistant Secretary of State for Consular Affairs (endorsed Hillary Clinton)
- Peter Teeley, United States Ambassador to Canada (endorsed Hillary Clinton)
- Robert Tuttle, United States Ambassador to the United Kingdom (endorsed Hillary Clinton)
- Philip Zelikow, Counselor of the United States Department of State

=== Former Defense Department officials ===
- Seth Cropsey, Assistant Secretary of Defense for Special Operations/Low Intensity Conflict & Interdependent Capabilities
- Michael B. Donley, United States Secretary of the Air Force (endorsed Hillary Clinton)
- Eric Edelman, Under Secretary of Defense for Policy
- Doug Feith, Under Secretary of Defense for Policy
- Robert Hastings, Acting Assistant to the Secretary of Defense for Public Affairs
- Tim Kane, United States Air Force intelligence officer; Chief Labor Economist, Joint Economic Committee
- Mary Beth Long, Assistant Secretary of Defense for International Security Affairs
- Alberto J. Mora, General Counsel of the Navy (endorsed Hillary Clinton)
- Gale Pollock, Acting Surgeon General of the United States Army (endorsed Hillary Clinton)
- Martha Rainville, Major General, United States Air Force; Vermont Adjutant General
- Michael Rubin, Defense Country Director for Iran and Iraq
- Kalev Sepp, Deputy Assistant Secretary of Defense for Special Operations Capabilities
- Matthew Waxman, Deputy Assistant Secretary of Defense for Detainee Affairs (endorsed Hillary Clinton)
- Dov Zakheim, Comptroller of the Department of Defense

=== Former National Security officials ===
- Ken Adelman, director of the Arms Control and Disarmament Agency (endorsed Hillary Clinton)
- Mike Baker, covert operations officer, Central Intelligence Agency
- Tom Donnelly, director of the Policy Group, House Armed Services Committee
- Gary Edson, Deputy National Security Advisor
- Richard Falkenrath, Deputy Homeland Security Advisor
- Peter Feaver, senior director for Strategic Planning
- Aaron Friedberg, Deputy National Security Advisor to the Vice President
- Greg Garcia, assistant secretary of Homeland Security for Cyber Security and Telecommunications
- Michael Green, senior director for Asia, National Security Council
- Paul Haenle, director for China and Taiwan, National Security Council
- Michael Hayden, director of the Central Intelligence Agency (2006–2009)
- William Inboden, senior director for Strategic Planning, National Security Council
- James Jeffrey, Deputy National Security Advisor
- James C. Langdon, Jr., chair of the President's Intelligence Advisory Board
- Deborah Loewer, director of the White House Situation Room (endorsed Hillary Clinton)
- Evan McMullin, operations officer, Central Intelligence Agency; Senior Adviser for National Security, House Foreign Affairs Committee (Independent candidate for President)
- Paul D. Miller, director for Afghanistan, National Security Council
- Meghan O'Sullivan, Deputy National Security Advisor for Iraq and Afghanistan
- Kori Schake, director of Defense Strategy, National Security Council
- Gary Schmitt, executive director of the President's Intelligence Advisory Board
- David Shedd, deputy Director of National Intelligence; acting director of the Defense Intelligence Agency
- Stephen Slick, senior director for Intelligence Programs, National Security Council
- Frances Townsend, Homeland Security Advisor
- Kenneth Wainstein, Homeland Security Advisor

=== Other former federal government officials ===
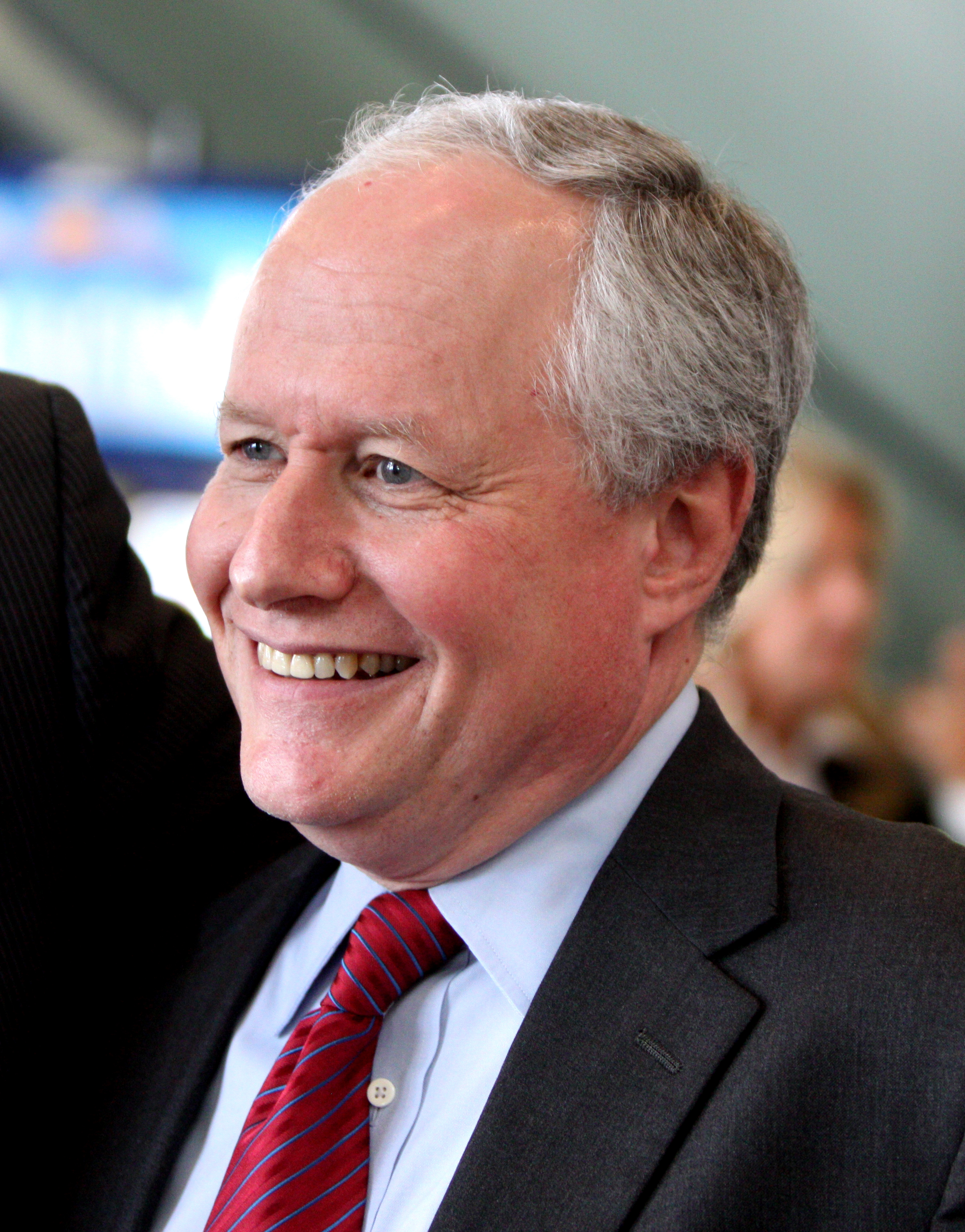
Former Chief of Staff to the Vice President and founder of The Weekly Standard Bill Kristol

- Donald B. Ayer, United States Deputy Attorney General
- Jeffrey Bobeck, former Bush 43 DOE Director of Communications, and 2016 DC Republican delegate
- Phillip D. Brady, White House Staff Secretary; White House Cabinet Secretary (endorsed Hillary Clinton)
- Paul K. Charlton, United States attorney
- Linda Chavez, Director of the Office of Public Liaison; 1986 nominee for U.S. senator from Maryland
- Jim Cicconi, White House Staff Secretary (endorsed Hillary Clinton)
- Scott Evertz, director of the Office of National AIDS Policy (endorsed Hillary Clinton)
- Linda Fisher, former deputy EPA administrator
- Tony Fratto, Deputy White House Press Secretary
- Charles Fried, United States Solicitor General; Associate Justice of the Massachusetts Supreme Judicial Court (endorsed Hillary Clinton)
- David K. Garman, former assistant secretary and Under Secretary of Energy
- Fred T. Goldberg, Jr., Assistant Secretary of the Treasury for Tax Policy; Commissioner of Internal Revenue (endorsed Hillary Clinton)
- Theodore Kassinger, United States Deputy Secretary of Commerce
- Bill Kristol, Chief of Staff to the Vice President and founder of The Weekly Standard (endorsed Evan McMullin)
- Thomas Mallon, Deputy Chairman of the National Endowment for the Humanities
- Rosario Marin, Treasurer of the United States (endorsed Hillary Clinton)
- John McKay, former United States attorney (endorsed Hillary Clinton)
- Andrew Natsios, administrator of the United States Agency for International Development; chair of the Massachusetts Republican Party
- Daniel F. Runde, director of the Global Development Alliance
- Larry D. Thompson, United States Deputy Attorney General
- Dan Webb, former United States attorney (endorsed Hillary Clinton)
- Peter Wehner, director of the Office of Strategic Initiatives
- Lezlee Westine, director of the Office of Public Liaison (endorsed Hillary Clinton)
- Peter Zeidenberg, assistant United States attorney

=== State officials ===
==== Sitting ====
- Brian Calley, lieutenant governor of Michigan (2011–2019)
- Spencer Cox, lieutenant governor of Utah (2013–2021)
- Kim Guadagno, lieutenant governor of New Jersey (2010–2018)
- Karyn Polito, lieutenant governor of Massachusetts (2015–2023)
- Phil Scott, lieutenant governor of Vermont (2011–2017) (wrote in Jim Douglas)

==== Former ====
- Paul Anderson, associate justice of the Minnesota Supreme Court (1994–2013) (endorsed Hillary Clinton)
- Bob Brown, Secretary of State of Montana (2001–2005) (endorsed Hillary Clinton)
- Tom Daxon, Oklahoma State Auditor and Inspector (1979–1983), chair of the Oklahoma Republican Party (2006–2008) (endorsed Gary Johnson)
- Betty Montgomery, Attorney General of Ohio (1995–2003), Ohio State Auditor (2003–2007)
- Sam Reed, Secretary of State of Washington (2000–2012) (endorsed Evan McMullin)
- Mark Shurtleff, Attorney General of Utah (2001–2013) (endorsed Hillary Clinton)
- Robert Smith, associate judge of the New York Court of Appeals (2004–2014) (endorsed Hillary Clinton)
- Michael Steele, lieutenant governor of Maryland (2003–2007) and RNC chair (2009–2011)
- Diana Taylor, New York Superintendent of Banks (2003–2007) (endorsed Hillary Clinton)
- Grant Woods, Attorney General of Arizona (1991–1999) (endorsed Hillary Clinton)

=== State legislators ===
Sitting

- Rocky Chavez, California state representative (2012–2018)
- Jack Ciattarelli, New Jersey state representative (2011–2018)
- Neal Collins, South Carolina state representative (2014–present)
- Kurt Daudt, Minnesota state representative (2011–present), speaker of the Minnesota House of Representatives (2015–2019)
- Jim Durkin, Illinois House Republican leader (1996–2003; 2006–present)
- David Holt, Oklahoma state senator (2010–2018)
- David Johnson, Iowa state senator (2003–2019)
- Mark B. Madsen, Utah state senator (2005–2017) (endorsed Gary Johnson)
- Chad Mayes, California State Assembly Minority Leader (2014–2017)
- Charisse Millett, Alaska state representative (2009–2019), Majority Leader (2015–2016)
- Ross Spano, Florida state representative (2012–2018)
- Joe Sweeney, New Hampshire state representative (2012–present)

Former

- Michael Balboni, New York state senator (1998–2007) (endorsed Hillary Clinton)
- Lois Sherman Hagarty, Pennsylvania state representative (1980–1992)
- Brian Lees, Massachusetts state senator (1989–2007), Minority Leader (1993–2007)
- Jack McGregor, Pennsylvania state senator (1963–1970) (endorsed Hillary Clinton)
- Chris Vance, former member of the Washington House of Representatives from the 31st district, nominee for the U.S. Senate in 2016
- Will Weatherford, Florida state representative (2006–2014), speaker of the Florida House of Representatives (2012–2014)

=== Municipal officials ===
- Joel Giambra, former Erie county executive (endorsed Hillary Clinton)
- Carlos A. Giménez, mayor of Miami-Dade County (endorsed Hillary Clinton)
- Danny Jones, mayor of Charleston, West Virginia (endorsed Gary Johnson)
- Aimee Winder Newton, member of the Salt Lake County Council
- Tomás Regalado, mayor of Miami

== Other public figures ==
=== Staff, advisors, activists, actors, singer-songwriters ===
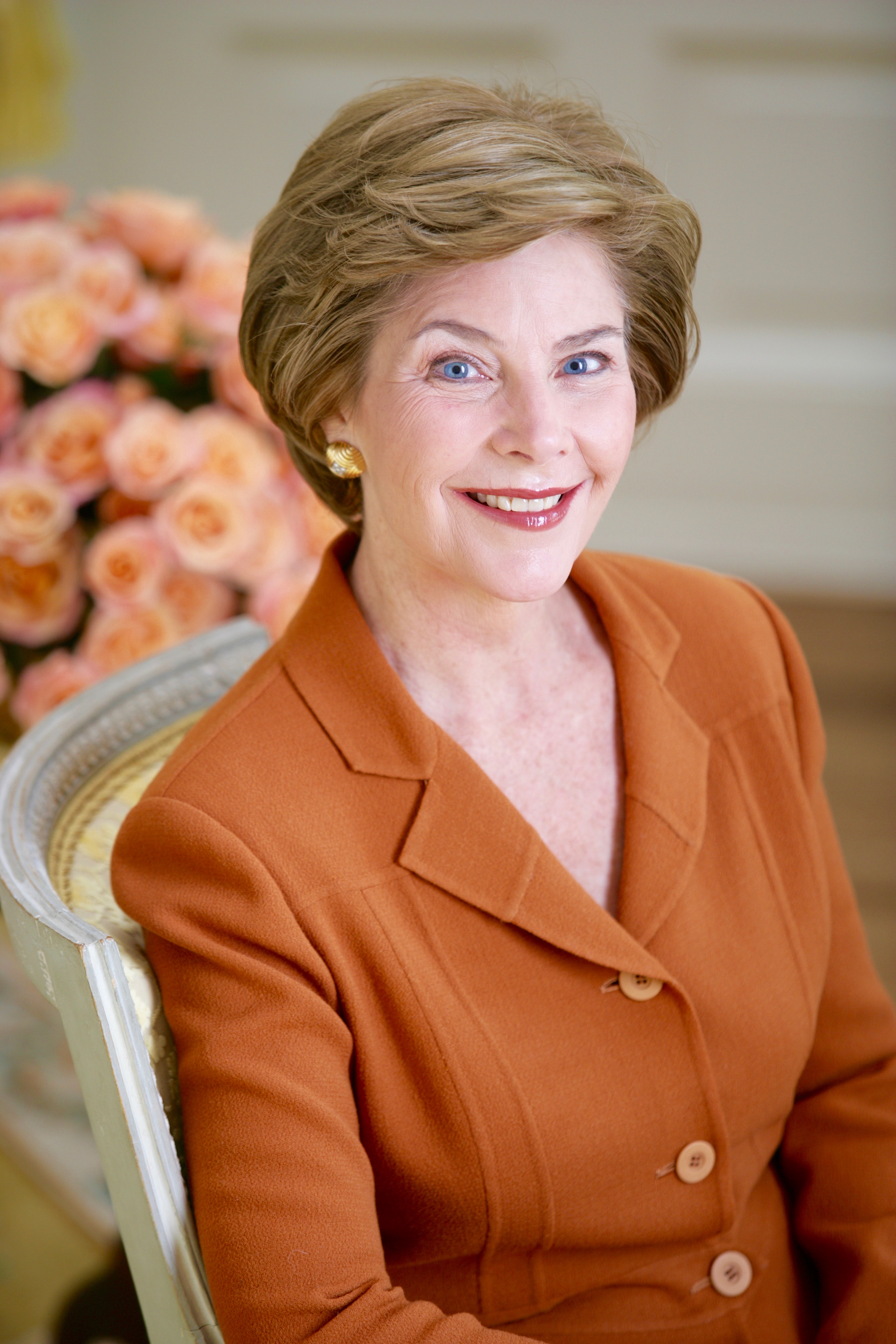
Former First Lady Laura Bush

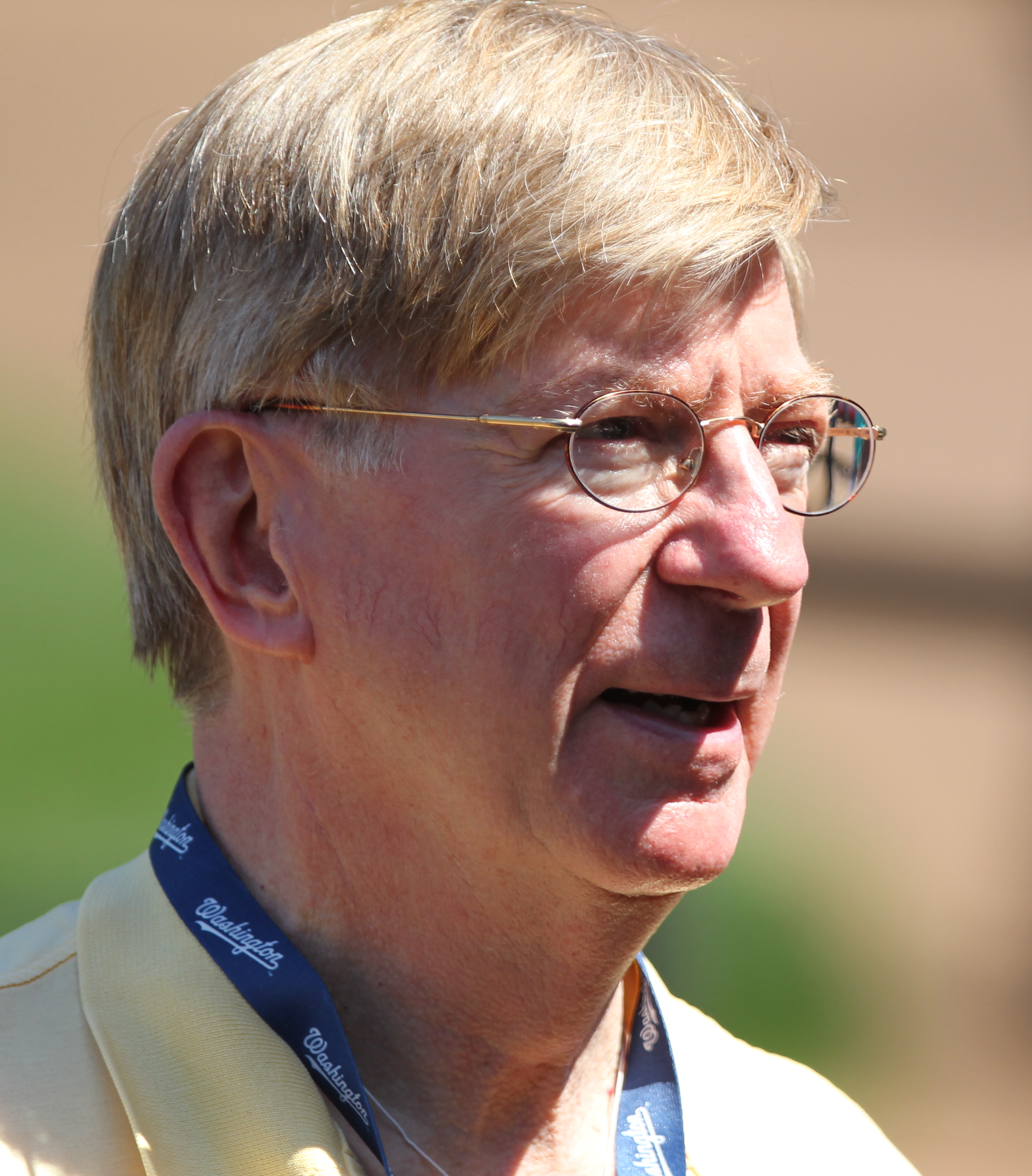
Conservative commentator George Will

- Steve Baer, former president, United Republican Fund of Illinois
- Laura Bush, First Lady of the United States (2001–2009); First Lady of Texas (1995–2000)
- Marvin Bush, son of George H. W. Bush, brother of George W. Bush and Jeb Bush (endorsed Gary Johnson)
- Al Cardenas, former chair of the Republican Party of Florida
- Patrick Chovanec, economist
- Beau Correll, attorney, political activist (led Free The Delegates movement, filed successful federal lawsuit to unbind delegates)
- Alyssa Farah Griffin, Communications Director for the U.S. House of Representatives Freedom Caucus, Congressional intern (wrote in Paul Ryan)
- Five for Fighting, singer-songwriter
- Mindy Finn, political consultant, strategist, and activist (Independent running mate for Evan McMullin)
- Patricia Heaton, actress
- Juan Hernandez, political consultant, co-founder of Hispanic Republicans of Texas (endorsed Gary Johnson)
- Matt Higgins, former press secretary for New York City Mayor Rudy Giuliani (endorsed Hillary Clinton)
- Robert Kagan, former foreign policy advisor and speechwriter (endorsed Hillary Clinton)
- Matt Kibbe, libertarian ideals advocate
- Jimmy LaSalvia, co-founder of GOProud (endorsed Hillary Clinton)
- Sarah Longwell, political advisor
- Kevin Madden, spokesperson for 2012 presidential nominee Mitt Romney
- Ken Mehlman, former chair of the Republican National Committee
- Mike Murphy, political consultant and commentator (indirectly endorsed Hillary Clinton)
- William F. B. O'Reilly, political strategist, conservative columnist
- Patrick Ruffini, political strategist
- Mark Salter, chief aide to John McCain (endorsed Hillary Clinton)
- Randy Scheunemann, national security and foreign policy advisor
- Steve Schmidt, campaign strategist
- Lionel Sosa, political consultant (endorsed Hillary Clinton)
- A. J. Spiker, chair of the Iowa Republican Party
- Stuart Stevens, political consultant and strategist
- Mac Stipanovich, strategist and lobbyist; former Chief of Staff to Bob Martinez (endorsed Hillary Clinton)
- John Weaver, (Note: called on Trump and Pence to withdraw their candidacies) strategist
- Rick Wilson, political consultant and former Republican strategist.

=== Academics, journalists, authors, commentators ===
- Glenn Beck, founder of Blaze Media and nationally syndicated talk radio host (endorsed Evan McMullin)
- Mark Levin, founder of The Conservative Review, Fox News host and nationally syndicated talk radio host
- Michael Auslin, resident scholar and director of Japanese Studies at the American Enterprise Institute
- Guy Benson, journalist
- Michael Berry, radio host
- Max Boot, author (endorsed Hillary Clinton)
- L. Brent Bozell III, activist and writer
- David Brooks, columnist
- Christine Caine, evangelical author
- Steven G. Calabresi, legal scholar and co-founder of the Federalist Society
- Mona Charen, columnist and author
- Joshua Claybourn, attorney, author, and former convention delegate
- Ross Douthat, columnist
- Daniel W. Drezner, professor of international politics at The Fletcher School of Law and Diplomacy at Tufts University, blogger
- Richard Epstein, legal scholar
- Erick Erickson, blogger (endorsed Evan McMullin)
- Niall Ferguson, professor of history
- David A. French, author and journalist
- David Frum, columnist and speechwriter for George W. Bush (voted for Hillary Clinton)
- Jeffrey Gedmin, author
- Robert P. George, academic
- Reuel Marc Gerecht, writer (endorsed Hillary Clinton)
- Michael Gerson, columnist and speechwriter for George W. Bush
- Jonah Goldberg, columnist and author (endorsed Evan McMullin)
- Michael Graham, radio host
- Mary R. Habeck, professor of strategic studies
- David Harsanyi, columnist
- Stephen F. Hayes, columnist
- Quin Hillyer, columnist
- Margaret Hoover, consultant and commentator
- Charles Krauthammer, columnist (wrote in Paul Ryan or Ben Sasse)
- Matt K. Lewis, columnist and commentator
- Dana Loesch, author and commentator
- Peter Mansoor, military historian (endorsed Hillary Clinton)
- Meghan McCain, commentator, daughter of Senator John McCain (voted for Evan McMullin)
- Michael Medved, political commentator, radio host, film critic
- Beth Moore, evangelical author
- Russell D. Moore, evangelical theologian, head of the Southern Baptist Convention's Ethics and Religious Liberty Commission (wrote in Ben Sasse)
- Charles Murray, political scientist and commentator
- Ana Navarro, strategist and commentator (voted for Hillary Clinton)
- Tom Nichols, national security affairs scholar (endorsed Hillary Clinton)
- John Noonan, national security analyst and commentator
- Marvin Olasky, editor-in-chief of World
- P.J. O'Rourke, humorist, author, H.L. Mencken Research Fellow at the Cato Institute (endorsed Hillary Clinton)
- Mackubin Thomas Owens, national security advisor
- Katie Pavlich, journalist
- Daniel Pipes, historian and columnist
- Danielle Pletka, foreign policy writer
- John Podhoretz, writer and columnist
- Dorothy Rabinowitz, journalist (endorsed Hillary Clinton)
- John Shelton Reed, academic and author
- Jennifer Rubin, journalist
- Ben Shapiro, co-founder of The Daily Wire and nationally syndicated talk radio host
- Bret Stephens, journalist (voted for Hillary Clinton)
- Charlie Sykes, author, radio host, MSNBC commentator
- Ray Takeyh, senior fellow at the Council on Foreign Relations
- JD Vance, venture capitalist and author (endorsed Evan McMullin)
- Ruth Wedgwood, professor of international law and diplomacy
- Jamie Weinstein, political journalist
- George Will, columnist
- Montel Williams, talk show host and commentator
- Kevin D. Williamson, writer

=== Business leaders ===
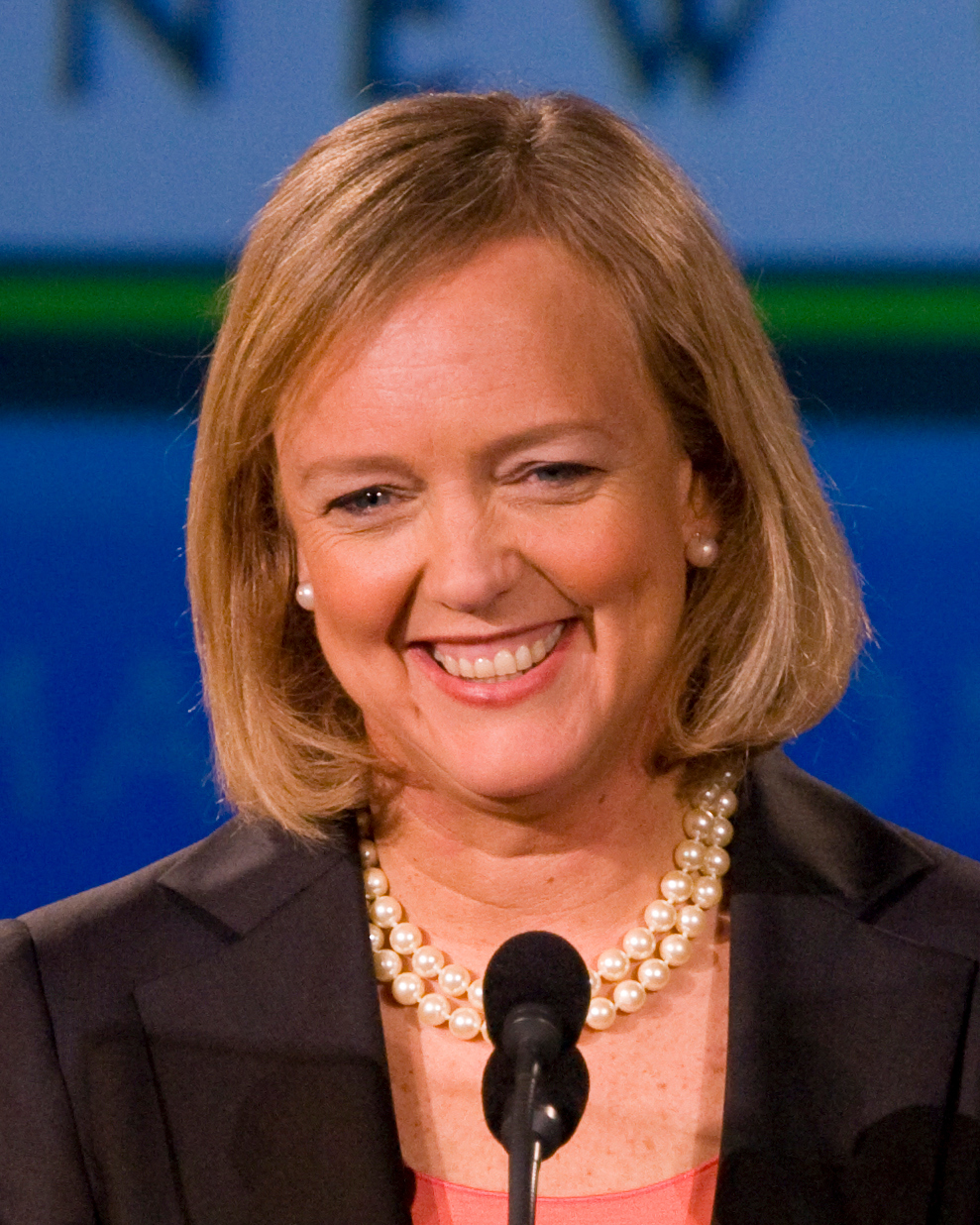
Hewlett Packard Enterprise CEO Meg Whitman

- Daniel Akerson, former chairman and CEO of General Motors (endorsed Hillary Clinton)
- Marc Andreessen, co-founder of Netscape; founder of Andreessen Horowitz (endorsed Hillary Clinton)
- Mike Fernandez, founder of MBF Healthcare Partners (endorsed Hillary Clinton)
- Seth Klarman, founder of Baupost Group (endorsed Hillary Clinton)
- Hamid R. Moghadam, CEO of Prologis (endorsed Hillary Clinton)
- James Murren, chairman and CEO of MGM Resorts International (endorsed Hillary Clinton)
- William Oberndorf, chairman of Oberndorf Enterprises (endorsed Hillary Clinton)
- Chuck Robbins, CEO of Cisco Systems (endorsed Hillary Clinton)
- Paul Singer, founder and CEO of Elliott Management Corporation
- Harry E. Sloan, former CEO of Metro-Goldwyn-Mayer (endorsed Hillary Clinton)
- Jack Welch, former CEO of General Electric
- Meg Whitman, CEO of Hewlett Packard Enterprise; former CEO of eBay; 2010 California nominee for governor of California (endorsed Hillary Clinton)

== Republican groups ==
- Amherst College Republicans
- Brown University Republicans
- Cornell Republicans (endorsed Gary Johnson)
- Harvard Republican Club
- Ithaca College Republicans
- Kenyon Republicans
- Log Cabin Republicans
- New Mexico College Republicans (endorsed Gary Johnson)
- Penn State College Republicans
- Princeton University Republicans
- Rice University College Republicans
- Texas A&M University College Republicans
- University of Houston College Republicans
- The University of the South College Republicans
- UVA College Republicans

== Demographics ==
Research on the Never Trump movement shows that Mormon and female Republicans were the most likely groups to oppose Trump's candidacy while non-Mormon and male Republicans were the most supportive. In the same study, establishment Republicans were found to be more likely to support Trump's candidacy, the opposite of what most observers, including Donald Trump himself, claimed.

== See also ==
- Newspaper endorsements in the United States presidential election, 2016
- Protests against Donald Trump
- Republican and conservative support for Barack Obama in 2008
- Republican In Name Only
- Stop Trump movement
- List of Democrats who opposed the Hillary Clinton 2016 presidential campaign
- List of former Trump administration officials who endorsed Joe Biden
- List of Republicans who opposed the Donald Trump 2020 presidential campaign
- List of Republicans who opposed the Donald Trump 2024 presidential campaign
- List of Donald Trump 2016 presidential campaign endorsements
- List of Evan McMullin 2016 presidential campaign endorsements
- List of Gary Johnson 2016 presidential campaign endorsements
- List of Hillary Clinton 2016 presidential campaign non-political endorsements
- List of Hillary Clinton 2016 presidential campaign political endorsements
- List of Jill Stein 2016 presidential campaign endorsements
