= IEB =

IEB may refer to:

- Independent Examinations Board, a South African independent assessment agency
- Institution of Engineers, Bangladesh, the national professional organisation of engineers in Bangladesh
- Instituto Estudios Bursátiles, a Spanish higher education institution
- International Economics Bulletin, a bi-monthly publication published by the Carnegie Endowment for International Peace
