= Division of Economics and History of the Carnegie Endowment for International Peace =

The Division of Economics and History of the Carnegie Endowment for International Peace (founded 1910) was a part of the Carnegie Endowment for International Peace responsible for the scientific study of the effects of war upon modern life. The initial programme drawn up at a conference of economists held at Bern in 1911. Following the outbreak of the First World War this programme was no longer deemed useful and the director initiated a proposal for an "Economic and Social History of the World War".

== Books published ==
=== 1921 ===
- Allied shipping control: an experiment in international administration Arthur Salter, Oxford:Clarendon Press
