= Carnegie Endowment for International Peace =

American international affairs think tank

Coordinates: 38.909273°N 77.041043°W

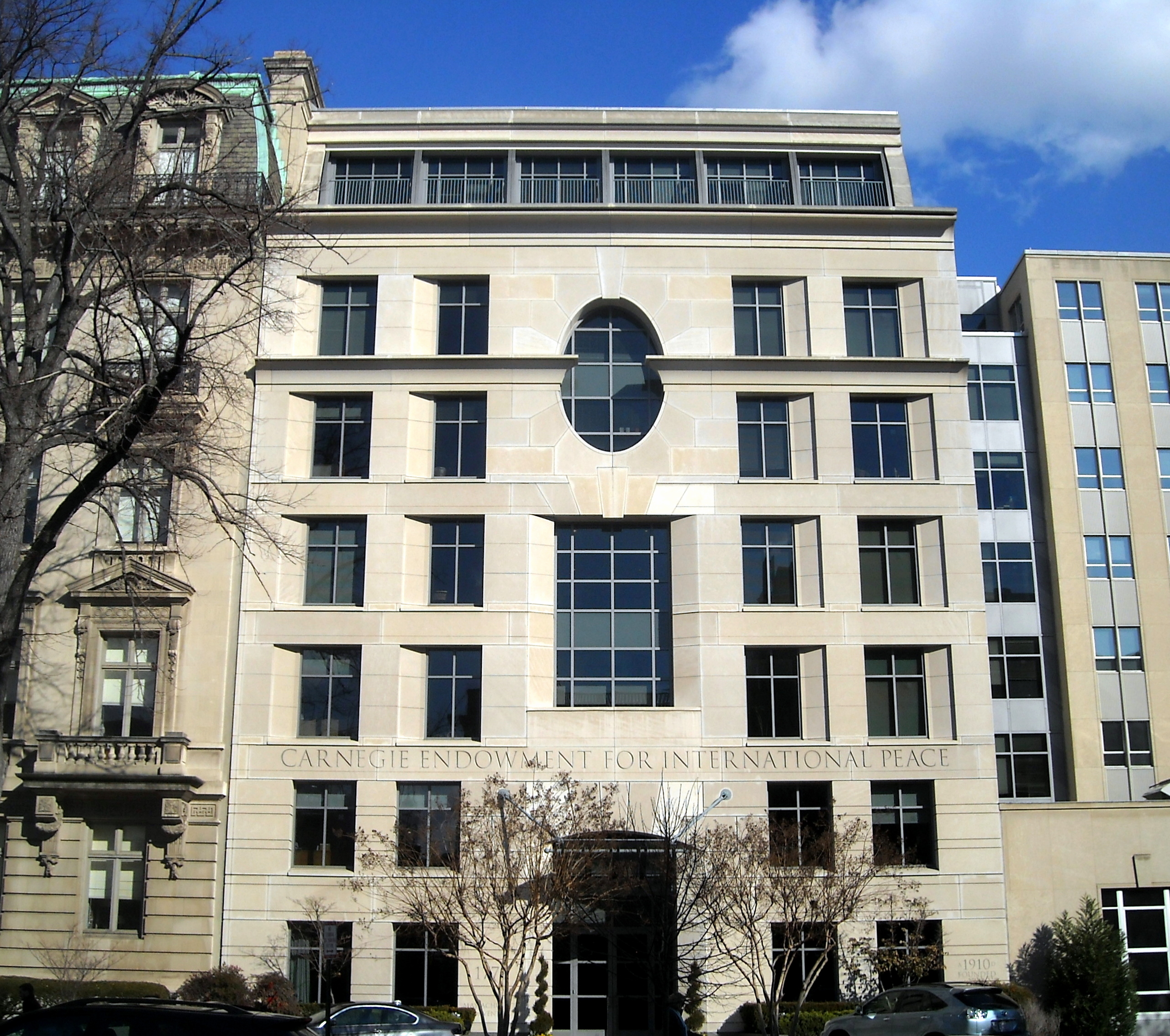
- The Endowment's headquarters in Washington, D.C.
- Abbreviation: CEIP
- Formation: December 14, 1910; 115 years ago
- Founder: Andrew Carnegie
- Type: Foundation
- Legal status: Nonprofit organization
- Headquarters: 1779 Massachusetts Avenue NW, Washington, D.C., United States
- Location(s): Washington, D.C., Beirut, Brussels, Singapore, and New Delhi
- Region served: Global
- Methods: Nonpartisan policy research and analysis, briefing policymakers to disseminate independent analysis and policy ideas, support for unofficial and semi-official diplomacy through backchannel dialogues, training and mentoring fellows, incubating initiatives that become independent organizations, public events, development and distribution of digital content
- Fields: International relations, peace and conflict studies, government and institutions, technology and international affairs, regional political economy, climate and energy
- President: Avril Haines
- Chair of the Board of Trustees: Jane Hartley
- Revenue: $49,714,310 (2025)
- Expenses: $53,686,857 (2025)
- Website: carnegieendowment.org

The Carnegie Endowment for International Peace (CEIP) is a nonpartisan international affairs think tank headquartered in Washington, D.C., with operations in Europe, South Asia, East Asia, and the Middle East, as well as the United States. Founded in 1910 by Andrew Carnegie, the organization describes itself as being dedicated to advancing cooperation between countries, reducing global conflict, and promoting active international engagement between the United States and countries around the world. It engages leaders from multiple sectors and across the political spectrum, and has built a network of 170 scholars in Asia, the Middle East, Europe, India, and the United States.

In the University of Pennsylvania's "2019 Global Go To Think Tanks Report", Carnegie was ranked the number 1 top think tank in the world. In the 2015 Global Go To Think Tanks Report, Carnegie was ranked the third most influential think tank in the world, after the Brookings Institution and Chatham House. It was ranked as the top Independent Think Tank in 2018.

Its headquarters building, prominently located on the Embassy Row section of Massachusetts Avenue, was completed in 1989 on a design by architecture firm Smith, Hinchman & Grylls.

The chairperson of Carnegie's board of trustees is Jane D. Hartley, who was ambassador to the UK from 2022 to 2025. Carnegie's president is Avril Haines who served as the director of national intelligence in the Biden administration. Haines's predecessor was former California Supreme Court justice Mariano-Florentino Cuéllar.

== History ==
=== Establishment ===
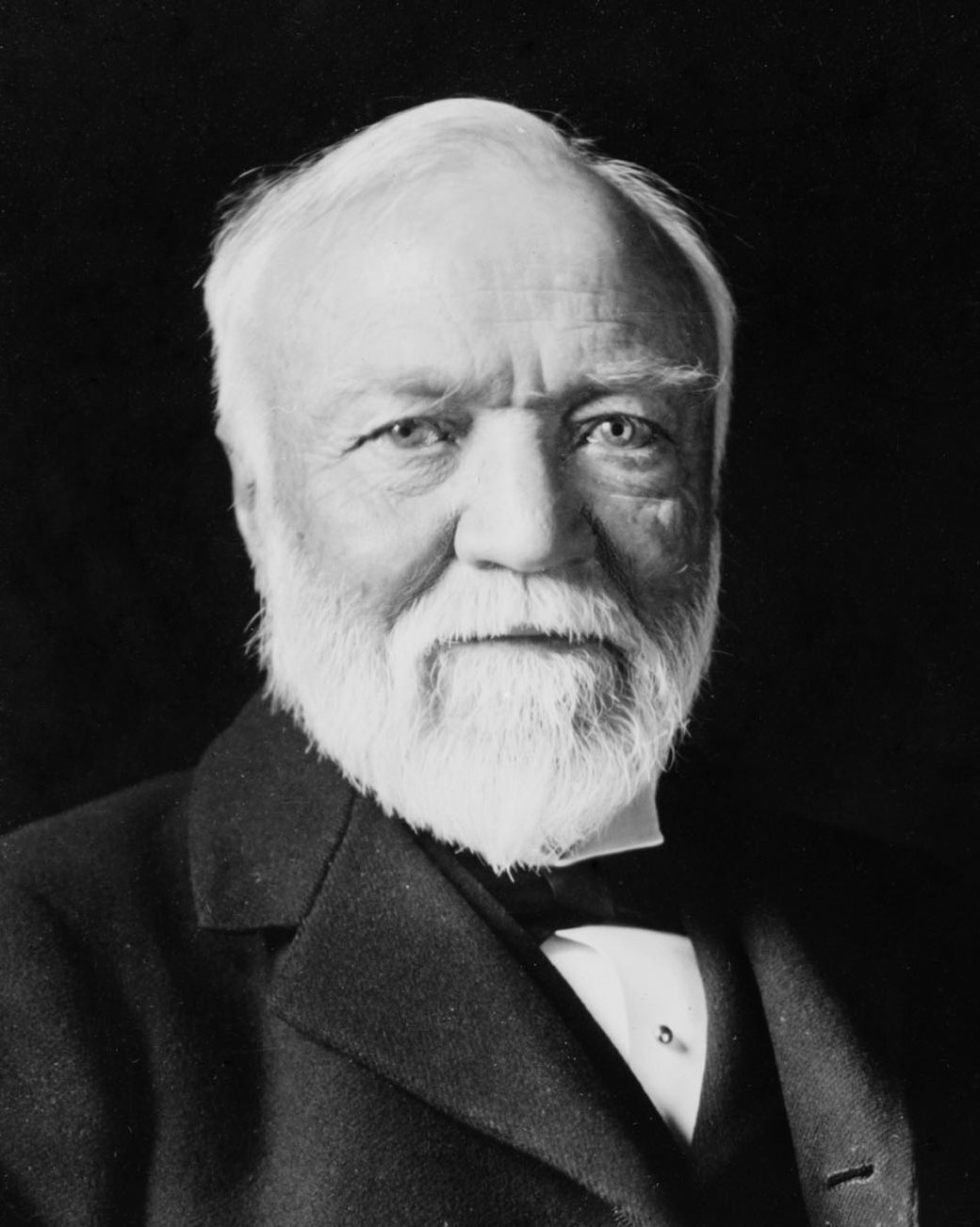
Industrialist and philanthropist Andrew Carnegie in 1913

Andrew Carnegie, like other leading internationalists of his day, believed that war could be eliminated by stronger international laws and organizations. "I am drawn more to this cause than to any," he wrote in 1907. Carnegie's single largest commitment in this field was his creation of the Carnegie Endowment for International Peace.

On his seventy-fifth birthday, November 25, 1910, Andrew Carnegie announced the establishment of the Endowment with a gift of $10 million worth of first mortgage bonds, paying a 5% rate of interest. The interest income generated from these bonds was to be used to fund a new think tank dedicated to advancing the cause of world peace. In his deed of gift, presented in Washington on December 14, 1910, Carnegie charged trustees to use the fund to "hasten the abolition of international war, the foulest blot upon our civilization", and he gave his trustees "the widest discretion as to the measures and policy they shall from time to time adopt" in carrying out the purpose of the fund.

Carnegie chose longtime adviser Elihu Root, senator from New York and former Secretary of War and of State, to be the Endowment's first president. Awarded the Nobel Peace Prize in 1912, Root served until 1925. Founder trustees included Harvard University president Charles William Eliot, philanthropist Robert S. Brookings, former US Ambassador to Great Britain Joseph Hodges Choate, former secretary of state John W. Foster, and Carnegie Foundation for the Advancement of Teaching president Henry Smith Pritchett.

=== The first fifty years: 1910–1960 ===
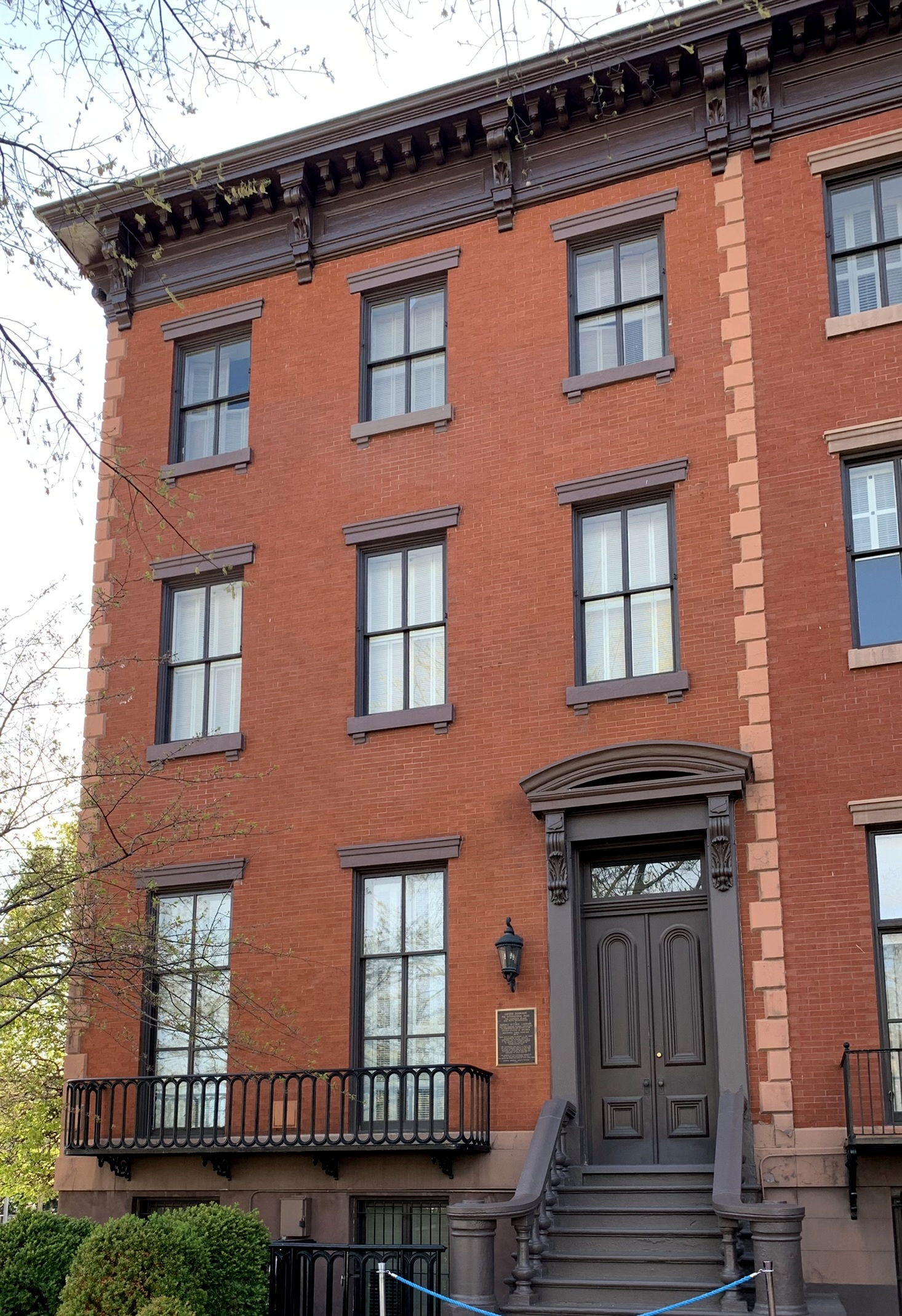
Peter Parker House at 700 Jackson Pl., NW, Washington, D.C., housed CEIP 1910–1947, when it relocated to New York City

At the outset of America's involvement in World War I in 1917, the Carnegie Endowment trustees unanimously declared, "the most effective means of promoting durable international peace is to prosecute the war against the Imperial Government of Germany to final victory for democracy." In December 1918, Carnegie Endowment Secretary James Brown Scott and four other Endowment personnel, including James T. Shotwell, sailed with President Woodrow Wilson on the USS George Washington to join the peace talks in France.

Carnegie is often remembered for having built Carnegie libraries. They were funded by other Carnegie trusts. However, the Endowment built libraries in Belgium, France, and Serbia in three cities which had been badly damaged in the war. In addition, in 1918, the Carnegie Endowment for International Peace (CEIP) began to support library special collections on international issues through its International Mind Alcove program, which aimed to foster a more global perspective among the public in the United States and other countries. The Endowment concluded its support for this program in 1958.

On July 14, 1923, the Hague Academy of International Law, an initiative of the Endowment, was formally opened in the Peace Palace at The Hague. The Peace Palace had been built by the Carnegie Foundation (Netherlands) in 1913 to house the Permanent Court of Arbitration and a library of international law.

In 1925, Nicholas Murray Butler succeeded Elihu Root as president of the Endowment. In December of the same year, the endowment's Board approved a proposal by President Butler to offer aid in modernizing the Vatican Library. From 1926 to 1939, the Carnegie Endowment expended some $200,000 on the endeavor. For his work, including his involvement with the Kellogg–Briand Pact, Butler was awarded the Nobel Peace Prize in 1931.

In November 1944, the Carnegie Endowment published Raphael Lemkin's Axis Rule in Occupied Europe: Laws of Occupation – Analysis of Government – Proposals for Redress. The work was the first to bring the word genocide into the global lexicon. In April 1945, James T. Shotwell, director of the Carnegie Endowment's Division of Economics and History, served as chairman of the semiofficial consultants to the US delegation at the San Francisco conference to draw up the United Nations Charter. As chairman, Shotwell pushed for an amendment to establish a permanent United Nations Commission on Human Rights, which exists to this day.

In December 1945, Butler stepped down after twenty years as president and chairman of the board of trustees. Butler was the last living member of the original board selected by Andrew Carnegie in 1910. John Foster Dulles was elected to succeed Butler as chairman of the board of trustees, where he served until fellow board member Dwight D. Eisenhower was elected president of the US in 1952 and appointed Dulles Secretary of State.

In 1946, Alger Hiss succeeded Butler as president of the Endowment but resigned in 1949 after being denounced as a spy for the Soviet Union by Whittaker Chambers. Hiss was replaced in the interim by James T. Shotwell.

In 1947, the Carnegie Endowment's headquarters were moved closer to the United Nations in New York City, while the Washington office at Peter Parker House (700 Jackson Pl., NW) became a subsidiary branch.

In 1950, the Endowment board of trustees appointed Joseph E. Johnson, a historian and former State Department official, to take the helm.

=== The Cold War years: 1960–1990 ===
In 1963, the Carnegie Endowment reconstituted its International Law Program in order to address several emerging international issues: the increase in significance and impact of international organizations; the technological revolution that facilitated the production of new military weaponry; the spread of Communism; the surge in newly independent states; and the challenges of new forms of economic activity, including global corporations and intergovernmental associations. The program resulted in the New York-based Study Group on the United Nations and the International Organization Study Group at the European center in Geneva. In 1970, Thomas L. Hughes became the sixth president of the Carnegie Endowment. Hughes moved the Endowment's headquarters from New York to Washington, D.C., and closed the Endowment's European center in Geneva.

The Carnegie Endowment acquired full ownership of Foreign Policy magazine in the spring of 1978. The Endowment published Foreign Policy for 30 years, moving it from a quarterly academic journal to a bi-monthly glossy covering the nexus of globalization and international policy. The magazine was sold to The Washington Post in 2008.

In 1981, Carnegie Endowment Associate Fred Bergsten co-founded the Institute for International Economics—today known as the Peterson Institute for International Economics.

Citing the growing danger of a nuclear arms race between India and Pakistan, Thomas L. Hughes formed an eighteen-member Task Force on Non-Proliferation and South Asian Security to propose methods for reducing the growing nuclear tensions on the subcontinent. In 1989, two former Carnegie associates, Barry Blechman and Michael Krepon, founded the Henry L. Stimson Center.

=== After the Cold War: 1990–2000 ===
In 1991, Morton Abramowitz was named the seventh president of the Endowment. Abramowitz, previously a State Department official, focused the Endowment's attention on Russia in the post-Soviet era. In this spirit, the Carnegie Endowment opened the Carnegie Moscow Center in 1994 as a home of Russian scholar-commentators.

Jessica Mathews joined the Carnegie Endowment as its eighth president in May 1997. Under her leadership, Carnegie's goal was to become the first multinational/global think tank.

In 2000, Mathews announced the creation of the Migration Policy Institute (MPI) headed by Demetrios Papademetriou which became the first stand-alone think tank concerned with international migration.

Additionally, from 1993 to present, the Endowment publishes books, papers, e-newsletters, and policy briefs each year.

=== The Global Think Tank: 2000 – present ===
As first laid out with the Global Vision in 2007, the Carnegie Endowment aspired to be the first global think tank. During Mathews' tenure as president, the Carnegie Endowment launched the Carnegie Middle East Center in Beirut (2006), Carnegie Europe in Brussels (2007), and the Carnegie-Tsinghua Center at the Tsinghua University in Beijing (2010). Additionally, in partnership with the al-Farabi Kazakh National University, Carnegie established the Al-Farabi Carnegie Program on Central Asia in Kazakhstan in late 2011.

In April 2016, the sixth international Center, Carnegie India, opened in New Delhi.

In February 2015, Mathews stepped down as president after 18 years. William J. Burns, former US Deputy Secretary of State, became Carnegie's ninth president. After Burns' nomination and confirmation as Director of the Central Intelligence Agency, then-California Supreme Court Justice and Stanford professor Mariano-Florentino Cuéllar became President of the Carnegie Endowment on November 1, 2021.

In April 2022, the Carnegie Endowment was compelled to close its Moscow center at the direction of the Russian government.

In April 2023 Russia's Ministry of Justice added the center to the so-called list of "foreign agents", and in July 2024 it designated the organization as "undesirable".

=== The James C. Gaither Junior Fellows Program: 1910 – present ===
The James C. Gaither Junior Fellows Program (formerly known as the Carnegie Junior Fellows Program and later renamed in honor of former Carnegie Board of Trustees Chair James C. Gaither) is a one-year research fellowship hosted by the Carnegie Endowment for International Peace in Washington, D.C.

The endowment offers approximately 12 to 15 full-time, salaried positions annually to graduating seniors and recent graduates who have not yet begun graduate study. Designed for individuals with a strong career interest in international affairs, fellows are selected through a university-endorsement process from a pool of nominees submitted by 400 participating institutions. Once appointed, Junior Fellows serve as full-time research assistants to Carnegie senior scholars across key program areas including nuclear policy, technology and international affairs, democracy and governance, geoeconomics, and regional studies. The Fellows contribute to policy briefs, books, and op-eds, assist with data collection and editing, help prepare congressional testimony, and organize briefings for journalists, government officials, and foreign diplomats.

Notable alumni of the program include high-ranking government officials and diplomats such as former U.S. Ambassador to the UN Samantha Power, Senator Jeff Merkley, former National Economic Council Director Brian Deese, and former Presidential Senior Adviser turned ABC news anchor George Stephanopoulos. Other distinguished former fellows hold prominent leadership roles across foreign policy, finance, philanthropy, and advocacy, including Eurasia Group Managing Director Evan Medeiros, Arctic Institute President Victoria Herrmann, and Ford Foundation Senior Adviser Kavita Ramdas.

=== Officers ===
Presidents

- Elihu Root (1912–1925)
- Nicholas Murray Butler (1925–1945)
- Alger Hiss (1946–1949)
- James T. Shotwell (1949–1950)
- Joseph E. Johnson (1950–1971)
- Thomas L. Hughes (1971–1991)
- Morton I. Abramowitz (1991–1997)
- Jessica Mathews (1997–2015)
- William J. Burns (2015–2021)
- Thomas Carothers (interim) (2021)
- Mariano-Florentino Cuéllar (2021–2026)
- Dan Baer (interim) (2026)
- Avril Haines (2026–present)

Chairpersons

- Elihu Root (1910–1925)
- Nicholas Murray Butler (1925–1945)
- John W. Davis (1946–1947)
- John Foster Dulles (1947–1953)
- Harvey Hollister Bundy (1953–1958)
- Whitney North Seymour (1958–1970)
- Seymour Milton Katz (1970–1978)
- John W. Douglas (1978–1986)
- Charles Zwick (1986–1993)
- Robert Carswell (1993–1999)
- William H. Donaldson (1999–2003)
- James C. Gaither (2003–2009)
- Richard Giordano (2009–2013)
- Harvey V. Fineberg (2013–2018)
- Penny Pritzker (2018–2023)
- Catherine James Paglia (2023–2025)
- Jane Hartley (2025-present)

=== Board of trustees ===
- Jane Hartley, Chair. Former U.S. Ambassador to the United Kingdom and to France.
- Steven A. Denning, Vice Chair. Chairman Emeritus, General Atlantic.
- Ayman Asfari, Executive Chairman, Venterra Group; Co-founder, The Asfari Foundation.
- Jim Balsillie, Founder and Chair, Centre for International Governance Innovation; Co-founder, Institute for New Economic Thinking.
- C. K. Birla, Chairman, CK Birla Group.
- Bill Bradley, Managing director, Allen & Company.
- David Burke, Co-founder, CEO, and managing director, Makena Capital Management.
- Mariano-Florentino "Tino" Cuéllar, President, Carnegie Endowment for International Peace.
- Henri de Castries, Chairman, Institut Montaigne; Chairman, Europe General Atlantic; Vice Chairman, Nestlé.
- Eileen Donahoe, Executive Director, Global Digital Policy Incubator, Stanford University.
- Anne Finucane, Chairman of the Board, Bank of America Europe.
- Patricia House, Vice Chairman of the Board, C3.ai.
- Maha Ibrahim, General Partners, Canaan Partners.
- Walter B. Kielholz, Honorary Chairman, Swiss Re Ltd.
- Boon Hwee Koh, Chairman, Altara Ventures Pte Ltd.
- Susan Liautaud, Susan Liautaud & Associates Ltd.
- Scott D. Malkin, Chairman, Value Retail PLC.
- Adebayo Ogunlesi, Chairman and Managing Partner, Global Infrastructure Partners.
- Kenneth E. Olivier, Past Chairman and CEO, Dodge & Cox.
- Jonathan Oppenheimer, Director, Oppenheimer Generations.
- Catherine James Paglia, Director, Enterprise Asset Management.
- Deven J. Parekh, Managing Director, Insight Partners.
- Victoria Ransom, Founder & CEO, Prisma; Former CEO, Wildfire & Director of Product, Google.
- L. Rafael Reif, President, Massachusetts Institute of Technology
- George Siguler, Founding Partner and Managing Director, Siguler Guff and Company.
- Ratan Tata, Chairman, Tata Trust.
- Rohan S. Weerasinghe, General Counsel, Citigroup Inc.
- Yichen Zhang, Chairman and CEO, CITIC Capital
- Robert Zoellick, Senior Counselor, Brunswick Group.

== Carnegie Global Centers ==
=== Carnegie Endowment Headquarters in Washington, D.C. ===
The Carnegie Endowment office in Washington, D.C., is home to ten programs: Africa; American Statecraft; Asia; Democracy, Conflict, and Governance; Europe; Global Order and Institutions; Middle East; Nuclear Policy; Russia and Eurasia; South Asia; Sustainability, Climate, and Geopolitics; and Technology and International Affairs.

=== Carnegie Moscow Center ===
In 1993, the Endowment launched the Carnegie Moscow Center, with the belief that "in today's world a think tank whose mission is to contribute to global security, stability, and prosperity requires a permanent presence and a multinational outlook at the core of its operations."

The center's stated goals were to embody and promote the concepts of disinterested social science research and the dissemination of its results in post-Soviet Russia and Eurasia; to provide a free and open forum for the discussion and debate of critical national, regional and global issues; and to further cooperation and strengthen relations between Russia and the United States by explaining the interests, objectives and policies of each. From 2006 until December 2008, the center was led by former Deputy Secretary General of NATO, Rose Gottemoeller. The center was headed by Dmitri Trenin until the Russian government ordered its closure in April 2022, shortly after the invasion of Ukraine by Russia in February 2022.

=== Malcolm H. Kerr Carnegie Middle East Center ===
The Carnegie Middle East Center was established in Beirut, Lebanon, in November 2006. The center aims to better inform the process of political change in the Arab Middle East and deepen understanding of the complex economic and security issues that affect it. In October 2020, it was renamed the Malcolm H. Kerr Carnegie Middle East Center in honor of scholar Malcolm H. Kerr. As of 2024, the current director of the center is Maha Yahya.

=== Carnegie Europe ===
Founded in 2007 by Fabrice Pothier, Carnegie Europe is the European center of the Carnegie Endowment for International Peace. From its expanded presence in Brussels, Carnegie Europe combines the work of its research platform with perspectives of Carnegie's centers in Washington, Moscow, Beijing, and Beirut, bringing a global awareness to the European policy community. Through publications, articles, seminars, and private consultations, Carnegie Europe aims to foster new thinking on the international challenges shaping Europe's role in the world.

Carnegie Europe is currently directed by Rosa Balfour.

=== Carnegie-Tsinghua Center for Global Policy ===
The Carnegie-Tsinghua Center for Global Policy was established at Tsinghua University in Beijing in 2010. The center's focuses include China's foreign relations; international economics and trade; climate change and energy; nonproliferation and arms control; and other global and regional security issues such as North Korea, Afghanistan, Pakistan, and Iran.

The current director of the center is Paul Haenle.

=== Carnegie India ===
In April 2016, Carnegie India opened in New Delhi, India. The center's focuses include the political economy of reform in India, foreign and security policy, and the role of innovation and technology in India's internal transformation and international relations. The current director of the center is Rudra Chaudhuri.

=== Carnegie Russia Eurasia Center ===
In April 2023, the Carnegie Russia Eurasia Center opened in Berlin, Germany. The center focuses on major policy challenges across the wider region in the wake of the Russian invasion of Ukraine. It is home to the digital publication Carnegie Politika.

The current director of the center is Alexander Gabuev.

== See also ==
- International Economics Bulletin
- List of peace activists

== Sources and further reading ==
- Adesnik, David, ed. 100 Years of Impact. Essays on the Carnegie Endowment for International Peace ( Carnegie Endowment for International Peace, 2011).
- Berman, Edward H. The Ideology of Philanthropy: The Influence of the Carnegie, Ford, and Rockefeller Foundations on American Foreign Policy (State University of New York Press, 1983).
- Dubin, Martin David. "The Carnegie Endowment for International Peace and the Advocacy of a League of Nations, 1914–1918" Proceedings of the American Philosophical Society 123#6 (1979) pp: 344–368.
- Greco, John Frank. "A foundation for internationalism: the Carnegie Endowment for International Peace, 1931–1941" (PhD dissertation, Syracuse University; ProQuest Dissertations Publishing, 1971. 7123444).
- Lutzker, Michael A. "The Formation of the Carnegie Endowment for International Peace: A Study of the Establishment-Centered Peace Movement, 1910–1914" in Building the Organizational Society: Essays on Associational Activities in Modern America, edited by Jerry Israel, (Free Press, 1972) pp 143–162.
- Parmar, Inderjeet. "The Carnegie Corporation and the mobilisation of opinion in the United States' rise to globalism, 1939–1945." Minerva (1999): 355–378. JSTOR 41827259
- Parmar, Inderjeet. "Engineering Consent: The Carnegie Endowment for International Peace and the Mobilization of American Public Opinion, 1939–1945" Review of International Studies 26#1 (2000): 35–48.
- Patterson, David S. "Andrew Carnegie's quest for world peace." Proceedings of the American Philosophical Society 114.5 (1970): 371–383. JSTOR 985802
- Rietzler, Katharina. "Before the Cultural Cold Wars: American Philanthropy and Cultural Diplomacy in the Interwar Years." Historical Research 84, no. 223 (2011): 148–164.
- Rietzler, Katharina. "Fortunes of a Profession: American Foundations and International Law, 1910–1939." Global Society 28, no. 1 (2014): 8–23.
- Rietzler, Katharina Elisabeth. "American foundations and the 'scientific study' of international relations in Europe, 1910–1940" (PhD Diss University College London, 2009); online
- Wegener, Jens. "Creating an 'International Mind'? The Carnegie Endowment for International Peace in Europe, 1911–1940" (Doctoral dissertation, European University Institute, 2015) online
- Wegener, Jens. 2026. "Financing International Law: The Role of the Carnegie Endowment for International Peace in Building a Profession." in The Cambridge Handbook of the League of Nations and International Law, pp. 303–320. Cambridge University Press,
- Winn, Joseph W. "Nicholas Murray Butler, the Carnegie Endowment for International Peace, and the Search for Reconciliation in Europe, 1919–1933." Peace & Change 31.4 (2006): 555–584.
- Winn, Joseph W. "The Carnegie Endowment for International Peace: Missionaries for cultural internationalism, 1911–1939" (PhD dissertation, University of Kentucky, 2004; ProQuest Dissertations Publishing, 3123823).
