= Paul Haenle =

American policy expert and Asia/China specialist

- Education: Clarkson University (BS), Harvard University (MA)
- Occupations: geopolitical and foreign policy expert
- Employer: JPMorganChase

Paul Thomas Haenle (born April 21, 1966) is a geopolitical and foreign policy expert who is currently serving as head of Asia Pacific Policy and Strategic Competitiveness at JPMorganChase. Previously he was the Maurice R. Greenberg Director’s Chair at the Carnegie Endowment for International Peace.

== Education ==
Haenle holds a BS in Mechanical Engineering from Clarkson University and a MA in Asian studies from Harvard.

== Career ==
He established Carnegie-Tsinghua Center for Global Policy (CTC), the Beijing-based think tank of the Carnegie Endowment for International Peace, at Tsinghua University in 2010. In 2023, he established the Carnegie Endowment’s research center in Singapore called Carnegie China.

In addition to his role at Carnegie, Haenle was also Asia Pacific Region Chair at Teneo and a senior advisor at Rice, Hadley, Gates & Manuel LLC, where he assisted U.S. and foreign businesses with their cross-border business strategy, including the development of key government relationships, crisis management, and public relations. Haenle also served as senior advisor to SAGE Worldwide, a global events and speaker company; the Royal Asiatic Society, Beijing Chapter; and the Young China Watchers, a global platform for facilitating dialogue between international and Chinese young professionals. He was also an adjunct professor at Tsinghua, where he taught undergraduate and graduate-level courses on international relations and foreign policy. In 2018, Haenle was elected to the board of directors of the National Committee on U.S.-China Relations.

Prior to joining Carnegie, Haenle served as the White House China director on the National Security Council under Presidents George W. Bush and Barack Obama. He was also the White House representative to the U.S. negotiating team at the Six-Party Talks from June 2007 to January 2009. During his government service, Haenle served as special assistant to Condoleezza Rice and Stephen Hadley from 2004 to 2007, and in the Pentagon as a China advisor for the chairman of the Joint Chiefs of Staff.

Haenle is an expert on geopolitics, foreign policy, international relations, U.S.-China relations, China’s foreign and defense policy, and North Korea. He hosted for 10 years Carnegie Endowment’s biweekly "China in the World" podcast, which featured a series of conversations with international experts on geopolitics, international relations and China’s foreign policy & relations.

Trained as a China foreign area officer in the U.S. Army, Haenle was twice assigned to the U.S. Embassy in Beijing. He served as a U.S. Army company commander during a two-year tour to the Republic of Korea. Early assignments in the U.S. Army included postings in Germany, Desert Storm, Korea, and Kuwait. He retired from active duty as a lieutenant colonel in October 2009.

Haenle is a participant of the Task Force on U.S.-China Policy convened by Asia Society's Center on US-China Relations.
