= List of Evan McMullin 2016 presidential campaign endorsements =

Evan McMullin, a candidate in the 2016 United States presidential election, received the endorsements of the following notable individuals.

== U.S. state officials ==
=== State executive officials ===
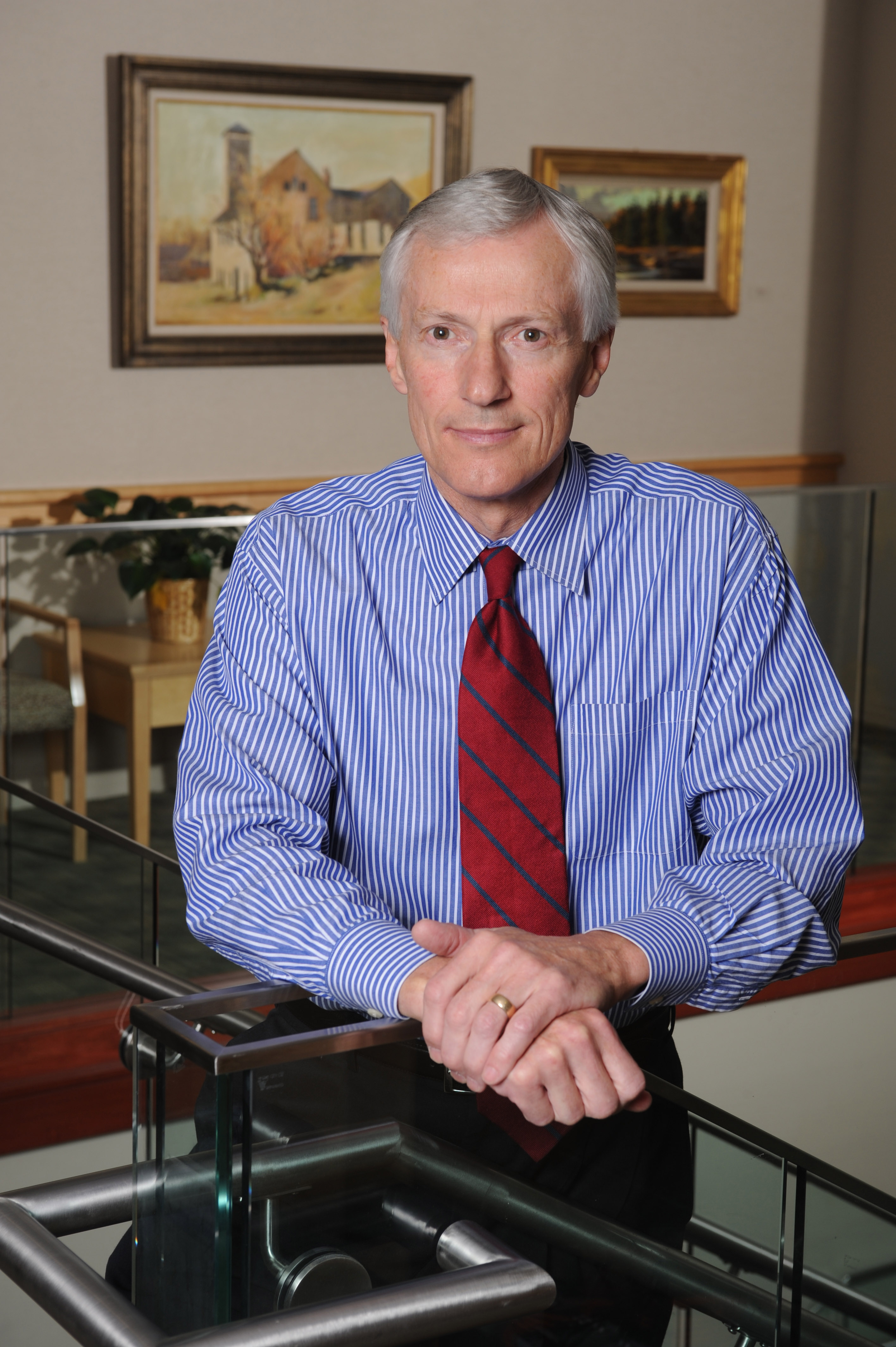
Utah Lieutenant Governor Greg Bell in 2008

- Greg Bell, former lieutenant governor of Utah
- Sam Reed, former Secretary of State of Washington

=== State legislators ===
==== Utah state senators ====
- Lincoln Fillmore
- Howard A. Stephenson
- Daniel Thatcher

==== Utah state representatives ====
- Jake Anderegg
- Fred Cox
- Justin Fawson
- Paul Ray

=== Local officials ===
- Stacy Beck, Spanish Fork, Utah councilwoman
- Richard Brunst, mayor of Orem, Utah
- Kim Jackson, county treasurer of Utah County, Utah
- Rick Moore, mayor of Payson, Utah
- Jon Pike, mayor of St. George, Utah
- Aimee Winder Newton, Salt Lake County, Utah councilwoman

== U.S. Congress ==
- Chris Cannon (R), former U.S. representative from Utah's third congressional district
- Jeff Flake (R), U.S. senator from Arizona
- Slade Gorton (R), former U.S. senator from Washington
- Lindsey Graham (R), U.S. senator from South Carolina
- Mike Lee (R), U.S. senator from Utah

== International political figures ==
- Bart De Wever, leader of the New Flemish Alliance and mayor of Antwerp
- Louise Mensch, former Conservative member of the British House of Commons and editor of Heat Street

== Editors, columnists, writers and media personalities ==
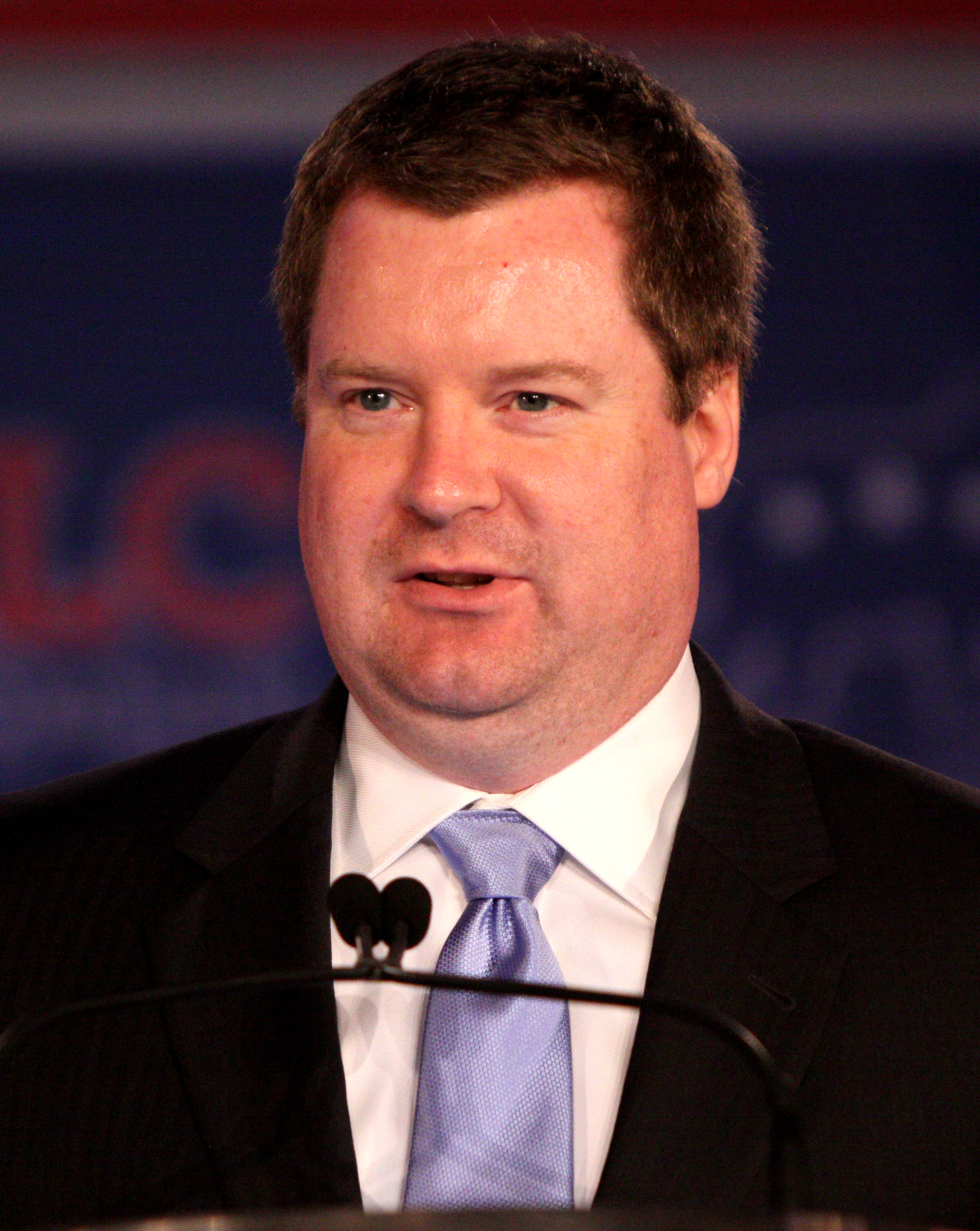
Erick Erickson in 2011

- Audrey Assad, contemporary Christian music artist
- Sho Baraka, Christian hip hop artist
- Orson Scott Card, science fiction novelist
- Mona Charen, columnist, political analyst, and author
- Erick Erickson, The Resurgent, former editor-in-chief of RedState
- Jim Geraghty, National Review contributor
- Jonah Goldberg, National Review columnist
- Sharlene Wells Hawkes, Miss America 1985 and sports announcer
- William Kristol, political analyst and commentator, founder and editor of The Weekly Standard
- Meghan McCain, columnist, author, Fox News Channel host and contributor, and blogger
- Jay Nordlinger, National Review senior editor
- William F. B. O'Reilly, conservative publisher
- Avik Roy, Forbes opinion editor, policy advisor, political strategist, and investment analyst
- Charlie Sykes, radio talk show host
- JD Vance, author of Hillbilly Elegy, future US senator and vice president

== Activists ==
- Kahlil Byrd, founder of Stand Up America PAC
- Natalie Gordon, co-chair of the Davis County, Utah Republican Party

== Political parties and organizations ==
- Better for America
- Florida Independent Party
- Independence Party of Minnesota
- Independence Party of South Carolina

== Newspapers ==
- Charleston Gazette-Mail
- Daily Herald
