= International Economics Bulletin =

The International Economics Bulletin is a bi-monthly publication published by the Carnegie Endowment for International Peace. Edited by Uri Dadush, the publication draws on the expertise of Carnegie's global centers to provide a view of the economic crisis and its political implications.

The Bulletin addresses the challenges of the economic downturn and analyzes the political dimensions of economic reforms in every part of the world.

Because of Carnegie's global centers, they are able to provide this analysis and to establish a forum to address the political, regulatory, and governance challenges of global economic integration.
