= Waterloo (blog post) =

2010 blog post by David Frum

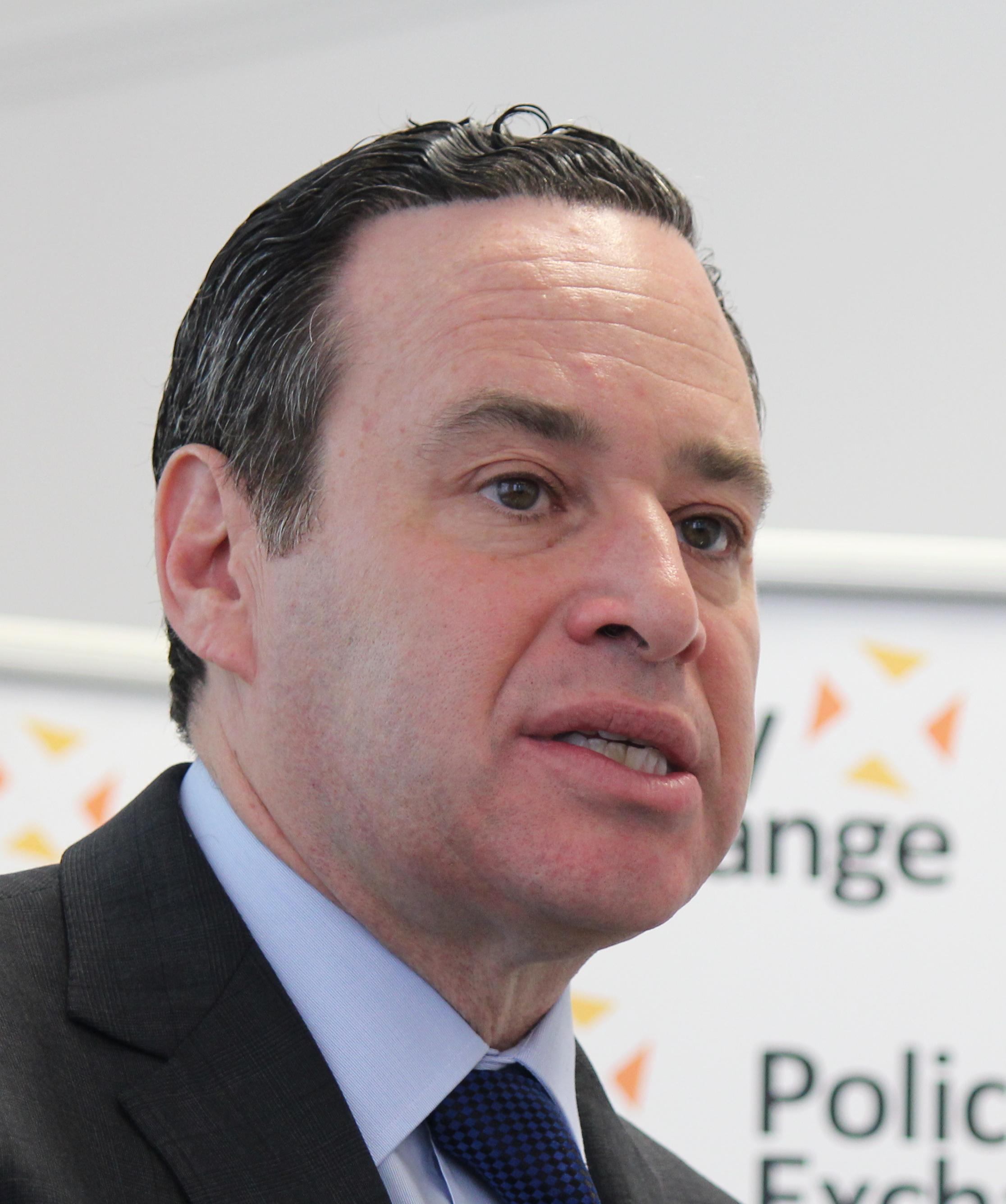
Frum in 2013

"Waterloo" is a post the neoconservative commentator David Frum made to his blog, FrumForum, on March 21, 2010. Earlier in the day the United States House of Representatives had passed the Patient Protection and Affordable Care Act (ACA), clearing the way for President Barack Obama to sign the sweeping health care reform into law. Frum took his title from an earlier prediction by South Carolina Senator James DeMint that the ACA would be a "Waterloo" for Obama and his presidency if Republicans could prevent its passage, much as they had done with Bill Clinton's similar efforts in 1993, which purportedly contributed to the Republicans taking majorities in both houses of Congress in 1994.

Frum called the bill's passage a Waterloo for Republicans, none of whom had voted for the bill or contributed to its passage in any way. But while their anger over that, he conceded, might indeed rally their base to retake Congress once again in that fall's elections, he counseled, the circumstances of the defeat did not augur well for the party's long-term prospects. Despite the ACA's deep unpopularity among Republicans, Frum warned that they would never be able to repeal it since its reforms were more popular with Americans than most Republicans acknowledged. He was specifically critical of talk radio hosts and Fox News for inflaming Republican opposition to the point that party leaders who otherwise wanted to do so were averse to cooperating with Obama and congressional Democrats who had sought the bill, since it was in those outlets' interest for government to remain dysfunctional no matter which party was in charge.

The post became the most-read in FrumForum's history, drawing over a million views and crashing the site's servers. Many of the Republican outlets that had urged non-cooperation with Democrats on the ACA, such as The Wall Street Journal's editorial page, were in turn critical of Frum. Within a week, he was asked to leave his fellowship at the American Enterprise Institute (AEI), an influential neoconservative think tank, over the post. While some of his critics noted that he had barely been present there for the previous three years, Frum maintains his dismissal was in response to the anger he had aroused among American conservatives. Some other critics called Frum's complaints about extremist rhetoric and efforts to enforce ideological orthodoxy among Republicans as hypocritical in light of his own writings earlier in the decade, particularly a 2003 National Review cover story that attacked paleoconservatives, including many by name, as "unpatriotic" for, among other things, their refusal to support the Iraq War.

After winning control of the House that fall, and the Senate in 2014, Republicans passed bills repealing the ACA, which eventually became popularly known as Obamacare, many times, none of which ever had the votes to overcome a veto. In 2017, after the election of Republican Donald Trump, the House passed the American Health Care Act, a bill intended to "repeal and replace" Obamacare, but the Senate never considered it. Almost seven years after his original post, Frum wrote that even though it was "my suicide note in the organized conservative world" he stood firm in his prediction, and urged Republicans to take a more cooperative role in health care reform.

== Background ==
=== Historical politics of the American healthcare reform debate ===
Since the beginning of the 20th century, progressives and later activists from the liberal and leftist side of the political spectrum had sought the establishment of universal health care through a mandatory government-run health insurance system or other programs. While these initiatives had often failed because most Americans who did have such insurance were accustomed to receiving it through their employers, the idea gained more traction with the public during the Great Depression, leading President Franklin D. Roosevelt to propose such a program as part of the New Deal. However, opposition from the American Medical Association (AMA) led to health-related provisions being removed from the Social Security Act prior to its 1935 passage.

Harry Truman, Roosevelt's successor, included plans for universal health coverage in his 1949 Fair Deal program, which again failed in the face of AMA opposition. Shortly afterwards the Internal Revenue Service ruled that employer contributions to health-insurance plans for their employees was a tax-deductible business expense, making those plans the primary means of health care coverage for most American workers in the private sector. Reformers' attention thus turned to groups less likely to have access to that coverage, such as the poor and the elderly; Medicaid and Medicare, created in 1965 as part of the Great Society initiatives of another Democratic president, Lyndon Johnson, met the respective needs of those parts of the population.

Opponents of national health insurance, and later Medicaid and Medicare, had attacked those proposals as "socialized medicine" and, after the onset of the Cold War, begun linking them to communism, arguing that even with limited programs there was not only a slippery slope from the government paying doctors to telling them how to do so, those programs themselves were the leading edge of a greater encroachment on all political freedoms. In the 1960s, those opponents began to include not just physicians but members of a nascent American conservative movement, who believed that government had become too large and intrusive, not just in health care but in all aspects of life.

In 1961 Ronald Reagan, who was elected governor of California five years later, released a recording of a speech he gave against further government involvement in health care, in which he warned that Medicare would be followed by "other federal programs that will invade every area of freedom as we have known it in this country until one day ... we will awake to find that we have socialism." In 1964, Republican presidential candidate Barry Goldwater, who had won his party's nomination with strong support from the conservatives, suggested that once Medicare was in place there would be programs for other benefits. "Having given our pensioners their medical care in kind," he asked, "why not food baskets, why not public housing accommodations, why not vacation resorts, why not a ration of cigarettes for those who smoke and beer for those who drink?"

Bills to introduce universal coverage continued to be introduced in Congress, primarily by Democratic Senator Ted Kennedy, but failed. Republican presidents Richard M. Nixon and Gerald Ford were opposed to all but the most modest expansions of existing programs, and Kennedy and his allies could not reach agreement with their successor, Democrat Jimmy Carter, later in the decade, on a plan even though he supported the idea in principle. Reagan defeated Carter in 1980; while he was not opposed in principle to universal coverage, he believed it should not be provided by national insurance, and Congress did not seriously consider any proposals for it under either his administration or that of his successor George H.W Bush.

In 1992 another Democrat, Bill Clinton, was elected President. He had made securing universal coverage a campaign promise, and shortly after taking office began having his staff put together a bill to that effect. Opposition to the bill arose again from the industry and American conservatives. Their arguments now included not just the cost of the program and the tax increases that might be necessary to fund it, or its impracticability, but a generally libertarian principle that the state should not be involved in providing citizens health care at all. Leonard Peikoff, heir to the estate of influential novelist Ayn Rand, who had promoted a philosophy of maximum individualism through her work, reiterated her argument in a speech to opponents that those unable to afford their own healthcare costs could and should rely on charity or the free market rather than make any claim on the labor of health care professionals through the government.

There were nevertheless some Republicans in Congress who believed the problems with health care were real and that the country would benefit from addressing them. But the neoconservative strategist Bill Kristol counseled Republicans to oppose the Clinton plan without reservation rather than work with the administration, primarily for long-term political reasons. If the plan passed, he warned, "[i]t will revive the reputation of the party that spends and regulates, the Democrats, as the generous protector of middle-class interests," he warned. "And it will at the same time strike a punishing blow against Republican claims to defend the middle class by restraining government." The bill ultimately died without even a committee vote, and Republican opposition to it was cited as a key reason the party retook control of the House in 1994 for the first time in 40 years, as well as the Senate, having made those elections a "referendum on big government".

Opposition to big government and increased entitlement spending on health care did not prevent Republicans from adding a prescription drug benefit to Medicare under the administration of George W. Bush in 2003. But when Democrat Barack Obama succeeded Bush in 2008, on a campaign promise of universal health care, Republicans once again united in opposition when Democrats, who had retaken the majority of both houses in 2006, began working on the Patient Protection and Affordable Care Act (ACA). Arthur C. Brooks, president of the American Enterprise Institute (AEI), a leading neoconservative think tank, cast the effort to block the ACA as a fight for the essence of American capitalism in the face of encroachment by European social democracy.

Obama reached out to moderate Republicans for support, but none of them would reciprocate, fearful of possible primary challenges from the Tea Party, as the populist movement that arose in backlash to Obama's election and in particular the health care reform effort became known. Republicans believed that if they could prevent the passage of the ACA, they could damage the Obama presidency sufficiently enough to not only recapture Congress as they had done during Clinton's first term, but set the stage for a Republican victory in the 2012 election. In July 2009, a few months into the debate on the bill, South Carolina Republican Senator James DeMint said that it would be the new president's "Waterloo" if he failed to deliver and disappointed his base. The party leadership in Congress thus decided to oppose the ACA outright and not offer any amendments or work with the Democratic majority in any way, although some members were willing to do so.

=== David Frum ===
After getting degrees from Yale and Harvard Law School, the Canadian-born Frum became part of the neoconservative movement in the mid-1980s, serving as editor of The Wall Street Journal's editorial pages and later writing a column for Forbes. Typically for a neoconservative, he supporting an activist American foreign policy that confronted certain foreign governments as insufficiently liberal. Frum was not afraid to criticize other factions, as he did in his 1994 memoir Dead Right, where he suggested that right-wing movements should pay less heed to social conservatives and strict supply-side economics advocates.

Frum was particularly repulsed by paleoconservatism, in which he saw strong antisemitic elements, defeatism, and a willingness to go against core tenets of neoconservatism such as governmental restraint in favor of nationalistic or racialistic agendas. In a 1991 article in The American Spectator, he attacked Patrick Buchanan, a former Reagan speechwriter who would later challenge incumbent president George H. W. Bush for the Republican nomination, along these lines. After a stint as a speechwriter in the George W. Bush administration, he wrote another, broader critique of paleoconservatives in National Review, excoriating them for their eagerness to blame American Mideast policy for the September 11, 2001, terrorist attacks and opposition to the Iraq War, as well as the faults he had previously identified.

In 2003, Frum accepted a fellowship at the American Enterprise Institute (AEI), a leading neoconservative think tank, and continued to write for National Review and other neoconservative publications. Four years later, after some disagreements with NR's other writers over the direction American conservatism was taking, he began planning to leave to start a new website to reassert moderate Republicanism, which he hoped could be appealing to younger readers who were "often repelled by today's mainstream conservatism". In 2009 he launched it, first as New Majority, but within a year changed it to FrumForum to avoid confusion with other similarly named organizations.

During 2009, as the House debated the Affordable Care Act, Frum dissented from the blanket opposition of his Republican colleagues in and out of power. He argued that the bill, which included some ideas originally advanced by Republicans as alternatives to the 1993 Clinton plan and then used by Republican Massachusetts governor Mitt Romney for his state's universal coverage plan, offered some hope for Republicans who wanted to control the large increases in spending and taxation that might otherwise result from a plan fashioned purely by liberal Democrats. He also reminded Republicans that Democrats remembered 1993 as well as they did, and had the votes to pass a bill this time and, indeed, would. These efforts, Frum later recalled, increasingly alienated many of his longtime friends in the movement around the Republican Party.

== Post ==
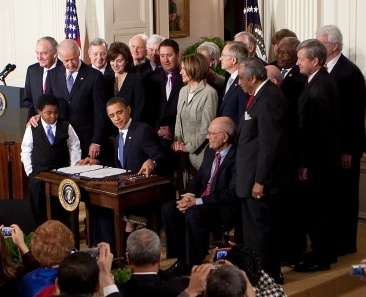
Barack Obama signs the Affordable Care Act into law in March 2010.

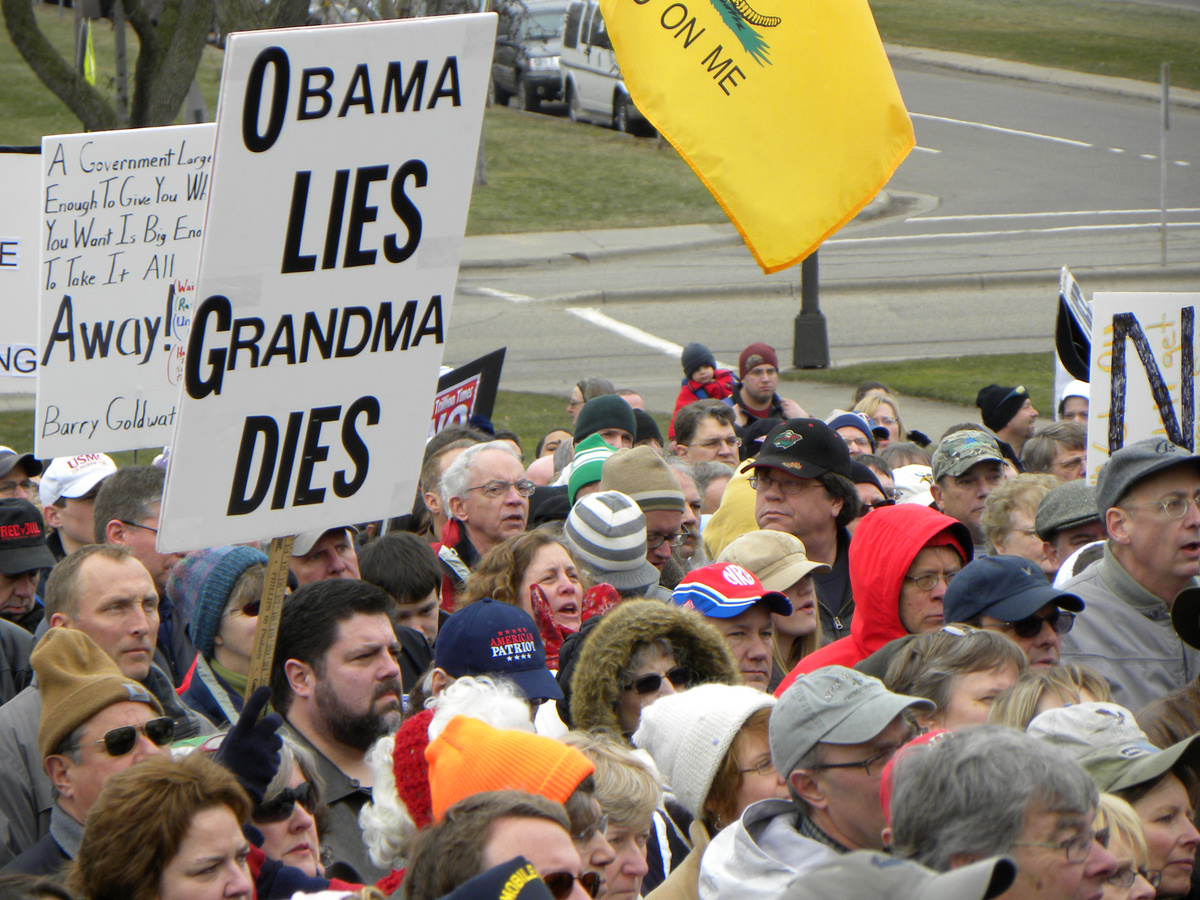
An anti-ACA Tea Party movement rally in Saint Paul, Minnesota in March 2010

On March 21, 2010, the House passed the ACA as amended by the Senate. No Republican in either the House or the Senate had voted for it. The House vote was tantamount to passage, after more than a year of debate and deliberation; Obama would sign it into law two days later.

That evening, Frum posted "Waterloo" to FrumForum. Nine years later he recalled writing the whole post in a half hour, in anger, as a cathartic response to accusations that he had sold out conservative principles He agreed with the general consensus among conservatives that it was their "most crushing legislative defeat since the 1960s." However, while he agreed that it was possible that Republicans could retake their congressional majorities in that year's elections as a result, he was not entirely certain. The economy was slowly improving from the Great Recession that had begun two years earlier, and the benefits of the ACA would be reaching swing voters.

But more problematically, Frum warned, "[t]his healthcare bill is forever." And the fault for that, he continued, was largely Republicans' for refusing to compromise or negotiate. The notion that defeating the ACA would not only restore Republican control of Congress but consign Obama to a single term, he said, overlooked that Obama had been elected with 53% of the vote to Clinton's 42%, and that Democrats remembered the electoral consequences of the 1993 plan's failure. "[Again], we went for all the marbles, [but this time] ended with none."

Given the ACA's debt to ideas that had originated with conservatives, Frum wrote, Republicans could have certainly worked with Democrats to craft the ACA in some directions more amenable to conservatives, particularly given Obama's hope for a plan with bipartisan support. But they had missed their opportunity. The tax increases and Medicaid expansions Republicans had most strongly opposed were now law.

And even as Republicans promised that they would repeal the bill, Frum warned them they would never be able to due to the ACA's many popular features. "We followed the most radical voices in the party and the movement, and they led us to abject and irreversible defeat." Those voices were the talk radio hosts and Fox News panelists who had gotten their listeners and viewers to so fervently oppose the ACA that Republicans in Congress who had wanted to work with Democrats and possibly prevent those provisions from becoming law, had, instead, been too afraid of their supporters' anger to even attempt to do so. "How do you negotiate with somebody ... whom your voters have been persuaded to believe wants to murder their grandmother?" he asked, referring to the supposed "death panels" opponents alleged the bill would provide for, that would decide who could get lifesaving care.

"The real leaders are on TV and radio" Frum charged. He noted how popular Republican talk radio host Rush Limbaugh had said he wanted Obama to fail, which he allowed was honest enough on Limbaugh's part, but accused Limbaugh of wanting the same fate for Republicans, since if they succeeded in governing effectively, the radio host's audience would be happier, and not need to listen to Limbaugh and those like him. The "conservative entertainment industry", had won as the party they professed to support had lost. "For them, it's mission accomplished. For the cause they purport to represent, it's Waterloo all right: ours", Frum concluded.

== Reaction ==
Traffic to FrumForum had previously peaked at around 25,000 unique visitors per day. "Waterloo" drew a million, eventually crashing the servers and making it impossible to view. However, writers at the editorial pages of Frum's former employer, The Wall Street Journal, were able to read it and post within a few hours an editorial accusing him of "peddling bad revisionist history that would have been even worse politics". On the other side, the White House Press Secretary's office tweeted the next morning a link to the post calling it a "very interesting analysis and VERY MUCH worth a read".

=== Dismissal from AEI ===
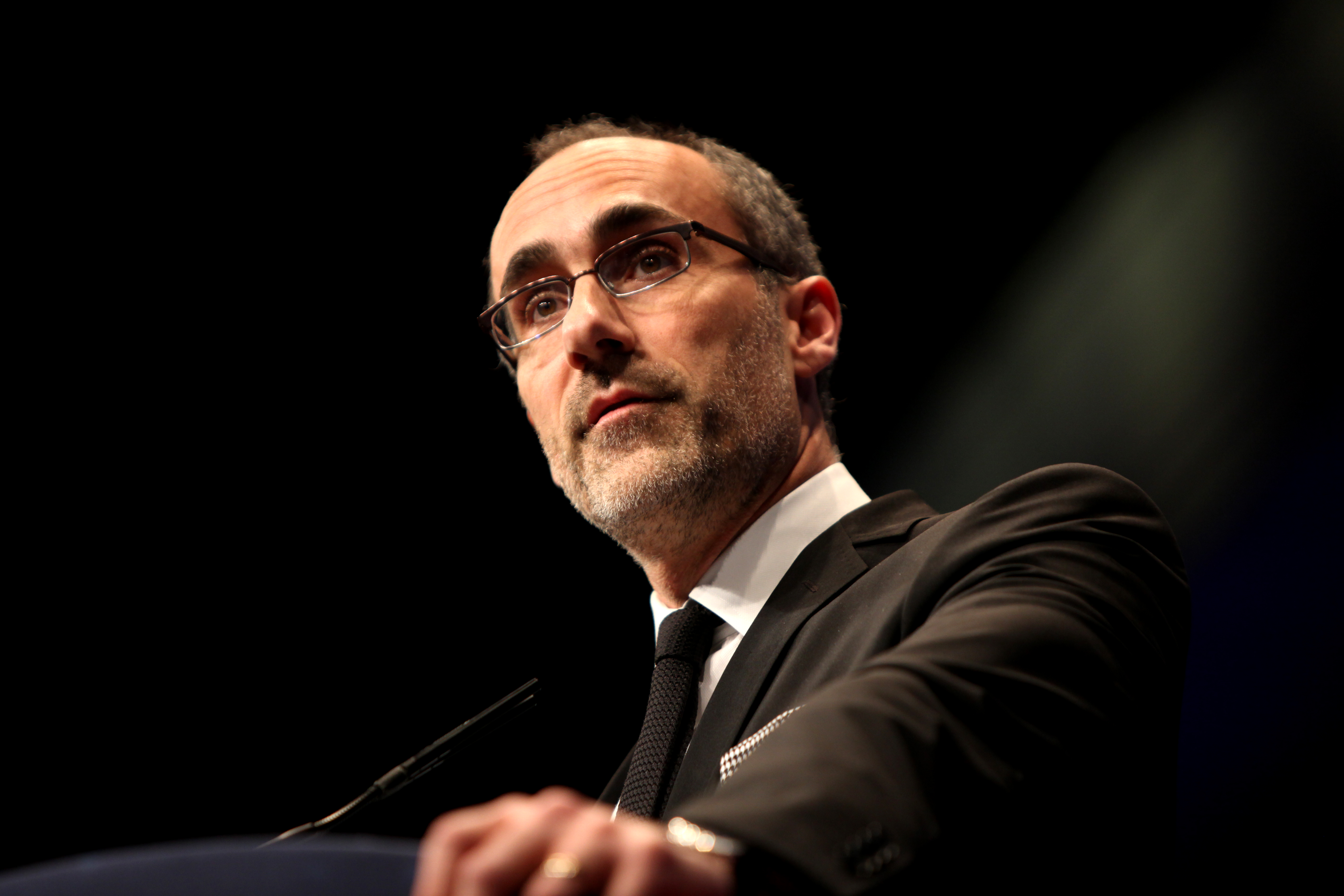
American Enterprise Institute president Arthur C. Brooks, who terminated Frum's $100,000 a year fellowship following the "Waterloo" post

On the next morning, Frum got a call from AEI president Arthur C. Brooks. Frum was told that his fellowship, which paid him $100,000 a year with little responsibility on his part, was being terminated. He was offered the opportunity to stay on as an unpaid fellow, but declined. On the Wednesday following "Waterloo", Frum posted to his blog his letter accepting that his position at AEI had been terminated, implying that the decision had followed his discussion with Brooks.

Frum did not blame Brooks himself for his dismissal, rather pressure from AEI's donors. "I think Arthur took no pleasure in this", he told Politico. "I think he would have avoided it if he possibly could, but he couldn't." He reiterated one of the themes of "Waterloo", that the Republican intelligentsia were in thrall to the passions of its base. "[T]he elite isn't leading anymore. It's trapped."

Bruce Bartlett, a George H.W. Bush administration official who had similarly lost a position at another think tank, the National Center for Policy Analysis (NCPA), after publishing a 2005 book critical of some Bush administration policies, including the expansion of Medicare to prescription drug coverage, supported Frum's contention that pressure had been brought on AEI to conform to an ideological line. He told readers of his blog that Frum had, a few months prior, asked him if he had noticed any AEI scholars making any public comments about the ACA. When he said he had not, Frum speculated that they had been told to remain silent since "they agreed with too much of what Obama was trying to do." Bartlett later clarified that while AEI's blog had published comments on the ACA, none of them were written by anyone at the institute who was known to specialize in health care. In their conversation, Frum had merely noted this, suggested that AEI was "punching below its weight" on the issue, and merely speculated that donor pressure might be leading its experts to remain silent in the debate.

Some other commentators differed with Frum's assessment of the reasons for his departure. They pointed out that even by Frum's own account, he had rarely even come into his office at AEI in three years, letting mail and packages pile up outside its door. Charles Murray, another AEI fellow, wrote on National Review's group blog, The Corner, at what he believed to be the cost of his friendship with Frum, that Frum's account of the events that led to his departure was "beyond self-serving. It is a calumny against an organization that has treated him not just fairly but generously."

Murray called Frum's suggestion that donor pressure influenced AEI's employment decisions "fantasy". Frum had been "invisible" at the think tank for the previous three years, making only three posts to the group blog during that time and not participating in any other activities to further AEI's mission of spreading neoconservative thought. "Being a scholar at a think tank (or any institution) is not just a matter of acknowledging your affiliation in your books and op-eds." He speculated that Frum's departure had more to do with his increasingly tenuous association with AEI than anything Frum had posted on his own blog.

On the liberal website Salon, Gabriel Winant found Frum's story found it unlikely that AEI's donor base was composed of the "small-town, middle-class Republicans" such as those whose representatives in Congress had been most vehemently opposed to the ACA. However, he split the difference. Brooks' offer to Frum to continue at the think tank without pay did support Frum's contention that donors had expressed frustration with having to continue funding his increasing divergence from the Republican movement's steadfast opposition to the administration's healthcare reform efforts.

Other commentators from outside the movement around the Republican Party, and on the mainstream left, were not entirely sympathetic to Frum. The American Conservative, an organ associated with the paleoconservatives whom Frum had denounced in National Review five years earlier, noted the irony of "[Frum] himself, now being purged", as did liberal commentator Matthew Yglesias. Winant too recalled that "Frum and his allies weren't just trying to drum some unsavory types out of the movement. They were also working at making it impossible for a Republican to oppose the party line on the crucial issue of the day."

In The Nation, Eric Alterman made no mention of Frum's 2003 piece. But he noted that Frum "ma[de] ... an extremely inconvenient martyr for liberals" due to his past enthusiastic support and justification for the Iraq War. However, Alterman agreed that his ostracism had come for "stating the obvious: that perhaps GOP leaders had screwed up their healthcare fight because they were listening to the wrong people."

==== Tunku Varadarajan ====
In a lengthy response to "Waterloo" in his blog on The Daily Beast, Tunku Varadarajan, another former Wall Street Journal editorial page editor, sounded many of the same themes as Frum's other Republican critics. "I especially don't want lectures about excessive rhetoric from the man who wrote An End to Evil" he wrote, also citing Frum's 2003 attack on paleoconservatives as the sort of rhetoric he was now critical of. "Passionate 'extremism' is part of any political debate, and the more of it the better." He derided Frum as a "polite-company conservative" who attacked his ideological compatriots to curry favor with Washington liberals; in that context he called Frum's post "paradigmatic".

Varadarajan also disputed many of Frum's assertions that Republicans had mishandled the ACA to their long-term political detriment. He agreed that the bill would probably never be repealed, but countered that the unyielding Republican opposition was vital to maintaining the party's core principles of minimal governmental involvement in the economy and low taxation, especially after the passage of the Medicare prescription drug benefit. Not only would that principled opposition yield future electoral success, Varadarajan noted, it had affected the course of the ACA's passage when Republican Scott Brown unexpectedly won the Massachusetts special election to replace Ted Kennedy after his death, costing Senate Democrats the 60th seat they needed for cloture votes to prevent filibusters and forcing an expedited vote to pass a version of the bill that some of the party's liberals were not completely satisfied with.

==== Responses from Frum and wife ====
Frum responded to Varadarajan two days later on FrumForum, mostly taking issue with the "polite company conservative" characterization of him. He suggested Varadarajan's impression of the Washington insider culture Varadarajan accused Frum of seeking to ingratiate himself with was at odds with reality. That milieu "ceased to exist a generation ago, if it ever existed at all." The idea that a conservative would inherently prefer the company of liberals betrayed an inferiority complex, Frum said.

Varadarajan knew the truth about Washington, Frum wrote, and did not have to appeal to an outsider's imagination "from some Allen Drury novel". From their common experience of the Journal's editorial page, Frum continued, Varadarajan should also have been well aware of which direction the stronger economic and social pressures on aspiring conservative intellectuals came from. He asked Varadarajan if, during his time there, he had been more afraid of:

... offending the membership committee of the Greenwich Lawn Bowling Club? Or ... transgressing the complex internal ideological system of the Journal's editorial page? Which incentivized more: the yearning for an invitation to Felix Rohatyn's house? Or the hope of an endorsement of one's most recent book by Rush Limbaugh?

Frum's wife, Danielle Crittenden, defended her husband in a post to FrumForum. Without going into specifics or naming anyone, she decried the "dishonest slurs on his character and integrity by people who know him, and in some cases have known him for many years—truly ugly suggestions that David is motivated by cynicism or sycophancy, or both." Sounding the same theme as her husband's original post, she admonished Republicans for becoming what they had once deplored: "The thuggish demagoguery of the Limbaughs and Becks is a trait we once derided in the old socialist Left. Well boys, take a look in the mirror. It is us now."

A day after Murray's suggestion that Frum had been fired by AEI for his increasing absence there, Frum posted a response to that as well, calling Murray's post "especially unpleasant". In Frum's account of his meeting with Brooks, the timing of which did not seem to him to be coincidental, the AEI president had denied to him that his vocal dissent from the hardline opposition to the ACA had any relation to his action and felt bad about having to make the decision. But, Frum also said, Brooks told him "donors were becoming much more specific about where they wanted their money to go."

"Was I terminated for under-productivity?" Frum asked. "If you'll believe that, you'll believe anything." He told readers he had, during his time at AEI, written three books, over a thousand newspaper and magazine articles as well as delivering many lectures and writing profusely online. He had also written speeches for politicians, and worked on a presidential campaign, without pay. Frum had also taking a leading role in opposing Harriet Miers' nomination to the Supreme Court. "Does AEI seriously suggest that it fired the man who led the battle that made possible Samuel Alito's confirmation to the Supreme Court because I didn't pick up my snail mail often enough?"

Frum's response to Murray's suggestion that he had been uninvolved in the behind-the-scenes work of AEI offered further proof that politics had been behind his dismissal. At the 2009 AEI World Forum conference, which he had attended, Lynne Cheney took him to task for his increasing criticisms of Limbaugh. He had not been invited to the 2010 event despite, he claimed, getting several distinguished international guests to attend.

Lastly, Frum argued, Murray was being personally hypocritical in some of his statements. He noted that Murray likewise admitted to not being present much at AEI either, due to the long commute from his Burkittsville, Maryland, home. "If that's a firing offense, I'll see him at the soup kitchen." In a later update Frum also called out Murray for taking him to task for his minimal posting to the AEI blog on National Review''s group blog.

== Since 2010 ==
Seven years later, Frum described "Waterloo" as "my suicide note in the organized conservative world." He has, however, said both at the time and two years later that he still considers himself a conservative. While he has not written for, or appeared on, any self-labeled conservative media outlet since then, he has continued to write political commentary, merging FrumForm into The Daily Beast in 2012, and as a regular contributor to The Atlantic since 2014. He has on several occasions revisited "Waterloo".

=== After 2010 election ===
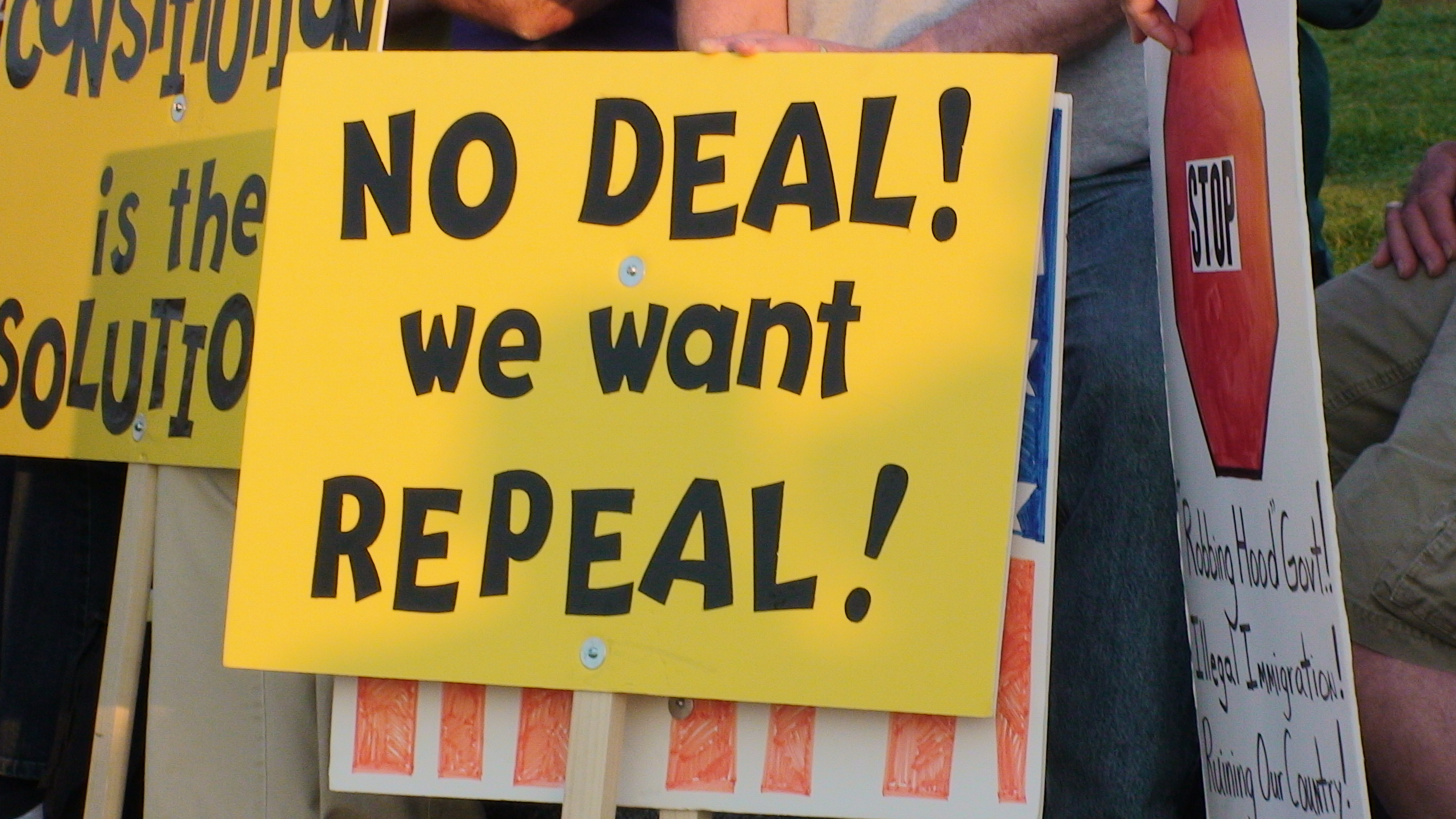
A protest sign opposing the ACA following its passage

In 2010, after Republicans retook control of the House, many celebrated, and some sent Frum emails taunting him with the apparent repudiation of his prediction that March. At CNN, Frum shared his response "Enjoy the moment, fellas. You are only at the beginning of the pain of discovering how right I was."

Frum argued that Republicans, tacitly acknowledging that they would never be able to repeal the ACA, now colloquially known as Obamacare, would instead resort to "a series of stunts", such as repeal votes, refusals to fund the gradual implementation of the law, votes to repeal curbs on future growth of Medicare that they would sell as "cuts" to the program, and hearings publicizing problems with the law's implementation with those adversely affected appearing as witnesses. Focusing on those problems, however, would allow the Democrats and the administration to point out that Republicans could have perhaps averted them by participating in the process, Frum wrote.

"[A]t the end of two years, the law will still be there, more or less intact," Frum predicted. Republican leaders in the Senate understood this, he noted, and were banking their hopes on retaking control of that house as well as the White House in 2012. But Frum doubted they could win enough Senate seats for a repeal vote to overcome a filibuster, and accused Republicans, as he had several months earlier, of caring more about the issue's efficacy in winning votes than actually changing the law.

"As is, we're getting a bad trade: Republicans may gain political benefit, but Democrats get the policy," Frum concluded. "That was my warning in March 2010. This election does not discredit that warning. It confirms the warning."

=== Before 2012 presidential election ===
In late 2011, as the first primaries for the next year's presidential election were approaching, Frum revisited "Waterloo" in a long essay in New York elaborating on his criticisms of the direction the Republican Party had taken. He reiterated his arguments in the original post, telling readers that although the "cadre of sinister billionaires" they might imagine controlling the party did, to some extent, actually exist, they were merely financing the party's move in the direction Fox, talk radio and other American conservative media had long been pushing it in. "In funding the tea-party movement, they are actually acting against their own longer-term interests, for it is the richest who have the most interest in political stability".

Frum doubted that the Supreme Court would rule against Obamacare in a case then pending, as American conservatives at the time had been hoping. "Such a decision would be the most dramatic assertion of judicial power since the thirties, and for that reason alone seems improbable" (Ultimately the Court upheld the program). And without that, any expectation that a Republican House, Senate and president could repeal Obamacare was a "mirage".

After recounting his—and Bartlett's—expulsion from their respective institutions for their ideological apostasy, saying they were not the only ones to whom this had happened, (Note: Five years later, in The Atlantic, Frum said at least six other scholars at conservative think tanks had been forced out for their more conciliatory positions during the same time of the ACA debate. While he named some of the institutions, the NCPA, The Heritage Foundation, and the Cato Institute, where people had been forced out, he did not identify any individuals.) he updated the reader on what had happened since then. While the loss of his AEI position did not affect him too much economically since he had other sources of income, he could not speak for others. "The message sent to [them]...was clear: We don't pay you to think, we pay you to repeat." Even before "Waterloo", he recalled, his vocal criticism of Limbaugh had effectively blacklisted him from Fox, and his volunteer speechwriting for one of that year's Republican presidential candidates had been kept a closely guarded secret within the campaign.

The following June, after telling The Nation that he planned to vote for Mitt Romney in the election, Frum again defended "Waterloo". In a decade, he said, "when every conservative in Washington says the things I said, they will still blame me for saying them. And furthermore, they will always begin saying them with the phrase, 'Look, I have no regard for David Frum. I'm no David Frum.'"

=== After 2016 presidential election ===
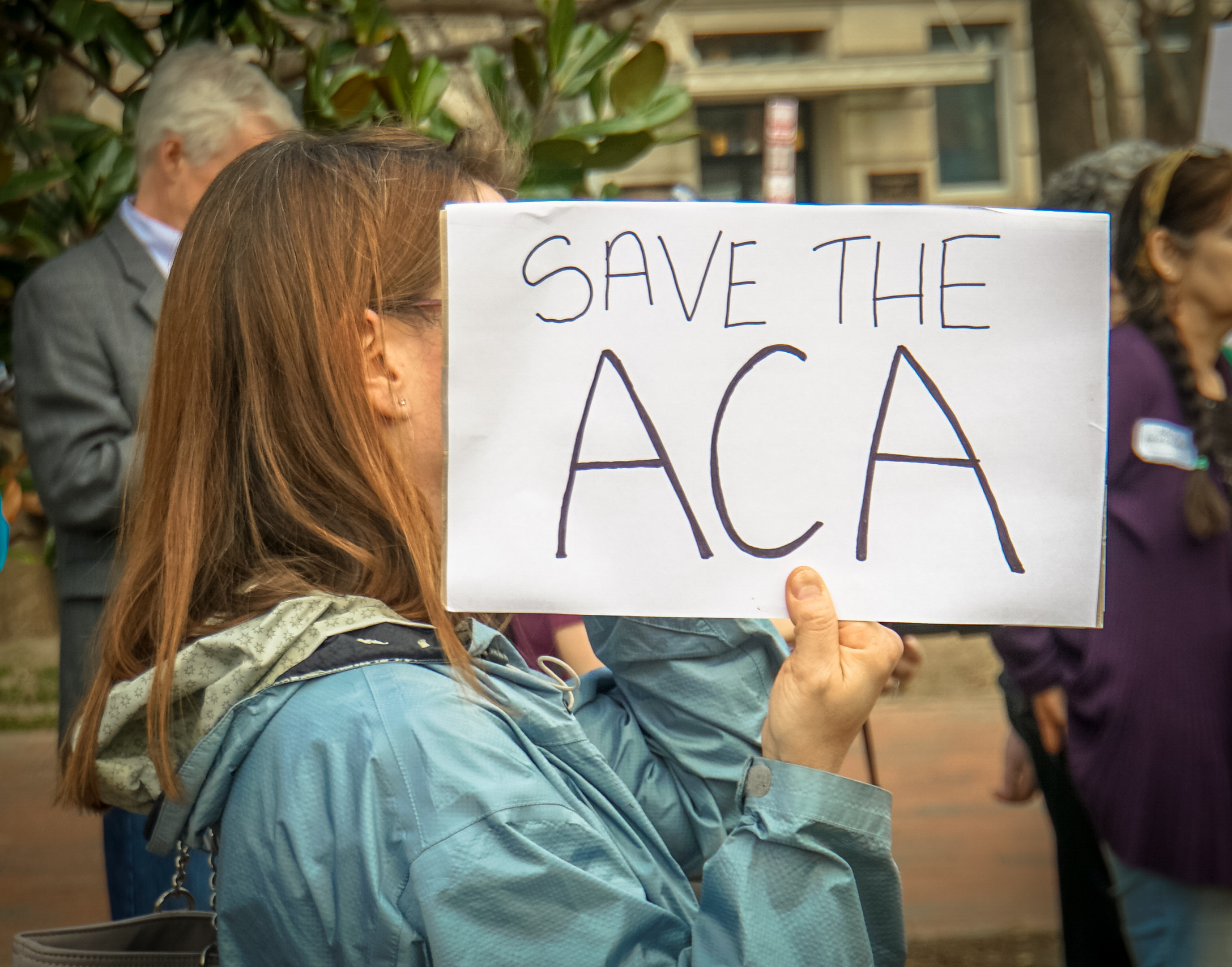
A protester supporting the ACA in Washington, D.C., in February 2017

In 2014, Republicans recaptured the Senate; two years later, Donald Trump won was elected President on the Republican line. For the first time since the ACA had passed, Republicans had the political power to repeal it, legislation Trump had promised to sign while campaigning. But, in March 2017, two months after Trump took office and seven years after "Waterloo", House Republicans' effort to "repeal and replace" Obamacare, the American Health Care Act of 2017 (AHCA) appeared to have foundered (Note: Two months later an amended version passed the House, but the Senate's failure to consider a companion bill led the repeal effort to be considered dead by the end of July, although many Republicans said they remained committed to doing so.) due to a lack of consensus among Republicans as to what form a replacement should take. A month earlier, The Washington Monthly had recalled "Waterloo" and said that Frum was "[t]he one conservative who saw this coming."

Writing in The Atlantic that week, Frum recalled how many times since 2010, as Republicans won more and more elections, he had been asked if he was still sure Obamacare would never be repealed. The failure of the AHCA, he said, vindicated him as many Americans had benefited from Obamacare and Republicans had not offered them any alternatives.

More than that, Frum argued, enough of the American public had come to accept the core principles of Obamacare since its enactment as to put Republicans in the minority of American public opinion on the issue. He again called on Republicans to take a more proactive role in shaping the future of American healthcare. Frum did not go so far as to say healthcare was a right, but called the United States' failure to ensure its citizens adequate coverage "a severe, unjustifiable, and unnecessary human wrong."

Making universal coverage a reality, Frum wrote, would accomplish many things conservatives would be proud of—increasing entrepreneurship as people would be more likely to leave their jobs and start business without the fear of losing their health insurance, improving the life expectancies of the white working-class voters who increasingly made up the Republican base, and reducing employment discrimination against workers more likely to incur higher healthcare costs, such as women and the elderly. Most importantly, Frum concluded, Americans would be less alienated as their country would finally have "joined the rest of the civilized world" in recognizing the importance of providing healthcare to all its citizens.
