= Beaver Creek, Colorado =

Unincorporated community in Colorado, US

- Unincorporated community
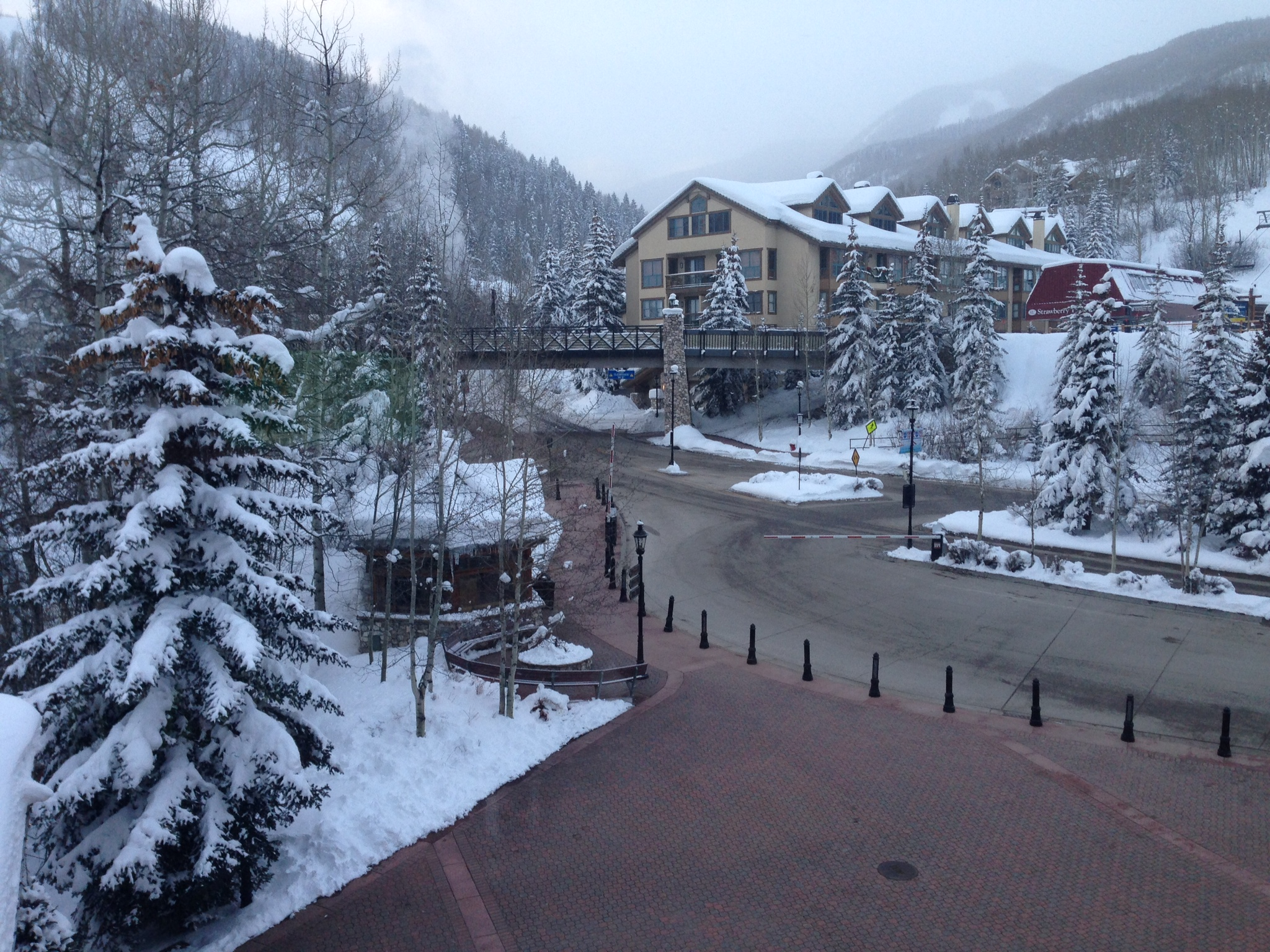
- Snow Mountains on Beaver Creek, Colorado, in February 2014

- Location within the state of Colorado
- Coordinates: 39°36′18″N 106°30′55″W
- Country: United States
- State: Colorado
- County: Eagle County
- Elevation: 8,098 ft (2,468 m)
- Time zone: UTC-7 (MST)
  - Summer (DST): UTC-6 (MDT)
- ZIP Code: 81620
- GNIS feature ID: 2571064

Beaver Creek is an unincorporated community in Eagle County, Colorado, United States. Beaver Creek is located immediately south of the town of Avon and encompasses the Beaver Creek Resort and adjacent business, lodging, golf course, and residential areas. The U.S. Post Office at Avon (ZIP Code 81620) serves Beaver Creek postal addresses.

== History ==
The Beaver Creek area was settled about 1865.

Tucked away in Colorado's Rocky Mountains, Beaver Creek Resort has had a rich history since it first opened to the public in 1980. Located in Eagle County, Beaver Creek is a major ski resort owned and operated by Vail Resorts.

Talks of opening a ski resort in Beaver Creek first arose in 1956, as Earl Eaton and John Burke sought possible ways to enter the ski resort operation business. When Denver won the bid for the 1976 Winter Olympics, Beaver Creek would have hosted the alpine skiing events.

== White River National Forest ==
Beaver Creek ski area operates on National Forest System lands under special use permit to the White River National Forest. The 30-year permit assigns a portion of the bundle of rights associated with land ownership to the permit holder. All lifts, ski trails, and facilities must be approved by the Forest Service in advance prior to construction. Master development plans, construction plans, and summer and winter operating plans are approved by the federal agency prior to each season of operation. Vail Resorts pays a fee to the U.S. Treasury for the use of federal lands amounting to about one dollar per skier. Beaver Creek was originally conceived by Erik Martin, Forest Service Program Manager for Ski Area Administration (1972–2003), White River National Forest, to be a small portion of a larger ski area connected on the east by ski lifts and trails to the Town of Minturn via Meadow Mountain and Grouse Mountain, as well as, Battle Mountain, and Vail ski resort, and on the west to a new entrance portal in Lake Creek. Grouse Mountain was rated excellent for skiing and comparable to Snowmass-at-Aspen by the Forest Service. Skiing connections to Minturn, Battle Mountain, and Vail ski resort was stalled in 1976 due to public opposition.

== 1976 Winter Olympic Games ==
When Colorado sought to host the 1976 Winter Olympics, Beaver Creek development was part of its successful bid in May 1970. The prestigious alpine downhill race, the showcase event of the Winter Olympics, was planned for Beaver Creek by the Denver Olympic Organizing Committee. After state voters handily passed a referendum in 1972 to stop state funding for the Olympics, the 1976 games were reassigned to Innsbruck, Austria, which had hosted in 1964.

== Alpine racing ==
The Birds of Prey downhill course was constructed in 1997 and Beaver Creek resort has regularly hosted World Cup races in early December, primarily in the men's speed events. Vail and Beaver Creek co-hosted the World Championships in 1989, 1999 and again in 2015.

== Grand opening ==
The Beaver Creek Resort opened in 1980 with 425 acres (1.72 km^{2}) of skiable terrain, 4 chairlifts and 28 runs. Although he had originally opposed it, Governor Richard Lamm referred to the ski area during the grand opening ceremonies as the "Tiffany's" of ski resorts. As a legislator in 1972, Dick Lamm was a leader of the opposition to the 1976 Olympics.

As of December 2014, the Resort reported 1,815 acres (7.35 km^{2}) of skiable terrain, 24 lifts, and 150 trails. The late U.S. President Gerald Ford (and wife Betty) owned a home in Beaver Creek. Adventurist Steve Fossett also lived here, and actor Kelsey Grammer (and his ex-wife Camille) had a house in Beaver Creek, and an episode of The Real Housewives of Beverly Hills was shot here.

== Gerald Ford ==
The community is home to the annual AEI World Forum, founded by Ford, and the annual Bravo! Vail Valley Music Festival. Beaver Creek was the host to Gerald Ford hosted annual summits for the retired heads of Europe at Beaver Creek.

== See also ==
- Avon, Colorado
- Beaver Creek Resort
