= World Forum =

World Forum may refer to:

- AEI World Forum, an annual summit sponsored by the American Enterprise Institute
- World Forum (The Hague), a convention center in The Hague
- "World Forum", or "World Forum/Communist Quiz", a sketch by Monty Python first appearing on Monty Python's Flying Circus in 1970
- World Forum for Democracy a annually gathering of the Council of Europe
