= David Frum =

Canadian-American political commentator (born 1960)

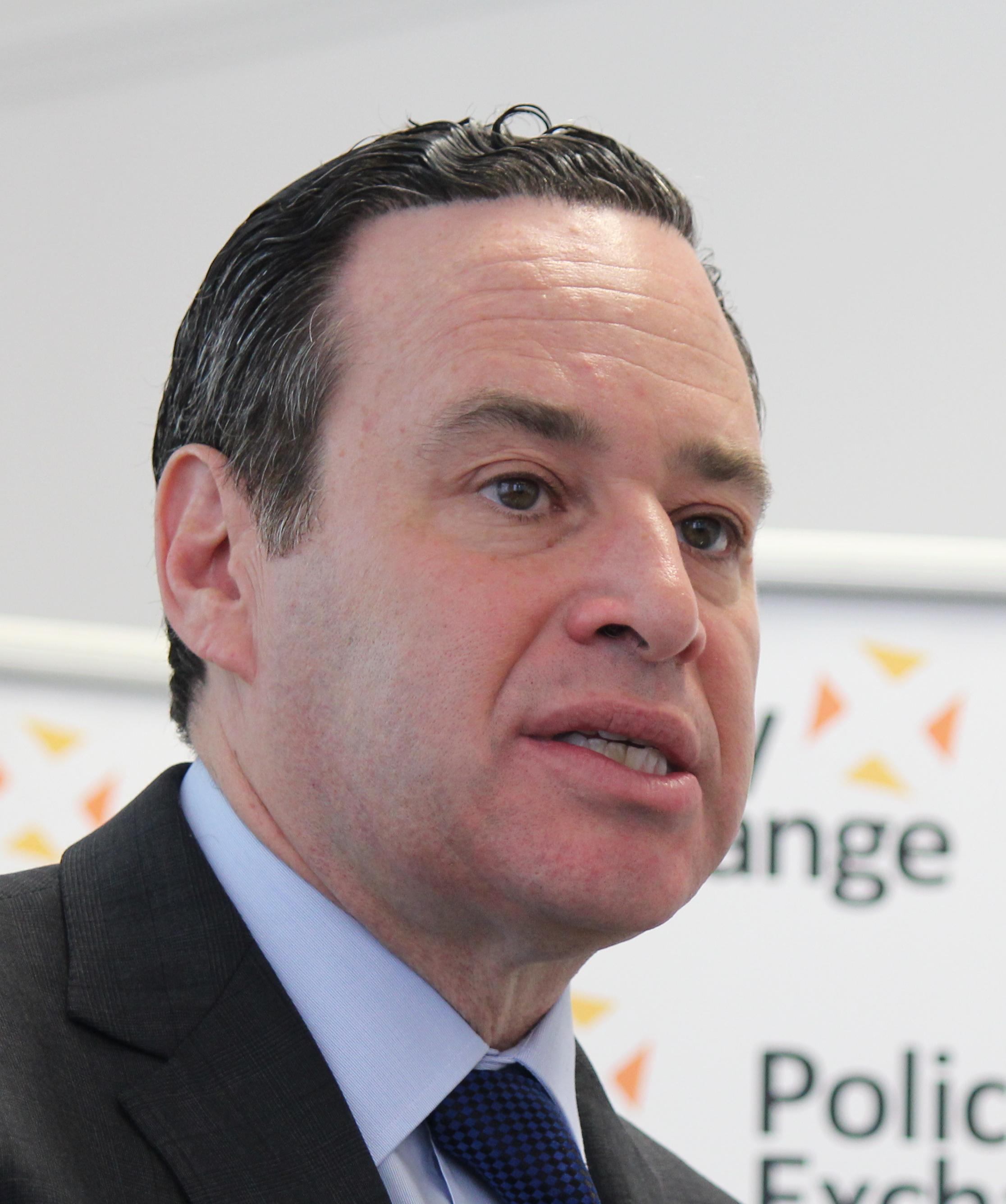
- Frum in 2014
- Born: David Jeffrey Frum; 30 June 1960 (age 66); Toronto, Ontario, Canada
- Citizenship: Canada; United States
- Education: Yale University (BA, MA); Harvard University (JD)
- Occupations: Journalist; author; speechwriter
- Years active: 1987–present
- Known for: Coining the term "axis of evil"
- Political party: Independent
- Other political affiliations: Republican (until 2024)
- Board member of: Republican Jewish Coalition; R Street Institute
- Spouse: Danielle Crittenden (m. 1988)
- Children: 3
- Parent(s): Barbara Frum and Murray Frum
- Relatives: Linda Frum (sister); Howard Sokolowski (brother-in-law)
- Website: FrumForum.com

David Jeffrey Frum (/frʌm/; born 30 June 1960) is a Canadian-American conservative political commentator and a former speechwriter for President George W. Bush. He is a senior editor at The Atlantic.

In 2003 Frum authored the first book about Bush's presidency written by a former member of the administration. He has taken credit for the famous phrase "axis of evil" in Bush's 2002 State of the Union address. He is considered a core voice in the neoconservative movement.

Frum formerly served on the board of directors of the Republican Jewish Coalition, the British think tank Policy Exchange, the anti-drug policy group Smart Approaches to Marijuana, and as vice chairman and an associate fellow of the R Street Institute.

== Early life and education ==
Born in Toronto, Ontario, to a Jewish family, Frum is the son of the late Barbara Frum (née Rosberg), a well-known Niagara Falls, New York-born journalist and broadcaster in Canada, and the late Murray Frum, a dentist who later became a real estate developer, philanthropist, and art collector. His father's parents migrated from Poland to Toronto in 1930. Frum's sister, Linda Frum, was a member of the Senate of Canada. Frum also has an adopted brother, Matthew, from whom he is estranged.

At age 14, Frum was a campaign volunteer for an Ontario New Democratic Party candidate Jan Dukszta for the 1975 provincial election. During the hour-long commute each way to and from the campaign office in western Toronto, he read a paperback edition of Aleksandr Solzhenitsyn's The Gulag Archipelago, which his mother had given to him. "My campaign colleagues jeered at the book—and by the end of the campaign, any lingering interest I might have had in the political left had vanished like yesterday's smoke."

Frum was educated at Yale University, where he took the Directed Studies program.

== Career ==
=== Early career ===
After graduation from Harvard Law School, Frum returned to Toronto as an associate editor of Saturday Night. He was an editorial page editor of The Wall Street Journal from 1989 until 1992, and then a columnist for Forbes magazine in 1992–1994. In 1994–2000, he was a senior fellow at the Manhattan Institute for Policy Research, working as a contributing editor at neoconservative opinion magazine The Weekly Standard, and as a columnist for the Canadian National Post. He worked as a regular contributor for National Public Radio. In 1996, he helped organize the "Winds of Change" in Calgary, Alberta, an early effort to unite the Reform Party of Canada and the Progressive Conservative Party of Canada.

=== White House ===
Following the 2000 U.S. presidential election of George W. Bush, Frum was appointed to a position as a speechwriter within the White House. He would later write that when he was first offered the job by Chief Bush speechwriter Michael Gerson:

I believed I was unsuited to the job he was offering me. I had no connection to the Bush campaign or the Bush family. I had no experience in government and little of political campaigns. I had not written a speech for anyone other than myself. And I had been only a moderately enthusiastic supporter of George W. Bush... I strongly doubted he was the right man for the job.

While still a Canadian citizen, he was one of the few foreign nationals working within the Bush White House. He filed for naturalization and took the oath of citizenship on September 11, 2007. Frum served as special assistant to the president for economic speechwriting from January 2001 to February 2002. Conservative commentator Robert Novak described Frum as an "uncompromising supporter of Israel" and "fervent supporter of Ariel Sharon's policies" during his time in the White House. Frum is credited by his wife with inventing the expression "Axis of Evil," which Bush introduced in his 2002 State of the Union address. During Frum's time at the White House, he was described by commentator Ryan Lizza as being part of a speechwriting brain trust that brought "intellectual heft" and considerable policy influence to the Bush Administration.

Shortly after the September 11 attacks, Frum hosted Ibn Warraq, a pseudonymous Muslim apostate and critic of Islam, at an hour-and-a-half luncheon at the White House.

While serving in the Bush White House and afterward, Frum strongly supported the Iraq War by furthering the claim that Saddam Hussein was in league with the terrorist group Al-Qaeda. In later years, however, he would express regret for that characterization, saying that it owed more to psychological and group identity factors than reasoned judgment:

"It's human nature to assess difficult questions, not on the merits, but on our feelings about the different 'teams' that form around different answers. To cite a painful personal experience: During the decision-making about the Iraq war, I was powerfully swayed by the fact that the proposed invasion of Iraq was supported by those who had been most right about the Cold War, and was most bitterly opposed by those who had been wrongest about the Cold War. Yet in the end, it is not teams that matter. It is the results. As Queen Victoria's first prime minister bitterly quipped after a policy fiasco: 'What wise men had promised has not happened. What the damned fools predicted has actually come to pass.'"

He later acknowledged that it remains unclear how the USA "could have delivered better success in Iraq" in terms of replacing Saddam with a "more humane and peaceful" government.

Frum left the White House in February 2002. Commentator Robert Novak, appearing on CNN, claimed that Frum was dismissed because his wife had emailed friends, saying that her husband had coined the "axis of evil" phrase. Frum and the White House denied Novak's allegation. Frum indicated that one of the most important reasons he left the White House when he did was because, as economic speech writer, he would have had to write speeches defending the imposition of tariffs to protect the domestic steel industry for domestic political reasons.

Frum opposed the nomination of Harriet Miers for the Supreme Court of the United States, because she was insufficiently qualified for the post, as well as insufficiently conservative.

=== American Enterprise Institute ===
Shortly after leaving the White House, Frum took a position as a fellow of the American Enterprise Institute (AEI), a neoconservative think tank. During the early days of his stint there, Richard Perle and he coauthored a neoconservative view of global affairs and an apologia of the 2003 invasion of Iraq entitled, An End to Evil. His position at AEI lasted from 2003 until March 25, 2010, when his paid position was terminated and he declined to accept an offer of a non-paying position. Frum later stated that he was asked to leave AEI because of his vocal criticism of the Republican party's no-holds-barred opposition to Obamacare.

=== Activities after leaving the White House ===
In 2005, Frum faced a libel lawsuit filed by the Canadian chapter of the Council on American–Islamic Relations (CAIR) after he suggested in a column for the National Post that CAIR was sympathetic to terrorists. Frum first vowed to fight the lawsuit, but instead the paper published an editor's note acknowledging that "neither Sheema Khan nor the Council on American-Islamic Relations Canada advocates or promotes terrorism".

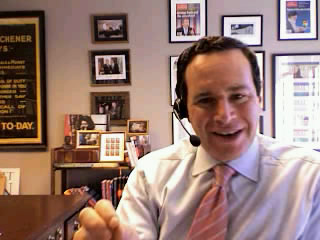
Frum in 2007 on Bloggingheads.tv

On October 11, 2007, Frum announced on his blog that he was joining Rudolph Giuliani's presidential campaign as a senior foreign policy adviser.

Frum was a contributing editor and online blogger for the National Review until November 16, 2008. Frum announced to readers of his blog that he would be starting a new political website, NewMajority.com, describing it as "a group blog, featuring many different voices. Not all of them... conservatives or Republicans." He hoped the site would "create an online community that will be exciting and appealing to younger readers, a generation often repelled by today's mainstream conservatism."

The website was launched on January 19, 2009. On October 31, 2009, its title was changed to FrumForum, to avoid confusion with other political organizations that used "New Majority" in their names. In 2012, the site was merged into The Daily Beast, where his blog continued. Citing personal reasons shortly after the deaths of his father and his father-in-law, Frum suspended his blog on June 3, 2013, but resumed writing for The Daily Beast in September 2013.

Frum joined The Atlantic as a senior editor in March 2014. During the 2014 Israel–Gaza conflict, Frum issued a series of tweets in which he incorrectly characterized a photograph of two blood-covered Palestinian youths bringing their father's body to a hospital in Khan Younis as being "fake". However, the man had been killed by an Israeli airstrike. Frum backtracked from his accusation, and apologized to New York Times photographer Sergey Ponomarev, after extensive debunking by Michael Shaw, but justified his "skepticism", describing other "Pallywood" claims. Frum was criticized by Washington Post media writer Erik Wemple and by fellow correspondent for The Atlantic, James Fallows, who called Frum's tweets "a major journalistic error".

On November 2, 2016, he announced that he had voted for Hillary Clinton for U.S. president. The announcement garnered international coverage.

On November 6, 2024, Frum announced that he had left the Republican Party following Donald Trump's victory in the 2024 U.S. presidential election.

== Books and writing ==
Frum's first book, Dead Right, was released in 1994. It "expressed intense dissatisfaction with supply-siders, evangelicals, and nearly all Republican politicians", according to a negative review by a Frum opponent, Robert Novak. Frank Rich of The New York Times described it as "the smartest book written from the inside about the American conservative movement". William F. Buckley, Jr. found it "the most refreshing ideological experience in a generation". In 2008, Daniel McCarthy of The American Conservative called it "a crisply written indictment of everything its author disliked about conservatism in the early '90s".

He is the author of What's Right (1996) and How We Got Here (2000), which is a history of the 1970s that "framed the 1970s in the shadow of World War II and Vietnam, suggesting, 'The turmoil of the 1970s should be understood... as the rebellion of an unmilitary people against institutions and laws formed by a century of war and the preparation for war.'" Michael Barone of U.S. News & World Report praised How We Got Here, noting that "more than any other book... it shows how we came to be the way we are." John Podhoretz described it as "compulsively readable" and a "commanding amalgam of history, sociology, and polemic."

In January 2003, Frum released The Right Man: The Surprise Presidency of George W. Bush, the first insider account of the Bush presidency. He also discussed how the events of September 11, 2001 redefined the country and the president: "George W. Bush was hardly the obvious man for the job. But by a very strange fate, he turned out to be, of all unlikely things, the right man." In 2004, Frum released his book entitled An End to Evil, co-written with Richard Perle. The book provided a defense of the 2003 invasion of Iraq and advocated regime change in Iran and Syria. It called for a tougher policy toward North Korea, and a tougher USA stance against Saudi Arabia and other Islamic nations to "win the war on terror".

Frum's first novel, Patriots, was published in April 2012. It is a political satire about the election and presidency of a fictional conservative American president.

In 2018, Frum published Trumpocracy: The Corruption of the American Republic, about the dangers posed by the Trump presidency to American democracy. He was interviewed for the book on the New Books Network. In 2020, he published a second volume about the Trump era and its consequences, Trumpocalypse: Restoring American Democracy.

== Appearances on public radio ==
Frum was a commentator for American Public Media's "Marketplace" from 2007 until his final appearance on October 12, 2011. Frum has made numerous appearances on the weekly radio program Left, Right & Center on KCRW, the National Public Radio affiliate in Santa Monica, California. On the KCRW program, Frum presented the conservative viewpoint.

== Political views ==
Frum supported the 2003 invasion of Iraq. He helped write George W. Bush's famous "Axis of Evil" speech to describe the governments of Iraq, Iran and North Korea. Frum is a supporter of Israel. He opposed President Barack Obama's Iran nuclear deal. In 2009, Frum described his political beliefs as follows:

"I'm a conservative Republican, have been all my adult life. I volunteered for the Reagan campaign in 1980. I've attended every Republican convention since 1988. I was president of the Federalist Society chapter at my law school, worked on the editorial page of The Wall Street Journal and wrote speeches for President Bush—not the 'Read My Lips' Bush, the 'Axis of Evil' Bush. I served on the Giuliani campaign in 2008 and voted for John McCain in November. I supported the Iraq War and (although I feel kind of silly about it in retrospect) the impeachment of Bill Clinton. I could go on, but you get the idea."

In 2010, Frum was involved in the formation of the centrist group No Labels as a "founding leader."

In June 2011, following the legalization of same-sex marriage in New York state, Frum's weekly column for CNN was entitled "I was wrong about same-sex marriage." In it he described the evolution of his opinion from being a "strong opponent" 14 years prior; while he had feared that its introduction would cause "the American family [to] become radically more unstable", he now felt that "the case against same-sex marriage has been tested against reality. The case has not passed its test." In 2013, Frum was a signatory to an amicus curiae brief submitted to the Supreme Court in support of same-sex marriage during the Hollingsworth v. Perry case.

In a 2013 opinion column for CNN, Frum discussed the need for a "Plan B On Guns" because of a lack of votes in Congress for gun control legislation. Frum specifically urged the commissioning of a Surgeon General's report on firearms' health effects on individual ownership (writing that "such a report would surely conclude that a gun in the home greatly elevates risks of suicide, lethal accident, and fatal domestic violence"), and he called for Senate hearings regarding the practices of firearms manufacturers. He compared these to hearings conducted in the 1990s about tobacco companies.

In 2014, Frum accused Edward Snowden of collaboration with Vladimir Putin's television networks.

Frum appeared on stage with Steve Bannon, Trump's former campaign CEO and White House Chief Strategist, in the November 2, 2018 edition of the Munk Debates in Toronto, Ontario, where they debated the future of populism in western politics.

In 2018, he wrote, "The advanced democracies have built the freest, most just, and best societies in human history. Those societies demand many improvements, for sure—incremental, practical reforms, with careful attention to unintended consequences. But not revolution. Not the burn-it-all-down fantasies of the new populists."

Frum is a proponent of immigration reform, arguing that "reducing immigration, and selecting immigrants more carefully" would lead to increased economic benefits and restore "the feeling of belonging to one united nation, responsible for the care and flourishing of all its people".

He expressed support for Israel and its right to self-defense during the Gaza war. In December 2023, Frum said that the Israeli response was "inevitable" and that Palestinian statehood was not the solution.

=== Presidential elections ===
Frum supported Republican nominee John McCain in the 2008 U.S. presidential election. In an article for National Review Online, posted days before the 2008 election, Frum gave 10 reasons why he was going to vote for McCain instead of Barack Obama. He had previously been a vocal critic of McCain's choice of Sarah Palin as his running mate, who he criticized as unqualified to assume the presidency. Speaking of Palin's performance during the campaign, Frum stated, "I think she has pretty thoroughly—and probably irretrievably—proven that she is not up to the job of being president of the United States." Nevertheless, he ultimately stated his support for Palin, writing "But on Tuesday, I will trust that she can learn. She has governed a state—and... it says something important that so many millions of people respond to her as somebody who incarnates their beliefs and values. At a time when the great American middle often seems to be falling further and further behind, there may be a special need for a national leader who represents and symbolizes that middle."

After the 2012 election, Frum said that Mitt Romney would have been "a really good president" but had allowed himself to be "twisted into pretzels" by the more extreme factions of the Republican Party who immediately abandoned him after he lost the election.

=== Never Trump ===
Frum stated that he voted for Hillary Clinton in the 2016 U.S. presidential election. He is identified with the Never Trump movement, Republicans who opposed the election of Donald Trump and continued to oppose Trump during his presidency. In October 2019, Frum called Trump "very, very guilty" of attempting to influence Ukraine to announce an investigation into Trump's political opponent Joe Biden. During Trump's first term, Frum wrote two books criticizing Trump, his policies, and his incompetence at governing. One was Trumpocracy: The Corruption of the American Republic (2018), the other was Trumpocalypse: Restoring American Democracy (2020). In April 2022, when the Republican Party prohibited its candidates from participating in future presidential debates, Frum attributed the decision to the "Trump Cinematic Universe", an involuted cartoon version of reality accessible to "only those conversant with the pro-Trump right's internal myths and legends". In April 2024, he wrote an article published in The Atlantic entitled "Trump Deflates", where he argued: "The House vote to aid Ukraine renews hope that Ukraine can still win its war. It also showed how and why Donald Trump should lose the 2024 election."

On his podcast and its accompanying article in 2025, Frum noted that, "At the very beginning of the first Trump presidency, back in 2017, I posted on Twitter the following thought: Regular reminder that Donald Trump’s core competency is not dealmaking with powerful counter-parties. It is duping gullible victims.” The quote was reiterated as part of an introduction of Frum shortly thereafter by Charlie Sykes to the video audience watching his Substack publication, To the Contrary.

=== Criticism of the Republican Party after 2008 ===
In 2009, Frum denounced various anti-Obama conspiracy theories as "wild accusations and the paranoid delusions coming from the fever swamps." In his blog, Frum challenged the Republican conception of the Tea Party as a being a libertarian movement. He described the Tea Party as "a movement of relatively older and relatively affluent Americans whose expectations have been disrupted by the worst economic crisis since the Great Depression. They are looking for an explanation of the catastrophe – and a villain to blame. They are finding it in the same place that (Michelle) Bachmann and her co-religionists located it 30 years ago: a deeply hostile national government controlled by alien and suspect forces, with Barack Obama as their leader and symbol." Frum described Bachmann's political beliefs, some of which he called "paranoid", as "[emerging] from a religious philosophy that rejects the federal government as an alien instrument of destruction, ripping apart a Christian society. Bachmann's religiously grounded rejection of the American state finds a hearing with many more conventional conservatives radicalized by today's hard economic times."

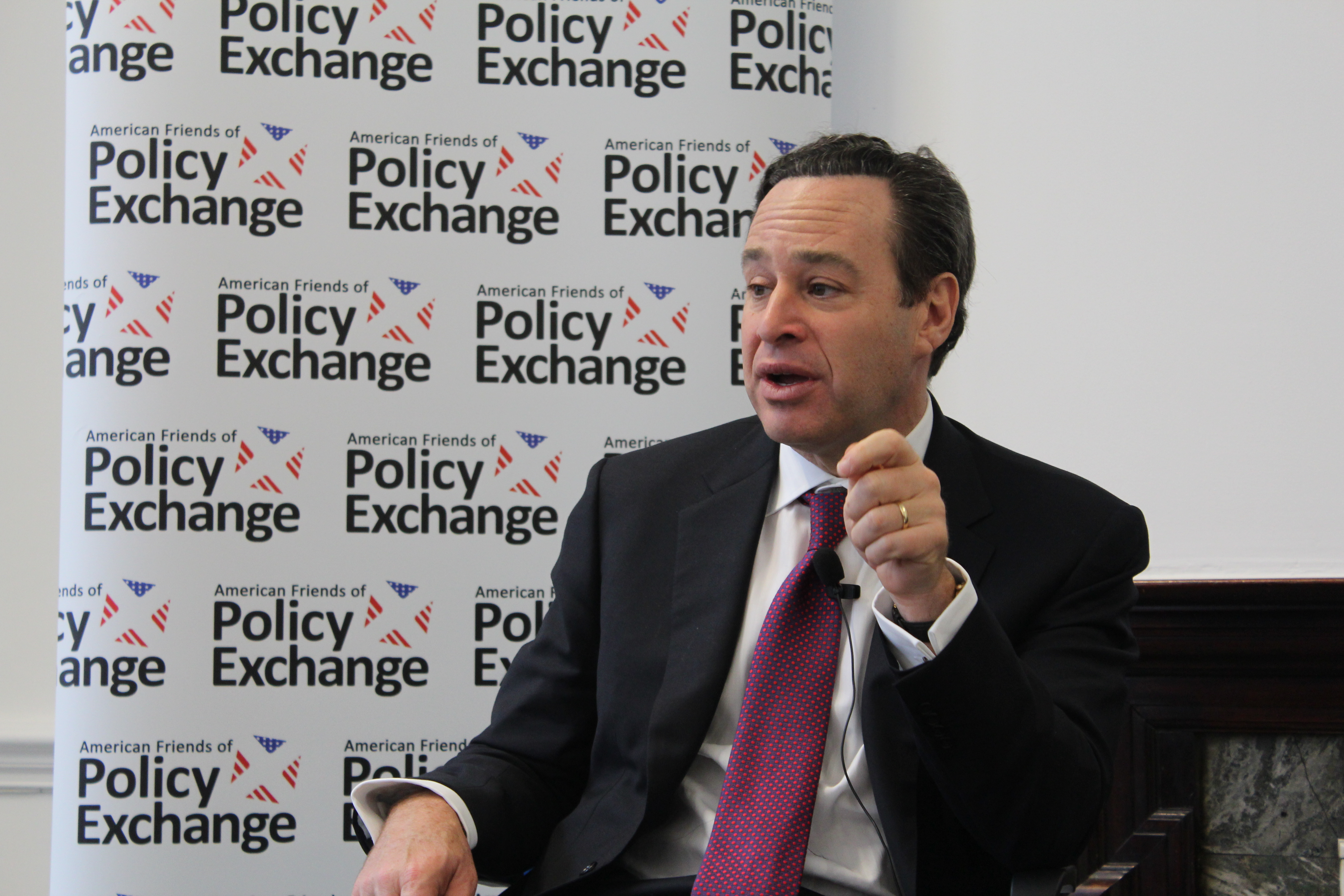
Frum speaking to Policy Exchange in 2013

On August 14, 2009, on Bill Moyers Journal, Frum challenged certain Republican political tactics in opposing healthcare and other Democratic initiatives as "outrageous", "dangerous", and ineffective. As Congress prepared to pass the Patient Protection and Affordable Care Act in March 2010, Frum again criticized the Republican strategy of refusing to negotiate with President Obama and congressional Democrats on healthcare reform, saying that it had resulted in the Republicans' "most crushing legislative defeat since the 1960s". Before making this statement, Frum had been associated with the American Enterprise Institute (AEI). He resigned from the AEI a few days later. Following the temporary withdrawal of a Republican effort to repeal the ACA in 2017, Frum wrote an article in the Atlantic in which he chastised fellow Republicans and conservatives for failing to take his advice to behave with moderation and humility.

In a September 2011 article, Tablet Magazine wrote: "as the Tea Party has come to dominate the GOP, Frum has been transformed in a remarkably short period of time from right-wing royalty to apostate" and quoted him as saying: "There's a style and a sensibility in the Republican Party right now that I find myself removed from, [but] you can do more good for the country by working for a better Republican Party than by leaving it to the extremists. What have they done to deserve that inheritance?"

Writing for New York magazine in November 2011, Frum described his reaction to fellow Republicans, who had distanced themselves from him, saying, "Some of my Republican friends ask if I've gone crazy. I say: Look in the mirror." He described the development of an "alternative reality" within which the party, conservative think-tanks, and right-wing commentators operate from a set of lies about the economy and nonexistent threats to their traditional base of supporters. He expressed concern over the inability of moderate Republicans to criticize their conservative brethren, contrasting this to the 1960s split between moderate Ripon Republicans and conservative Goldwater Republicans, when moderates such as Michigan governor George Romney were publicly critical of the conservatives.

== Personal life ==
Frum is married to the writer Danielle Crittenden, the stepdaughter of former Toronto Sun editor Peter Worthington, and they had three children. Their daughter Miranda died in February 2024, age 32, from complications of a 2019 brain tumor. He is a distant cousin of economist Paul Krugman. Frum considers himself "a not especially observant Jew". Alexander Hamilton and Abraham Lincoln are among his favorite historical figures. Marcel Proust is his favorite novelist.

== Bibliography ==
=== Books ===
- Frum, David (May 26, 2020). Trumpocalypse: Restoring American Democracy. Harper. ISBN 978-0062978417.
- Frum, David (January 16, 2018). Trumpocracy: The Corruption of the American Republic. Harper. ISBN 978-0-06-279673-8.
- Frum, David (November 8, 2012). Why Romney Lost (And What the GOP Can Do About It). New York City: Newsweek. p. 224. ASIN B00A3EOVKS.
- Frum, David (December 31, 2007). Comeback: Conservatism That Can Win Again. New York City: Doubleday. p. 224. ISBN 978-0-385-51533-7.
- Frum, David; Perle, Richard (2004). An End to Evil: How to Win the War on Terror. New York and Toronto: Random House. p. 304. ISBN 978-1-4000-6194-5.
- Frum, David (2003). The Right Man: The Surprise Presidency of George W. Bush. Random House. p. 320. ISBN 978-0-375-50903-2.
- Frum, David (2000). How We Got Here: The 70's: The Decade That Brought You Modern Life—For Better or Worse. New York: Basic Books. p. 448. ISBN 978-0-465-04195-4.
- Frum, David (1997). What's Right: The New Conservative Majority and the Remaking of America. Basic Books. p. 224. ISBN 978-0-465-04198-5.
- Frum, David (1996). What's Right: The New Conservatism and What It Means for Canada. Mississauga, Ontario: Random House of Canada. p. 308. ISBN 978-0-679-30783-9.
- Frum, David (1995). Dead Right. Basic Books. p. 256. ISBN 978-0-465-09825-5.
- de Soto, Hernando; Frum, David (2003). The Mystery of Capital: Why Capitalism Triumphs in the West and Fails Everywhere Else. Basic Books. p. 288. ISBN 978-0-465-01615-0. "I ghostwrote it, but the research & concepts are all his."

=== Critical studies and reviews of Frum's work ===
- Tomasky, Michael (February 22, 2018). "The worst of the worst". The New York Review of Books. 65 (3): 4, 6, 8. Review of Trumpocracy.

== See also ==
- List of newspaper columnists
