= Trireme Partners =

Former US limited partnership venture capital company

Trireme Partners LLP
- Industry: Venture capital
- Founded: 2001; 25 years ago
- Founders: Richard Perle; Gerald Hillman
- Defunct: 2005
- Fate: Dissolved

Trireme Partners LLP was a US limited partnership venture capital company that invested in technology, goods, and services related to Homeland Security. The name "Trireme" was taken from a Greek warship designed with three banks of rowers.

Established by Richard Perle, Gerald Hillman and Christopher Harriman, Trireme Partners was a Delaware entity registered in November 2001. One of the firm's major investors was Boeing, which invested US$20 million.

Perle became the subject of controversy in 2003 following a New Yorker article that alleged that Perle had offered to influence American foreign policy in Saudi Arabia in exchange for investment in Trireme.

Trireme Partners completed its business and dissolved in 2005.

== History and investors ==
Perle set up Trireme Partners in 2001. Trireme Partners first sought an investment from Boeing in February 2002. Boeing committed to invest $20 million two months later. The company received a $2.5 million investment from Hollinger International Inc. in 2003 which was reportedly never reported to the audit committee.

== Criticism ==
In March 2003, Perle became embroiled in controversy after The New Yorker published an article by Seymour Hersh describing a meeting between Perle, the arms dealer Adnan Khashoggi, and Saudi businessman Harb Zuhair, in which Perle allegedly offered to influence American foreign policy in Saudi Arabia in exchange for investment in Trireme. The U.S. Department of Defense Inspector General investigated the conflict of interest and determined that Perle did not violate the conflict of interest provision because he was only working eight days per annum at the Defense Department at the time, which was less than the 60 days of service requirement.
