= Richard Perle =

American political advisor

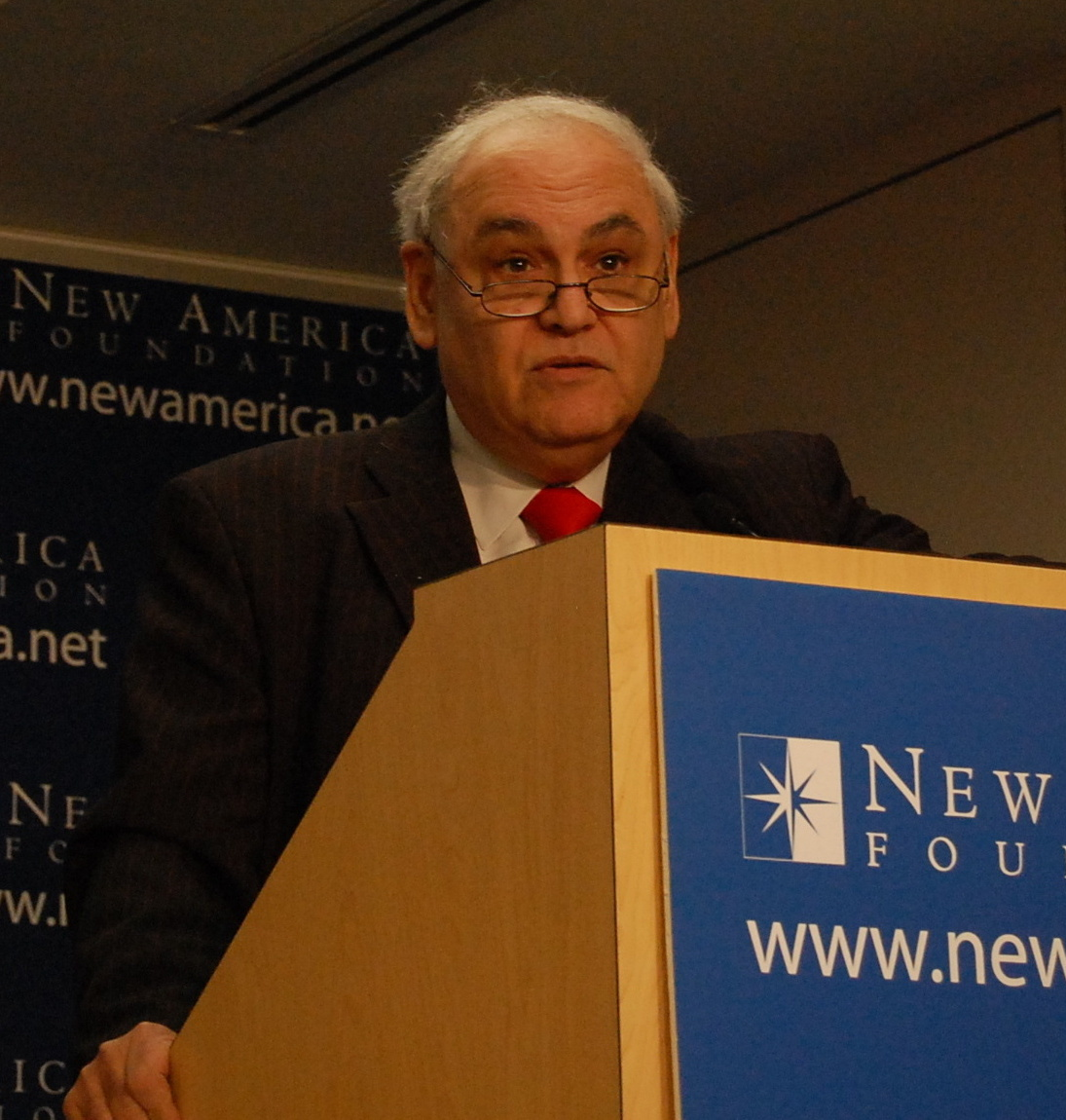
- Perle in 2009

Chairman of the Defense Policy Board Advisory Committee
- In office 2001–2003
- President: George W. Bush

1st Assistant Secretary of Defense for Global Strategic Affairs
- In office August 5, 1981 – May 8, 1987
- President: Ronald Reagan
- Preceded by: Office Created
- Succeeded by: Ronald F. Lehman

Personal details
- Born: Richard Norman Perle; September 16, 1941 (age 85) New York City, New York
- Party: Republican
- Spouse: Leslie Joan Barr (m. 1977)
- Children: 1
- Education: University of Southern California (BA); Princeton University (MA)
- Profession: Political scientist

Richard Norman Perle (born September 16, 1941) is an American political advisor who served as the Assistant Secretary of Defense for Global Strategic Affairs under President Ronald Reagan. He began his political career as a senior staff member to Senator Henry "Scoop" Jackson on the Senate Armed Services Committee in the 1970s. He served on the Defense Policy Board Advisory Committee from 1987 to 2004 where he served as chairman from 2001 to 2003 under the Bush administration before resigning due to a conflict of interest.

A key advisor to Secretary of Defense Donald Rumsfeld in the Bush administration, Perle was an architect of the Iraq War. In March 2001, he claimed that the Saddam Hussein regime possessed weapons of mass destruction. He has been described as a neoconservative hawk on foreign policy issues. He has been involved with several think-tanks, including the Washington Institute for Near East Policy, the Center for Security Policy, the American Enterprise Institute, Project for the New American Century, and the Jewish Institute for National Security Affairs.

== Early life and education ==
Perle was born in New York City, New York, the son of Jewish parents, Martha Gloria and Jack Harold Perle. As a child, he moved to California, where he attended Hollywood High School in Los Angeles; his classmates including actor Mike Farrell, singer Ricky Nelson, and Joan Wohlstetter (the daughter of Albert and Roberta Wohlstetter of the Rand Corporation).

Perle earned a B.A. in International Politics in 1964 from the University of Southern California. As an undergraduate he studied in Copenhagen at Denmark's International Study Program. He also studied at the London School of Economics and obtained a M.A. in political science from Princeton University in 1967.

== Career ==
=== Office of Senator Henry Jackson ===
From 1969 to 1980, Perle worked as a staffer for Democratic Senator Henry M. Jackson of Washington whom he met through Albert Wohlstetter. Perle recalls his early involvement with Wohlstetter: "Albert Wohlstetter phoned me one day. I was still a graduate student at Princeton ... and he said, could you come to Washington for a few days and interview some people and draft a report on the current debate shaping up in the Senate over ballistic missile defense, which was a hot issue ... And he said, I've asked somebody else to do this too, and maybe the two of you could work together. The someone else was Paul Wolfowitz. So Paul and I came to Washington as volunteers for a few days, to interview people, and one of the people we interviewed was Scoop Jackson and it was love at first sight ... I was there for eleven years."

As a staffer, Perle drafted the Jackson–Vanik amendment to the 1972 International Grains Agreement (IGA), or "Russian Wheat Deal" negotiated by Richard Nixon and the Soviet Union which made for the first time by law a trade agreement contingent upon the fundamental human right of Soviet Jews to emigrate. He was considered an extremely knowledgeable and influential person in the Senate debates on arms control. By his own admission, Perle acquired the reputation of an influential figure who preferred to work in the background, a reputation that has followed him through the years in both the public and the private sectors. At some point (usually said to be during his time in the Reagan administration) Perle acquired the nickname "The Prince of Darkness" due to his hardline opposition to any arms control agreements, which has been used both as a slur by his critics and as a joke by supporters (Time, 23 March 1987, "Richard Perle: Farewell Dark Prince"). However, he has been quoted: "I really resent being depicted as some sort of dark mystic or some demonic power. ... All I can do is sit down and talk to someone. ..." (The New York Times, 4 December 1977, Jackson Aide Stirs Criticism in Arms Debate, Richard L. Madden)

=== Opposition to nuclear arms reduction ===
Perle was considered a hardliner in arms reduction negotiations with the Soviet Union and has stated that his opposition to arms control under the Carter administration had to do with his view that the U.S. was giving up too much at the negotiation table and not receiving nearly enough concessions from the Soviets. Perle called the arms talks under negotiation in the late 1970s "the rawest deal of the century".

Perle's objection to the arms talks between the Carter administration and the Soviet Union revolved primarily around Carter's agreement to halt all cruise missile development. Perle is widely credited for spearheading opposition to the treaty, which was never ratified by the Senate.

Perle, with fellow neoconservative Paul Wolfowitz, played a supporting role in the ballistic missile defense project that was launched in the 1980s called the Strategic Defense Initiative.("Star Wars") Perle was influential in creating several organizations and think-tanks in order to pressure public opinion and sway policy makers on ballistic missile defense. During the second Bush administration missile defense programs saw dramatic budget increases under the direction of Perle as chair of the Defense Policy Board.

In 2010, Perle voiced opposition to the Obama administration's New START Treaty, comparing it unfavorably to the "watershed" 1987 INF Treaty signed by Ronald Reagan. However, Jonathan Chait has pointed out that Perle vehemently opposed the INF Treaty when it was initially signed, calling it "flawed enough to require renegotiation with the Soviets" and arguing that "the treaty does not do many of the key things the Administration says it does."

=== Transition into neoconservatism ===
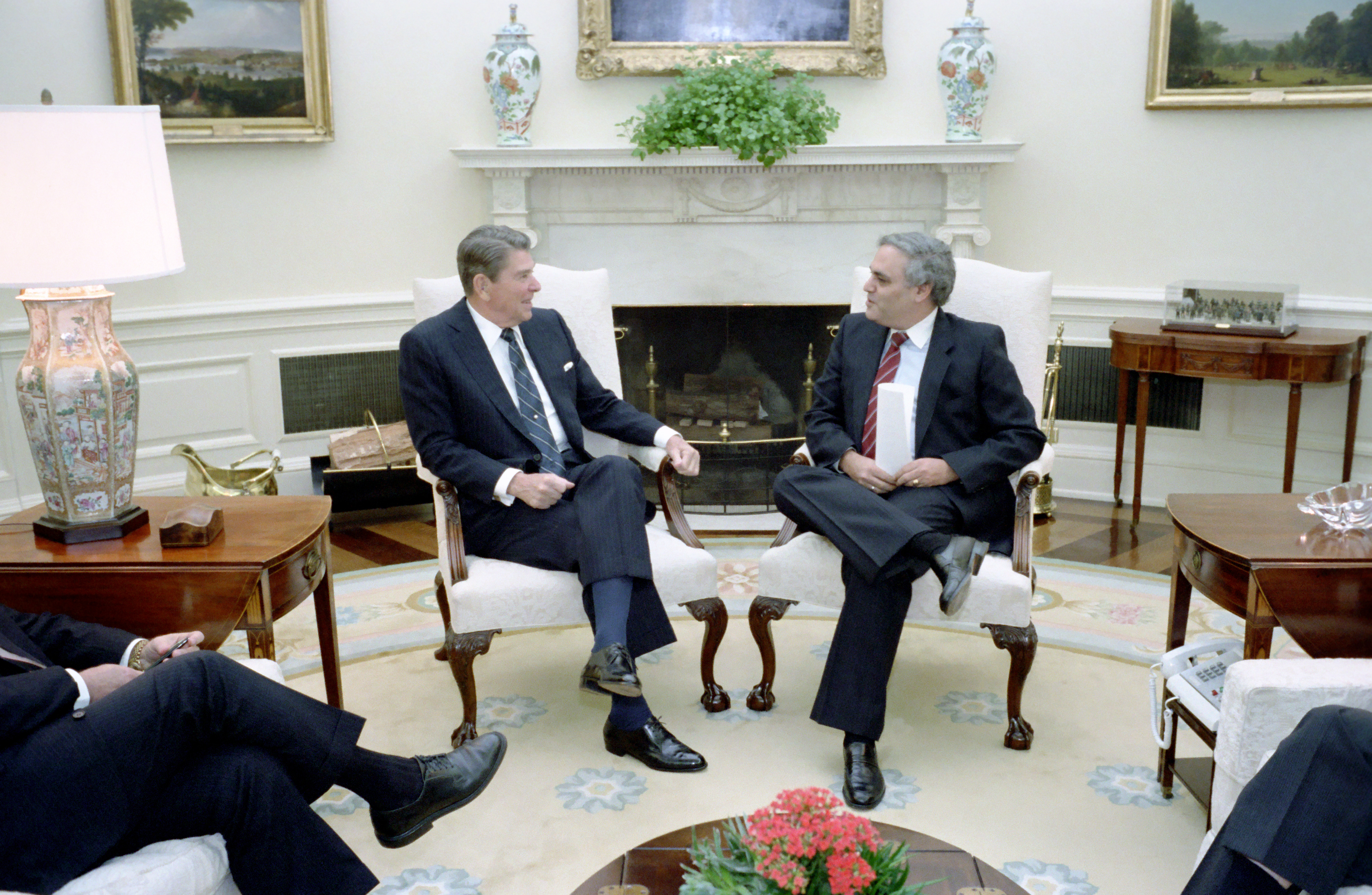
Perle with U.S President Ronald Reagan in the Oval Office on May 2, 1987

Perle is a self-described neoconservative, like several around Henry M. "Scoop" Jackson, as he told Ben Wattenberg in an interview specifically about him becoming a neoconservative.

Ben Wattenberg: Now, Scoop was surrounded by people who then and certainly now are called neoconservatives. It's become a fashionable word now thanks to you and your colleagues because you're all categorized that way. How did that come into your life, that whole school of thought?

Richard Perle: Well, I think the term has something to do with the sense that those of us who are now called neo-conservatives were at one time liberals, and in this ...

Ben Wattenberg: Irving Kristol said a neoconservative is a liberal who's been mugged by reality.

Richard Perle: Right. And I think that's a fair description, and I suppose all of us were liberal at one time. I was liberal in high school and a little bit into college. But reality and rigor are important tonics, and if you got into the world of international affairs and you looked with some rigor at what was going on in the world, it was really hard to be liberal and naïve.

External videos
- Presentation by Perle and David Frum on An End to Evil, January 9, 2004, C-SPAN
- Booknotes interview with Perle on An End to Evil, March 7, 2004, C-SPAN

Perle's book An End to Evil: How to Win the War on Terror which he coauthored with fellow neoconservative David Frum in 2004 criticizes American bureaucracy, civil service, and law. The book suggests that Americans must "overhaul the institutions of our government to ready them for a new kind of war against a new kind of enemy" including the FBI, CIA, armed forces, and State Department. The book is also used as a defense of the 2003 invasion of Iraq and outlines important neoconservative ideas, including ways to abandon all Israeli–Palestinian peace processes, invade Syria, and implement strict US domestic surveillance with biometric identity cards and public vigilance to hinder potential terrorist immigrant or terrorist sympathizer threats. Perle and Frum conclude: "For us, terrorism remains the great evil of our time, and the war against this evil, our generation's great cause. ... There is no middle way for Americans: it is victory or holocaust."

==== Neoconservative leadership ====
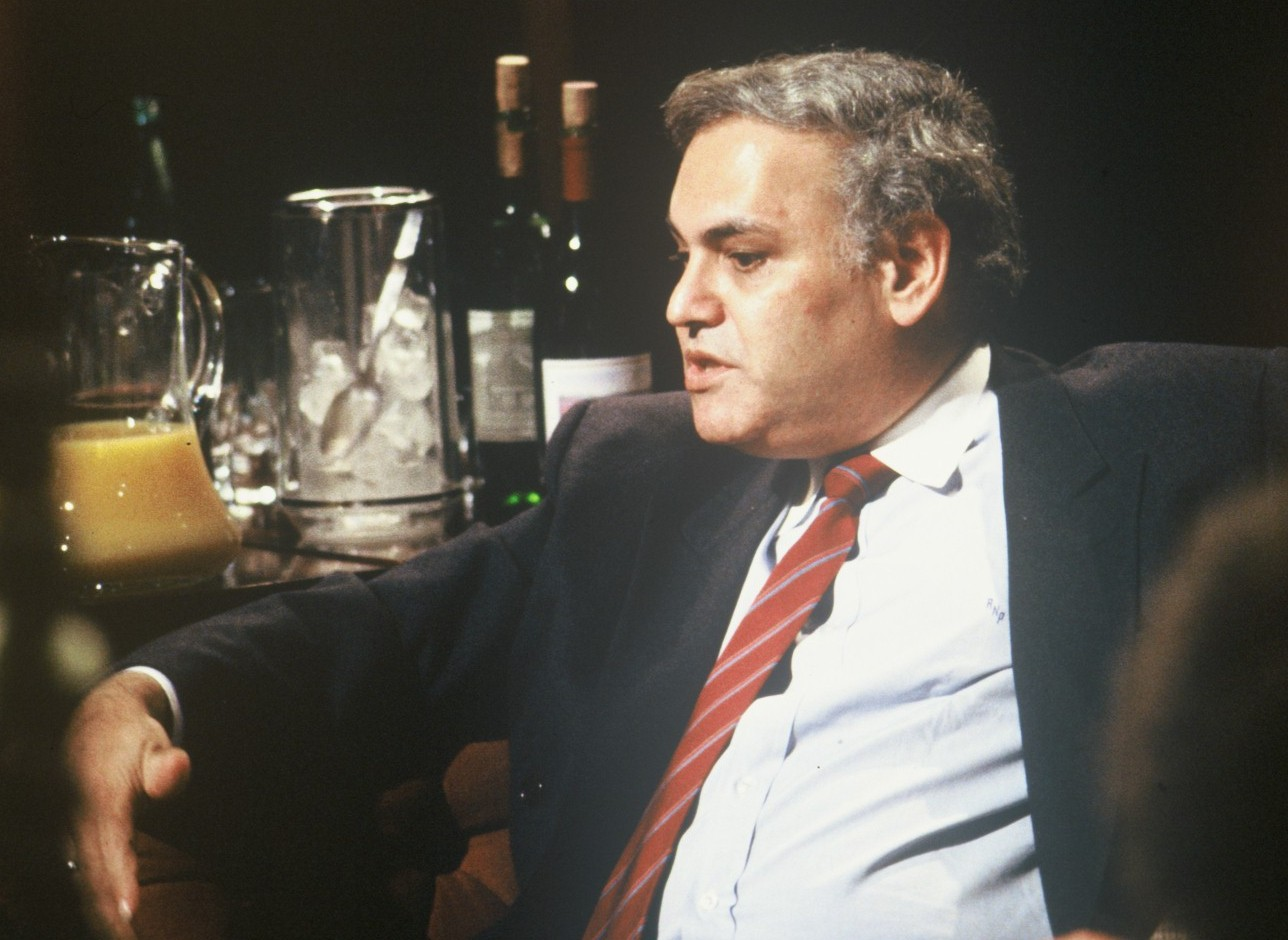
Appearing on British television discussion programme After Dark on 10 June 1989: Britain – Out on a Limb

Over the past few decades, a tight-knit group of neo-conservatives have had a significant impact in the carving out of American foreign policies, especially those concerning the Middle East. Arguably at the helm of the neoconservative movement is Richard Perle. He has been aided by other prominent neoconservatives, including Paul Wolfowitz and Douglas Feith.

Members of the Neocon core have been interrelated for decades through positions in government, think-tanks, business corporations, and even family ties. As journalist and writer of neoconservative ideology Jacob Heilbrunn states: "neo-conservatism was turned into an actual movement by Irving Kristol and Norman Podhoretz. Even today, the neoconservative movement is best described as an extended family based largely on the informal social networks patiently forged by these two patriarchs."

Members of the neoconservative movement are also leaders of many influential "letterhead organizations" (LHO's) and think-tanks such as the American Enterprise Institute, Project for the New American Century, Committee for Peace and Security in the Gulf, Committee for the Liberation of Iraq, and the U.S. Committee for a Free Lebanon. These organizations act as a support system for many neoconservative beliefs and help members of the movement draft policy papers, raise money and media attention, and lobby policymakers in order to protect their own political and personal agendas. A sociologist who examined the memberships of such neoconservative organizations ultimately concluded that "the activities of fourteen organizations were coordinated by individuals who comprised a web of interlocking memberships."

From 1981 to 1982, Wolfowitz was appointed head of the policy planning staff in the State Department. In the same year Perle, who was an assistant secretary for international security policy in President Reagan's defense department hired and promoted Douglas Feith after he had been fired from his position as a Middle East analyst at the National Security Council. Later it was found out that Feith was fired due to an FBI investigation suspecting that he had distributed confidential materials to an Israeli embassy official. With the right connections and the support of his close allies Wolfowitz and Perle, Feith was able to attain his position as undersecretary for policy in the Pentagon in 2001, from which he resigned in 2005. In return, he appointed Perle as chairman of the Defense Policy Board. This friendship was mutually beneficial for both Perle and Feith, who used their overlapping positions of power to help promote the other and bail each other out of trouble. Perle is nonetheless an inspiration and mentor to Feith who describes him as a "godfather" and trusts that "He would actively work to help anybody he had worked with and liked and admired and who he thought was useful to the overall cause of U.S. national security as he saw it." Both Wolfowitz and Feith later worked closely together to promote the War in Iraq after 9/11, including heading the Office of Special Plans.

=== War with Iraq ===
==== Pre-2003 invasion ====
Like many in the neoconservative movement, Perle had long been an advocate of regime change in Iraq. In 1998 Perle led an effort known as the Project for the New American Century with close neoconservative allies Wolfowitz, Woolsey, Elliott Abrams, and John Bolton. The Project culminated in a letter sent to US President Bill Clinton calling for the military overthrow of Saddam Hussein's regime. Prior to and after the 2003 invasion of Iraq, Perle held several exclusive meetings in his home where he discussed issues regarding American foreign policy on Iraq. In an effort to help fund their goals, Ahmed Chalabi an Iraqi-born businessman and founder of the Iraqi National Congress, helped Perle secure millions of dollars from the U.S. government in 1990. Chalabi was one of the key figures driving the war in Iraq and helped transmit important "information" to U.S. Congress and the public that would successfully help sell the war effort. Moreover, Perle and Chalabi also had very similar motives: they both wanted the Hussein regime deposed and Chalabi elected president.

In 2004, the FBI investigated Chalabi after U.S. intelligence sources revealed that he was working as a double agent for Iran. Perle was also involved in efforts to develop alternative intelligence estimates to help justify the decision to go to war in Iraq. He and other neoconservative leaders claimed that the intelligence community had grossly underestimated threats to the national security of the U.S. Thus, they established two secret offices in the Pentagon after September 11 – the Counter Terrorism Evaluation Group and the Office of Special Plans. Nonetheless, Perle helped manage and hire neoconservative affiliated staff for both these organizations that created their own policies and intelligence reports by dodging existing government entities. Perle's reasoning for implementing the Office of Special Plans was essentially to "bring in people with fresh eyes to review the intelligence that the CIA and other agencies had collected." In an interview with CNN on September 16, 2001, Perle announced "Even if we cannot prove to the standards that we enjoy in our own civil society that they were involved, we do know, for example, that Saddam Hussein has ties to Osama Bin Laden ..." Flynt Leverett, a senior staff member of the Bush National Security Council states: "There were constant efforts to pressure the intelligence community to provide assessments that would support their views. If they couldn't get what they wanted out of the intelligence community, they simply created their own intelligence." Moreover, Perle allegedly gave several speeches and talks throughout Europe trying to promote the war effort abroad. He allegedly told the British House of Commons that the U.S. would attack Iraq even if UN weapons inspectors didn't find anything. Lawrence Wilkerson, former chief of staff to Secretary of State Colin Powell announced that Perle was "making remarks as if he were an official inside the U.S. government." In countries like Germany, France, Britain, and Japan, people perceived him as a government authority whose knowledge and clout on U.S. policy appeared legitimate.

Perle argued that what he referred to as terrorist Abu Nidal's "sanctuary" in Saddam Hussein's Iraq was justification for the U.S. military invasion of Iraq. Perle states this in the recent PBS documentary series "America At A Crossroads", and refers to President Bush's 9/11 speech in which Bush stated: "We will make no distinction between the terrorists who committed these acts and those who harbor them." In an interview for "Saddam's Ultimate Solution", the 11 July 2002 episode of the PBS series Wide Angle, he said: "Saddam is much weaker than we think he is. He's weaker militarily. We know he's got about a third of what he had in 1991. But it's a house of cards. He rules by fear because he knows there is no underlying support. Support for Saddam, including within his military organization, will collapse at the first whiff of gunpowder. Now, it isn't going to be over in 24 hours, but it isn't going to be months either." Perle advocated invading Iraq with only 40,000 troops, and complained about the calls by then Gen. Eric Shinseki to use 660,000 troops. He preferred a strategy similar to that used in the Afghan war, in which the U.S. would insert SOF (Special Operations Forces), along with some two divisions, to assist native Kurdish and Shi'ite rebels, much as the United States had done with the Northern Alliance against the Taliban.

==== Iraq policy and Bush criticism ====
The Senate Intelligence Committee eventually discovered that President Bush and his advisers heavily exaggerated the claims of weapons of mass destruction in Iraq and terrorist ties to Al Qaeda which were not validated by U.S. intelligence units. Since this scandal, Perle has made several attempts to reduce his alleged involvement in the war efforts stating: "Huge mistakes were made, and I want to be very clear on this: They were not made by neoconservatives, who had almost no voice in what happened". In an interview he gave Vanity Fair that was excerpted in an article appearing in the 4 November 2006 Los Angeles Times, he denied having a role in the planning of the war. He is reported to have told Vanity Fair, "I'm getting damn tired of being described as an architect of the war." This is not congruent with his signing of the PNAC letter in 1998. "I was in favor of bringing down Saddam. Nobody said, 'Go design the campaign to do that.' I had no responsibility for that." The same Los Angeles Times article reports that Perle now believes that his advocacy of the Iraq war was wrong.

Perle expressed regret of his support of the invasion and faulted the "dysfunction" in the Bush administration for the troubled occupation. "I think now I probably would have said, 'Let's consider other strategies for dealing with the thing that concerns us most, which is Saddam supplying weapons of mass destruction to terrorists'. The decisions did not get made that should have been. They didn't get made in a timely fashion, and the differences were argued out endlessly. At the end of the day, you have to hold the president responsible." Nevertheless, Perle vociferously defended the war in Iraq, arguing to the wife of a deployed soldier in a 2007 PBS film that to end the war now would be to dishonor those who had already died in the cause.

==== Disputed role in Bush administration ====
Conservative commentator David Brooks has said that, in his opinion, Perle's influence in the Bush administration is exaggerated. In a 2004 New York Times article, Brooks wrote that; "There have been hundreds of references ... to Richard Perle's insidious power over administration policy, but I've been told by senior administration officials that he has had no significant meetings with Bush or Cheney since they assumed office. If he's shaping their decisions, he must be microwaving his ideas into their fillings".

==== On Iraq Study Group proposals ====
In a December 2006 interview with Die Zeit, Perle strongly criticized the Iraq Study Group proposals, saying: "I have never seen such a foolish report. ... A report that begins with false premises ends with nothing."

=== Other views on foreign policy ===
==== United Nations ====
Perle is a frequent critic of the United Nations, stating that it is an embodiment of "... the liberal conceit of safety through international law administered by international institutions. ... " He has also attacked the United Nations Security Council veto power as a flawed concept, arguing that the only time the U.N. utilized force during the Cold War was when "... the Soviets were not in the chamber to veto it".

Furthermore, shortly after the invasion of Iraq, Perle stated that; "in this case international law stood in the way of doing the right thing". He also argued that there was "no practical mechanism consistent with the rules of the UN for dealing with Saddam Hussein". At the time, these comments provoked controversy among critics of the war, who argued that they contradicted the U.S.'s official stance on the legality of the invasion.

==== Israel ====
In 1996 during the Clinton administration, Perle led a study group with David Wurmser that produced a report on balancing power in the Middle East, specifically in Israel's favor. The report, "A Clean Break: A New Strategy for Securing the Realm", made clear recommendations about steering Israel away from socialist principles, making efforts to become more self-reliant, "nurturing alternatives to Arafat's exclusive grip on Palestinian society", and working more closely with countries such as Jordan and Turkey. It also stated the removal of Saddam Hussein from power in Iraq should be a key objective for the Israeli state, advocated armed incursions into Lebanon, and suggested Arab states should be challenged as undemocratic. Moreover, Perle personally delivered the report to the incoming Likud-led government in hopes of influencing the new Prime Minister Benjamin Netanyahu.

==== Defense ====
Perle advocates pre-emptive strikes, such as in Iraq, as an extension of America's right to self-defense. For example, Perle has expressed support for a theoretical first strike on North Korean and Iranian nuclear facilities.

=== Business interests and controversies ===
==== Bribery accusations and alleged conflicts of interest ====
Perle has on occasion been accused of being an Israeli agent of influence. It has been reported that, while he was working for Jackson, "An FBI summary of a 1970 wiretap recorded Perle discussing classified information with someone at the Israeli embassy. He came under fire in 1983 when newspapers reported he received substantial payments to represent the interests of an Israeli weapons company. Perle denied a conflict of interest, insisting that, although he received payment for these services after he had assumed his position in the Defense Department, he was between government jobs when he worked for the Israeli firm."

From 1981 to 1987, Perle was Assistant Secretary of Defense for international security policy in the Reagan administration. In a New York Times article, Perle was criticized for recommending that the Army purchase an armaments system from an Israeli company that a year earlier had paid him $50,000 in consulting fees. Perle acknowledged receiving the payment the same month he joined the Reagan administration, but said the payment was for work done before joining the government and that he had informed the Army of this prior consulting work. Perle was never indicted for anything related to the incident.

In March 2004, another New York Times article reported that, while chairman of the Defense Policy Board, Perle had contracted with the troubled telecommunications giant Global Crossing to help overcome opposition from the FBI and the Pentagon to the sale of its assets to Hong Kong-based Hutchison Whampoa. Since the military employed the company's fiber optics network for communications, the brass argued that sale to a foreign-owned, especially Chinese, corporation would compromise national security. Perle was to be paid $125,000 to promote the deal, with an extra $600,000 contingent fee on its approval. This controversy led to accusations of bribery, and Perle resigned as chairman on March 27, 2003, though he remained on the board.

Perle is also known to have demanded payment for press interviews while he was the chairman of the Defense Policy Board, a practice that has raised accusations of not only ethical but legal impropriety.

==== Unresolved legal issues ====
In 1978, while working with the Senate Armed Services Committee, Perle was caught in a security breach on a wiretap of the Israeli embassy, by CIA director Stansfield Turner. Although Turner urged Senator Jackson to fire him, Perle received a warning and was kept on staff according to the Washington Post.

Perle has served as a Director of Hollinger International since June 1994. He is also co-chairman of Hollinger Digital Inc. and a Director of Jerusalem Post, both of which are subsidiaries of the company. He has served as a director of GeoBiotics. On August 31, 2004, a special committee of the Board of Directors investigating the alleged misconduct of the controlling shareholders of Hollinger International submitted the 512-page Breeden Report to the U.S. Securities and Exchange Commission (SEC). In the report, Perle is singled out as having breached his fiduciary responsibilities as a company director by authorizing several controversial transactions which diverted the company's net profit from the shareholders to the accounts of various executives. Perle received over $3 million in bonuses on top of his salary, bringing the total to $5.4 million, and the investigating committee called for him to return the money.

Top Hollinger executives dismissed the report and have filed a defamation lawsuit against the head of the investigating committee, former SEC chairman Richard C. Breeden. However, in 2005, Perle publicly acknowledged he had been served a 'Wells notice', a formal warning that the S.E.C.'s enforcement staff had found sufficient evidence of wrongdoing to bring a civil lawsuit.

==== Seymour Hersh and "Lunch with the Chairman" ====
In July 2001, George W. Bush appointed Perle chairman of the Defense Policy Board Advisory Committee, which advises the Department of Defense. Two years later a newspaper article accused Perle of a conflict of interest, claiming Perle stood to profit financially by influencing government policy. The article alleged that Perle had business dealings with Saudi investors and linked him to the intelligence-related computer firm Trireme Partners LLP, which he claimed stood to profit from the war in Iraq.

That same day, Perle was being interviewed on the issue of Iraq by CNN's Wolf Blitzer. Shortly before the interview ended, Blitzer quoted the aforementioned news article and asked for Perle's response. Perle dismissed the premise of the article and argued that it lacked "any consistent theme". Added Perle: "Sy Hersh is the closest thing American journalism has to a terrorist, frankly."

On March 11, Perle told the New York Sun as regards Hersh's article that "I intend to launch legal action in the United Kingdom. I'm talking to Queen's Counsel right now". He claimed it was easier to win libel cases in England, and that therefore made it a better location. In the end, Perle did not file any legal case. Instead, on March 27, 2003, he resigned as chairman of the Defense Policy Board, although he still remained a member of the board.

==== Adviser to Muammar al-Gaddafi ====
As a member of the Cambridge, Massachusetts-based consulting firm Monitor Group, Perle was an advisor to Libyan dictator Muammar al-Gaddafi in 2006. "Perle traveled to Libya twice in 2006 and met with Vice President Dick Cheney after the trips." According to Monitor documents, Perle traveled to Libya with several other advisers to hold lectures and workshops, and promote the image of Libya and its ruler.

==== Iraq oil deal ====
In July 2008, The Wall Street Journal reported that Perle had made plans to invest in oil interests in Iraq, in collaboration with Iraqi Kurdish leaders in northern Iraq (Iraqi Kurdistan).

== Works ==
Perle is author of many articles and three books:

- An End to Evil: How to Win the War on Terror (with David Frum, 2003) ISBN 1-4000-6194-6
- Hard Line (1992) (ISBN 0-394-56552-5)
- Reshaping Western Security (ed.) (1991) (ISBN 0-8447-3790-9)

In 1992 he produced the PBS feature The Gulf Crisis: The Road to War.

In 2007, Perle presented the documentary "The Case for War: In Defense of Freedom", articulating his view of the challenges facing the U.S. after 9/11, and debating with his critics including Richard Holbrooke, Simon Jenkins, and Abdel Bari Atwan. The film was broadcast by PBS in their series America at a Crossroads, which generated considerable controversy.
