= An End to Evil: How to Win the War on Terror =

2004 book by Richard Perle and David Frum

- Author: David Frum, Richard Perle
- Language: English
- Genre: Political science
- Publisher: Random House Publishing Group
- Publication date: 2004
- Pages: 288
- ISBN: 0-345-47717-0
- OCLC: 53932244

An End to Evil: How to Win the War on Terror is a 2004 book about the war on terror, analyzing Islamic terrorist networks and proposing policies for the United States government to adopt to defeat them. The book was co-written by Richard Perle, who had previously been chairman of the Defense Policy Board Advisory Committee, and David Frum, a fellow at the American Enterprise Institute and former White House speechwriter during the Bush administration who originated the phrase, "axis of evil."

In 2004, Frum replied to some of the critics of the book in "He That Stands It Now...", an article that appeared in the National Review.

Danielle Pletka, a foreign policy analyst at the American Enterprise Institute, told The Jewish Daily Forward, "The political prescriptions contained are terrific. This is a very thoughtful articulation of how to fight the battle ahead of us."

Political scientist Fareed Zakaria said about the book: "It is now possible to describe a neoconservative foreign policy, and David Frum and Richard Perle's new book, An End to Evil: How to Win the War on Terror, is a useful guide to it. There have been many books written by neoconservatives on aspects of the war on terror, but because of the identity of the authors, the scope of the book and the vigor of argumentation, this one deserves special attention."

== Reviews ==
- Kamiya, Gary (January 30, 2004). ""An End to Evil" by David Frum and Richard Perle". salon.com. Archived from the original on October 19, 2008.
- Buchanan, Pat, Review, amconmag.com, March 1, 2004.
- Kakutani, Michiku, "A Confident Prescription For Foiling the Terrorists", The New York Times, January 13, 2004.
- Riklin, Geoffrey, "Book Review of An End to Evil: How to Win the War on Terror, by David Frum and Richard Perle", The Intellectual Conservative Web site, 17 March 2004.
- Hutchison, Harold C., "An End To Evil: How to Win the War on Terror, by David Frum and Richard Perle", Strategy Page Web site.
- Zakaria, Fareed, "Showing Them Who's Boss", The New York Times Book Review.
- Crock, Stan, "Two Jeremiads", Business Week, 2004-02-04.
- Powers, Thomas. "An End to Evil: How to Win the War on Terror". The New York Review of Books, 2004-05-11. 51, no. 4: 4. (unavailable online)
