= Harriet Miers Supreme Court nomination =

United States Supreme Court nomination

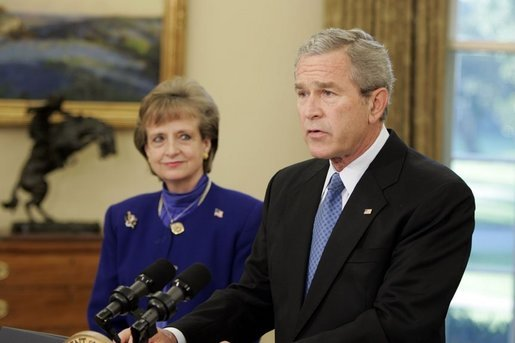
- President Bush, accompanied by Miers, announces the nomination in the Oval Office of the White House
- Nominee: Harriet Miers
- Nominated by: George W. Bush (president of the United States)
- Succeeding: Sandra Day O’Connor (associate justice)
- Date nominated: October 3, 2005
- Date withdrawn: October 27, 2005
- Outcome: Nomination withdrawn

On October 3, 2005, Harriet Miers was nominated for Associate Justice of the U.S. Supreme Court by President George W. Bush to replace retired Associate Justice Sandra Day O'Connor. Miers was, at the time, White House Counsel, and had previously served in several roles both during Bush's tenure as Governor of Texas and President.

Miers's nomination was negatively received across the political spectrum, with critics charging that she did not have enough judicial experience to sit on the court. Conservative commentator David Frum castigated the selection as an "unforced error", and Robert Bork (himself a failed Supreme Court nominee) denounced it a "disaster" and "a slap in the face to the conservatives who've been building up a conservative legal movement for the last 20 years." Hearings before the United States Senate Judiciary Committee had been scheduled to begin on November 7, and members of the Republican leadership had stated before the nomination that they aimed to have the nominee confirmed before Thanksgiving (November 24). Miers withdrew her nomination on October 27, 2005, and Bush nominated Samuel Alito four days later.

== Selection process ==
On July 1, 2005, Sandra Day O'Connor announced her plan to retire as an associate justice of the U.S. Supreme Court, effective as of the date that her replacement was confirmed by the United States Senate. Bush appointed Miers as head of the search committee for candidates to replace O'Connor. On July 19, Bush announced that he had chosen John Roberts as O'Connor's replacement. After William Rehnquist died of complications from thyroid cancer on September 3, Bush withdrew this nomination and renominated Roberts for Chief Justice, to which he was confirmed.

Meanwhile, Senate Minority Leader Harry Reid (D-Nevada) recommended Miers as O'Connor's successor. Bush agreed with Reid's suggestion, factoring comments by Senate Judiciary Committee Chairman Arlen Specter (R-Pennsylvania) and ranking member Patrick Leahy (D-Vermont) that Bush's nominees should be outside of the appellate court system. First Lady Laura Bush publicly expressed hope that he would nominate a woman.

On October 3, Bush nominated Miers to succeed O'Connor.

== Miers's background ==
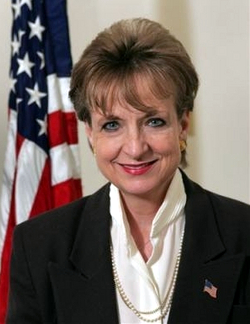
Portrait image of Miers

=== Education ===
Miers attended Southern Methodist University, where she received a bachelor's degree in mathematics (1967) and a Juris Doctor degree (1970). However, Miers' education would later prove troublesome during her nomination process. Her academic background went against a tradition that had gained momentum since the late 1970s of appointing justices who had received their collegiate, legal, and other graduate education at elite institutions. At the time of her nomination, all sitting justices hailed from the leading "Top 14" law schools (specifically Yale, Harvard, Stanford, Columbia, and Northwestern).

Consequently, as the nomination process developed, individuals across the partisan spectrum came to both denigrate Miers on account of her degrees as well as to paint them as a non-issue. Addressing her education, conservative columnist and psychiatrist Charles Krauthammer contended that "the Supreme Court is an elite institution. It is not one of the 'popular' branches of government"; conversely, Harry Reid (a graduate of George Washington University Law School's part-time program) stated he did not feel an Ivy League pedigree was a necessary criterion for placement on the court. However, in the long run, discussion over Miers' academic credentials was overshadowed by the focus placed on her career history and ties to the Bush administration, with fears of "snobbery" calls quieting discussion.

=== Professional experience ===
Miers had clerked for the Chief Judge of the United States District Court for the Northern District of Texas, but had never served as a judge. She had neither taught nor written to any substantial extent on law. In private practice, as a corporate litigator at the law firm Locke Lord, Miers had courtroom experience, but a scant and undistinguished track record of litigating in federal court (almost none litigating constitutional issues), and had never argued a case before the Supreme Court.

Speaking to Miers's lack of credentials, the White House quickly advanced the defense that 41 of the 110 Supreme Court Justices appointed to date had never served as a judge prior to their nomination. Some examples during the 20th century include William Moody (appointed 1906), Charles Evans Hughes (1910), James McReynolds (1914), Louis Brandeis (1916), George Sutherland (1922), Pierce Butler (1922), Harlan F. Stone (1925), Owen Roberts (1930), Stanley F. Reed (1938), Felix Frankfurter (1939), William O. Douglas (1939), Frank Murphy (1940), Robert Jackson (1941), Harold Burton (1945), Tom C. Clark (1949), Earl Warren (1953), Arthur Goldberg (1962), Abe Fortas (1965), Lewis Powell (1972), and William Rehnquist (1972). The White House's attempt to use this to placate opposition was at best ineffectual, and at worst, backfired: offering the comparison to Fortas or particularly Warren further inflamed opposition among conservatives, who do not look upon either as a great exemplar of the kind of Supreme Court justice desired. The White House also argued that 10 of the 34 Justices appointed since 1933 were appointed from positions within the President's administration (as was the case with Miers). These Justices include the aforementioned Powell, Warren, Frankfurter, and Douglas, as well as Arthur Goldberg and Tom C. Clark.

Reid, who had previously floated Miers as an example of an acceptable nominee (further inflaming conservative hostility), issued a statement:

In my view, the Supreme Court would benefit from the addition of a justice who has real experience as a practicing lawyer. The current justices have all been chosen from the lower federal courts. A nominee with relevant non-judicial experience would bring a different and useful perspective to the Court.

== Nomination issues ==
Because little was known about Miers' position on divisive issues, and because she had no prior experience as a judge, her nomination was subject to debate on both sides. Many critics were concerned that her inner-circle relationship with the president and his staff could lead to conflicts of interests in court cases. Republican Senator Sam Brownback stated on Good Morning America that "[t]here's precious little to go on and a deep concern that this would be a Souter-type candidate". David Souter had been nominated by George H. W. Bush under the expectation that he would be a conservative vote, yet he lacked a "paper trail" of prior decisions to justify these expectations, and turned out to be one of the court's more liberal members.

=== Positions on issues that might have come before the court ===
==== Abortion ====
The subject of Roe v. Wade, among other abortion-related Supreme Court precedents, was highly topical in this nomination, in part because O'Connor had voted to overturn a number of state restrictions on abortion, often in narrowly divided 5–4 decisions.

As the confirmation process proceeded, more became known about Miers' personal/judicial views on abortion. In 1989, when Miers was running for the Dallas City Council, she allegedly filled out a survey for the anti-abortion group Texas United for Life. The questionnaire sought to gauge candidates' feelings on the use of constitutional amendments or state laws to ban abortions in the event the Supreme Court overturned a 1973 ruling that established abortion rights. The questionnaire asked "If Congress passes a Human Life Amendment to the Constitution that would prohibit abortion except when it was necessary to prevent the death of the mother, would you actively support its ratification by the Texas Legislature." Miers answered "yes" to this question and all others listed.

Miers said in 1992 that she felt Supreme Court nominees should not be asked about how they would rule on abortion issues. In 1993, when the American Bar Association (ABA) opted to take a stance in favor of legal access to abortion, Miers fought to have the full membership of the ABA vote on the topic: "If we were going to take a position on this divisive issue, the members should have been able to vote."

It is not clear what impact, if any, her personal views would have had on her judicial rulings. The religious beliefs of nominees on abortion and other controversial social issues have been a significant part of confirmation hearings for nominees thought to have traditional religious beliefs. Some civil rights activists (notably the Catholic League for Civil and Religious Rights, Notre Dame law professor Charles Rice in the National Review, the civil rights group the Center for Jewish Values and the conservative Catholic group Fidelis) consider such interrogation by senators to be a violation of the constitutional prohibition of any religious tests for federal office.

Senator Brownback, a member of the Judiciary Committee, said there was a "good chance" he would vote against Miers if she testified that Roe v. Wade was "settled law".

Miers withdrew her nomination shortly after an awkward dispute she had in a private talk with Sen. Arlen Specter of Pennsylvania, then the Republican chairman of the Senate Judiciary Committee. At issue was what she had said during their private talk about the right to privacy, a major underpinning of Roe v. Wade.

==== Affirmative action ====
As President of the Texas State Bar, Miers supported affirmative action, going so far as to continue a quota system for women and ethnic minorities practicing law in the state. Bob Dunn, the outgoing president of the organization, described Miers as "certainly one of the leaders" in supporting the quota system.

==== The right to keep and bear arms ====
Miers included the "right to keep and bear arms" in a list of "precious liberties" contained in a commentary she authored in 1992.

==== Gay rights ====
Although Miers did not make her position clear on gay rights, she hinted at her views in answering a questionnaire submitted to her by a Texas gay rights group during her 1989 campaign for a Dallas City Council position. Miers indicated on the questionnaire that she supported civil rights for homosexuals, but opposed the repeal of the sodomy laws that were ultimately overturned by a 6–3 decision (with Justice O'Connor in the majority) in Lawrence v. Texas. Miers was mistakenly thought to have served on the board of the ex-gay organization Exodus International; she had actually served on the board of Exodus Ministries, a former prisoner rehabilitation organization.

==== Balance of powers ====
As President of the Texas State Bar, Miers fought legislation that would curtail the power of the Texas Supreme Court to limit attorneys fees in tort lawsuits. Some commentators have asked whether this portends a lack of respect for the proper role of the courts. For example, conservative activist Mark Levin responded to this information by saying, "[i]f there is a bias toward judicial supremacy, it's best that we know this now, in advance of a confirmation vote." Miers' rationale for withdrawing her nomination—that she feared the Senate's demand for information about her White House work would force a breach of Executive Branch secrecy—may indicate that she supported expansive presidential powers.

=== Other potential controversies: the Texas Lottery Commission ===
From 1995 to 2000, Miers chaired the Texas Lottery Commission (having been appointed by Bush when he was Governor of Texas).

In 1997, the Commission hired Lawrence Littwin as the lottery's executive director; five months later, he was fired. Littwin brought suit over his firing, alleging that the lottery contractor, GTech Corporation, had influenced the Commission to fire him for improper reasons. GTech settled the case by paying him $300,000, with Littwin agreeing not to discuss the case or the settlement.

== Reactions to her nomination ==
Miers' nomination drew criticism from both political parties. Principal complaints focused on her credentials, which critics charged were insufficient for the position.

Liberals and many conservatives also charged that her nomination was the result of political cronyism. Since her legal experience did not compare to that of other possible candidates, like federal appellate judges Edith Jones, Priscilla Owen, and Janice Rogers Brown, it was deemed likely that President Bush nominated Miers for her personal loyalty to him rather than for her qualifications. In letters to then-Governor Bush dating from 1997, she wrote, "You are the best governor ever - deserving of great respect," called Bush "cool," and wrote that he and his wife, Laura, were "the greatest!" She was compared to Michael Brown, a Bush appointee alleged to have gotten his position based on loyalty rather than experience. Brown had resigned as chief of FEMA exactly three weeks prior to Miers' nomination, amidst nearly universal condemnation of how he and his agency handled Hurricane Katrina.

Conservatives complained that there was no written record to demonstrate that she was either a strict constructionist or originalist in her approach to constitutional interpretation.

Notable conservative commentators expressing these or other concerns included newspaper columnists Pat Buchanan, Ann Coulter, Charles Krauthammer, William Kristol, Rush Limbaugh, Ramesh Ponnuru, and George Will; former Bush speechwriter David Frum; and constitutional scholar Randy Barnett. Finally, Robert Bork, one of the premier advocates of originalism and a Supreme Court nominee under President Reagan who was eventually rejected by the Senate, proclaimed that the nomination was "a disaster on every level," and a "slap in the face" to conservatives.

In addition to the initial positive comments from Democratic Senator Harry Reid, some prominent Republican conservatives were supportive of Miers, including former U.S. House Speaker Newt Gingrich, Focus on the Family founder James Dobson (who later suggested he would have recanted his endorsement if she had not withdrawn), Senator John Cornyn of Texas, columnist Mark Steyn, and former Indiana Senator Dan Coats, who became the Bush administration's appointed guide for Miers through the confirmation process.

In mid-October, the Senate Judiciary Committee requested Miers resubmit her judicial questionnaire after members complained her answers were "inadequate," "insufficient," and "insulting." Reports that the administration had told party activists that Miers would oppose abortion rights led the Judicial Committee to ask Miers if she had ever disclosed to anyone how she might rule from the bench. In the same question, it also requested information about "all communications by the Bush administration or individuals acting on behalf of the administration to any individuals or interest groups with respect to how you would rule." Miers wrote just one word in response: "No."

Rev. Rob Schenck (brother of Rev. Paul Schenck) met with Miers and learned that she was attending St. John's Episcopal Church, Washington, D.C.—which he noted for its ties to pro-gay attitudes within the Church—rather than a local chapter of the more fundamentalist Church of Christ as she had back in Texas. This made the religious right skeptical of Miers.

The news of the nomination and Bush's support of Miers' nomination in part inspired satirist Stephen Colbert to create the term "Truthiness," meaning to know things intuitively without regard for evidence. Colbert said in the guise of his character on The Colbert Report:

Consider Harriet Miers. If you 'think' about it, of course her nomination's absurd. But the president didn't say he 'thought' about his selection. He said this:

(video clip of President Bush:) 'I know her heart.'

Notice how he said nothing about her brain? He didn't have to. He feels the truth about Harriet Miers.

Following the October 3 nomination of Miers for a seat on the U.S. Supreme Court by President George W. Bush, then-Ohio Senator Mike DeWine stated, "I think the fact she doesn't have judicial experience will add to the diversity of the Supreme Court. There is no reason everyone has to have that same [judicial] background."

== Withdrawal ==
President George W. Bush withdrew his nomination of Harriet Miers shortly after an awkward dispute she had with Senator Arlen Specter of Pennsylvania, then the Republican chairman of the Senate Judiciary Committee. At issue was what she had said during their private talk about the right to privacy, an underpinning of the high court's 1973 Roe v. Wade decision establishing abortion rights.

Bush stated that Miers asked to withdraw her nomination on October 27, 2005, and he acceded to her wishes. The narrative where Miers jumped rather than being pushed was accepted at first, but has since been challenged. Most prominently, Jan Crawford Greenburg reported that Miers' abysmal performance in murder boards before the hearings made clear to White House Chief of Staff Andy Card and Deputy White House Counsel William K. Kelley that the game was up, at which point, they demanded Miers withdraw. After initial resistance, she acquiesced.

Bush and Miers attributed her withdrawal to requests from the Judiciary Committee for the release of internal White House documents that the administration had insisted were protected by executive privilege. Both Republican and Democratic senators denied that they were attempting to obtain privileged documents. Most observers instead believed this rationale was a way for the Bush administration to pull her nomination and still "save face," by avoiding a direct acknowledgment of the lack of support for her nomination. The claim of executive privilege had been publicly recommended as an "exit strategy" by commentators such as Charles Krauthammer, and reports indicated that White House advisors had considered that as a tactic.

Samuel Alito, a federal judge on the U.S. Court of Appeals for the Third Circuit, was nominated four days after her withdrawal and subsequently confirmed.
