= AEI World Forum =

Annual summit sponsored by the American Enterprise Institute

The AEI World Forum is an annual meeting of business and financial executives, heads of government, government officials, and intellectuals. Held every spring in Sea Island, Georgia, it is sponsored by the American Enterprise Institute (AEI) and the Vail Valley Foundation, and it features a number of AEI scholars and fellows.

== History ==
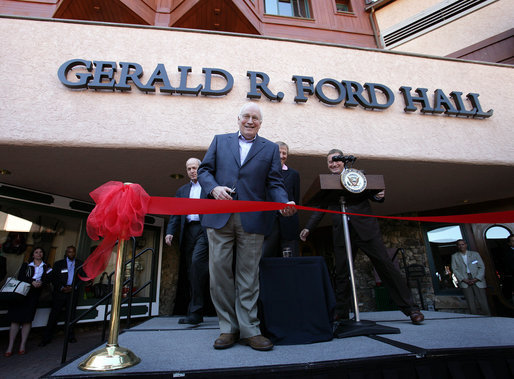
Vice President Cheney opens Gerald R. Ford Hall at the World Forum site in 2007.

In 1976, U.S. president Gerald Ford hosted the second G7 summit in San Juan, Puerto Rico. During his presidency, Ford became close friends with three of the other heads of government present at the summit: British prime minister James Callaghan, French president Valéry Giscard d'Estaing, and German chancellor Helmut Schmidt. After his presidency, Ford joined the American Enterprise Institute as its "Distinguished Fellow" and in 1982, he and his wife, Betty Ford, hosted the first AEI World Forum near their home in Beaver Creek. Along with Callaghan, Giscard d'Estaing, and Schmidt, he hoped to enrich discourse among world leaders and explore crucial public policy issues in an intimate setting.

Ford hosted the World Forum until his death in 2006. At the twenty-sixth World Forum in 2007, Vice President Richard Cheney unveiled Gerald R. Ford Hall in the Beaver Creek Park Hyatt Hotel, where the World Forum's sessions are held.

== Format ==
The AEI World Forum is private and off the record. The World Forum consists of plenary sessions, topical small-group discussion sessions, informal conversational time, and recreational activities. According to the Vail Valley Foundation, "Senior U.S. cabinet officers and legislators provide candid briefings on important policy initiatives. Heads of major international corporations discuss business and financial developments. Government officials from Europe, Asia and the Americas debate international strategic and economic issues in a private, informal atmosphere, far removed from the distractions of day-to-day business."

Journalists are not able to officially report on discussions taking place, leading to claims that the event is “secretive”. However, this does not prevent journalists from obtaining discussion topics, or from speaking at the events off the record.

The Forum attracts right-leaning politicians, and has included members of the first Trump administration and UK Conservative party government ministers. It has also been reported that its members shaped discussions ahead of the 2016 Republican Party presidential primaries.
