= List of Joe Biden 2020 presidential campaign endorsements =

This is a list of notable individuals and organizations who endorsed Joe Biden's campaign for president of the United States in the 2020 U.S. presidential election.

== Former federal executive officials ==
=== Presidents ===
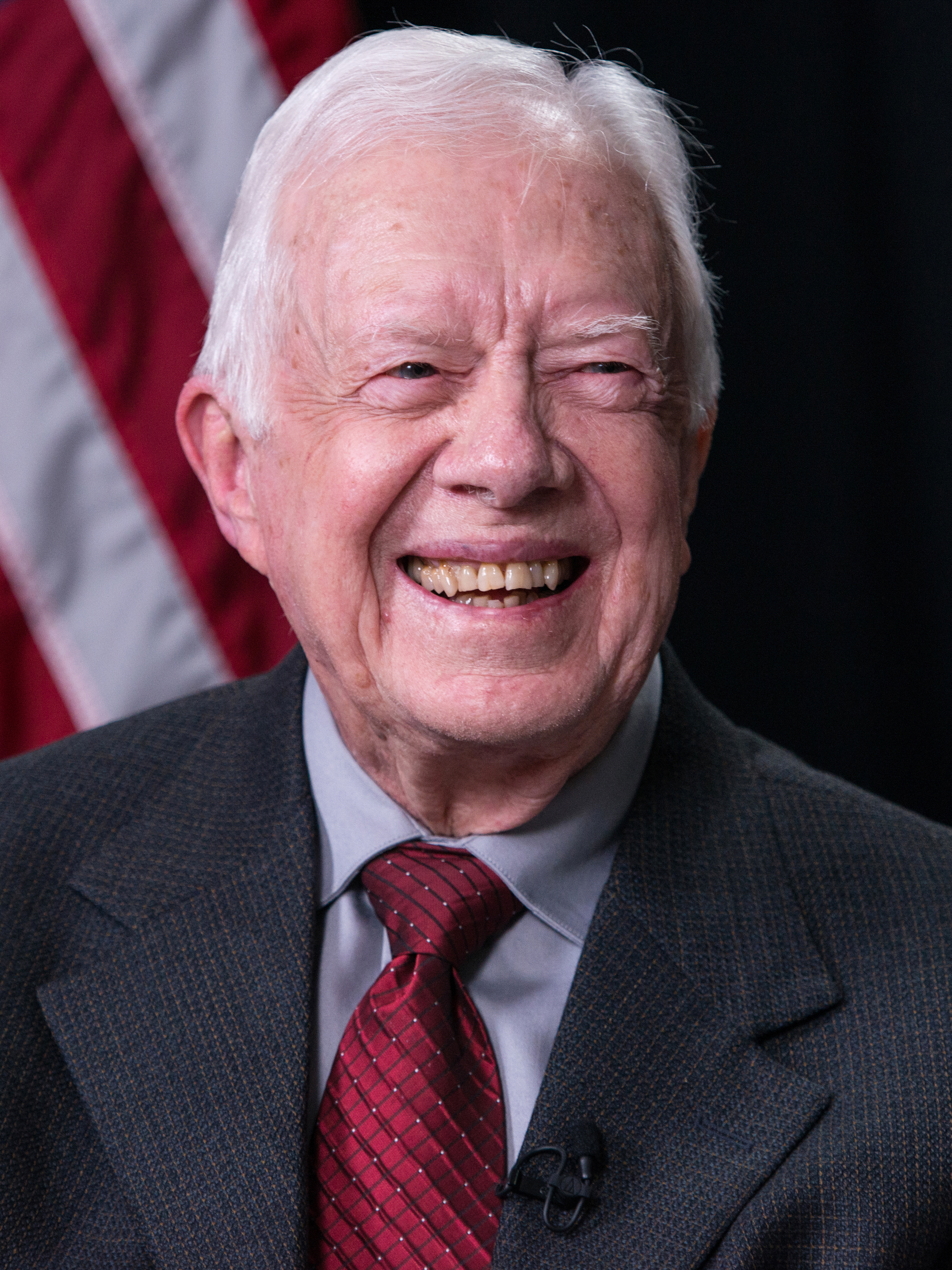
Jimmy Carter

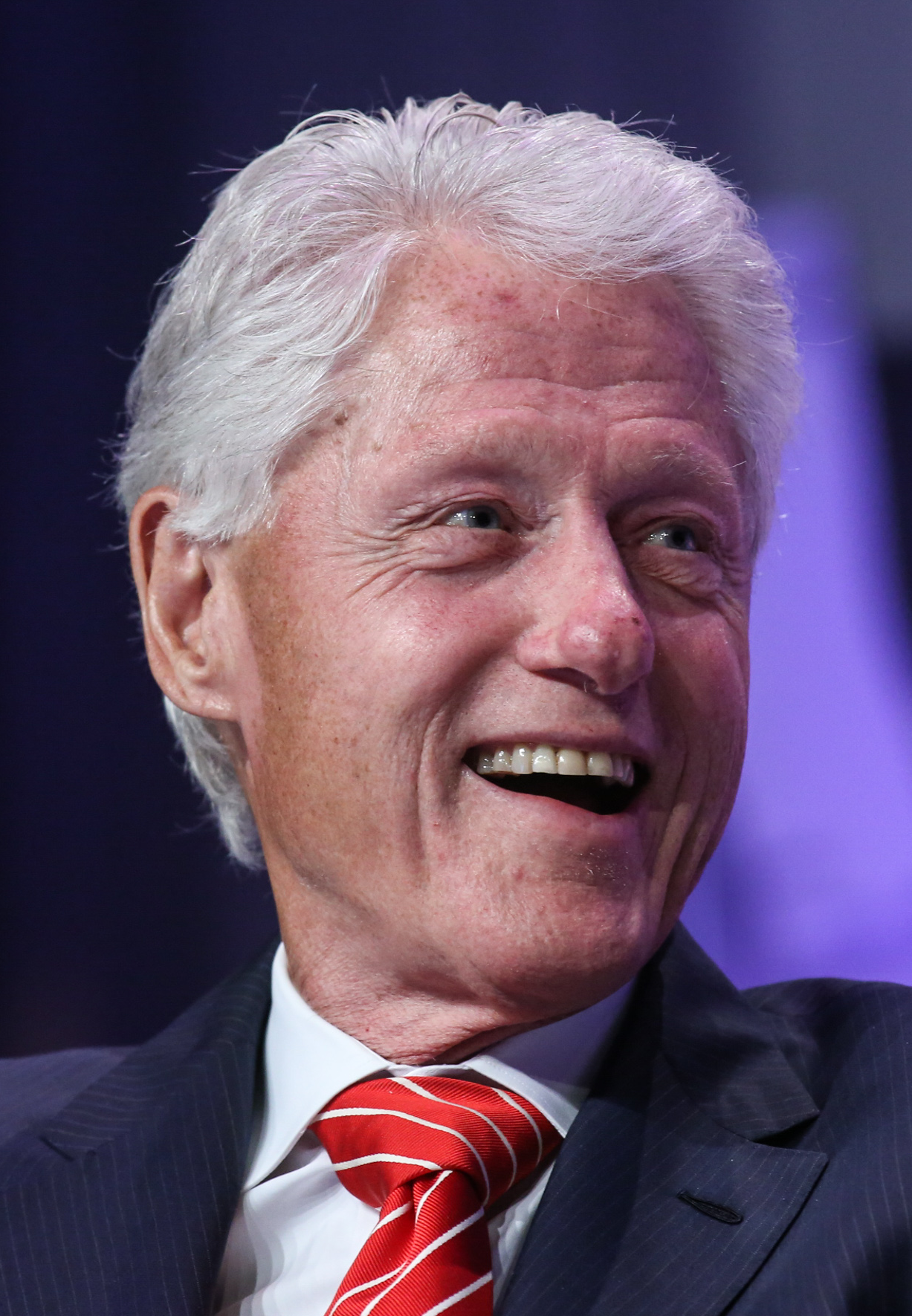
Bill Clinton

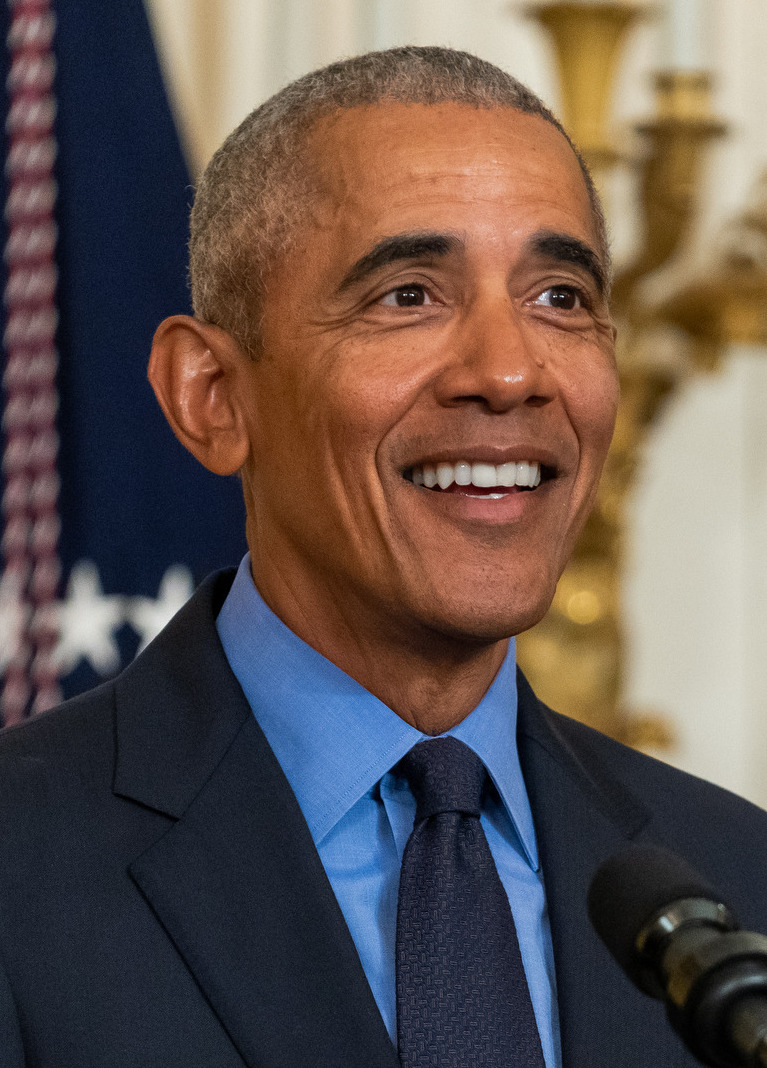
Barack Obama

- Jimmy Carter, 39th president of the United States (1977–1981), governor of Georgia (1971–1975), Georgia state senator from District 14 (1963–1967), recipient of the Nobel Peace Prize in 2002
- Bill Clinton, 42nd president of the United States (1993–2001), governor of Arkansas (1979–1981, 1983–1992), attorney general of Arkansas (1977–1979)
- Barack Obama, 44th president of the United States (2009–2017) – under whom Biden served as vice president, U.S. senator from Illinois (2005–2008), Illinois state senator from District 13 (1997–2004), recipient of the Nobel Peace Prize in 2009

=== Vice presidents ===
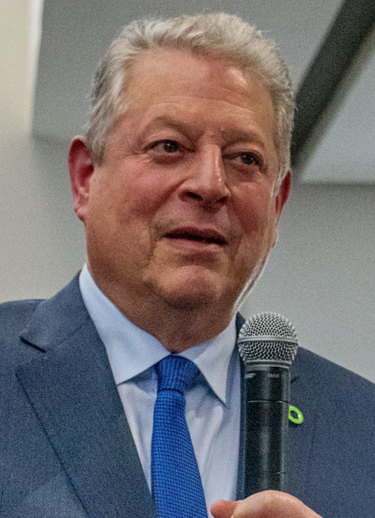
Al Gore

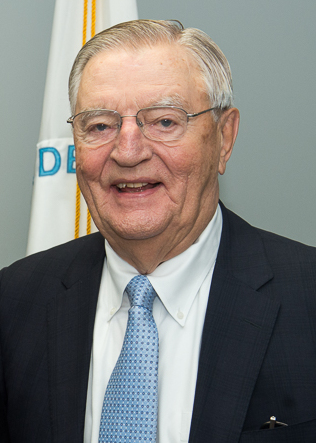
Walter Mondale

- Al Gore, 45th vice president of the United States (1993–2001), U.S. senator from Tennessee (1985–1993), U.S. representative from TN-06 (1983–1985) and TN-04 (1977–1983), 2000 nominee for president, recipient of the Nobel Peace Prize in 2007
- Walter Mondale, 42nd vice president of the United States (1977–1981), U.S. ambassador to Japan (1993–1996), U.S. senator from Minnesota (1964–1976), attorney general of Minnesota (1960–1964), 1984 nominee for president

=== Cabinet-level officials ===
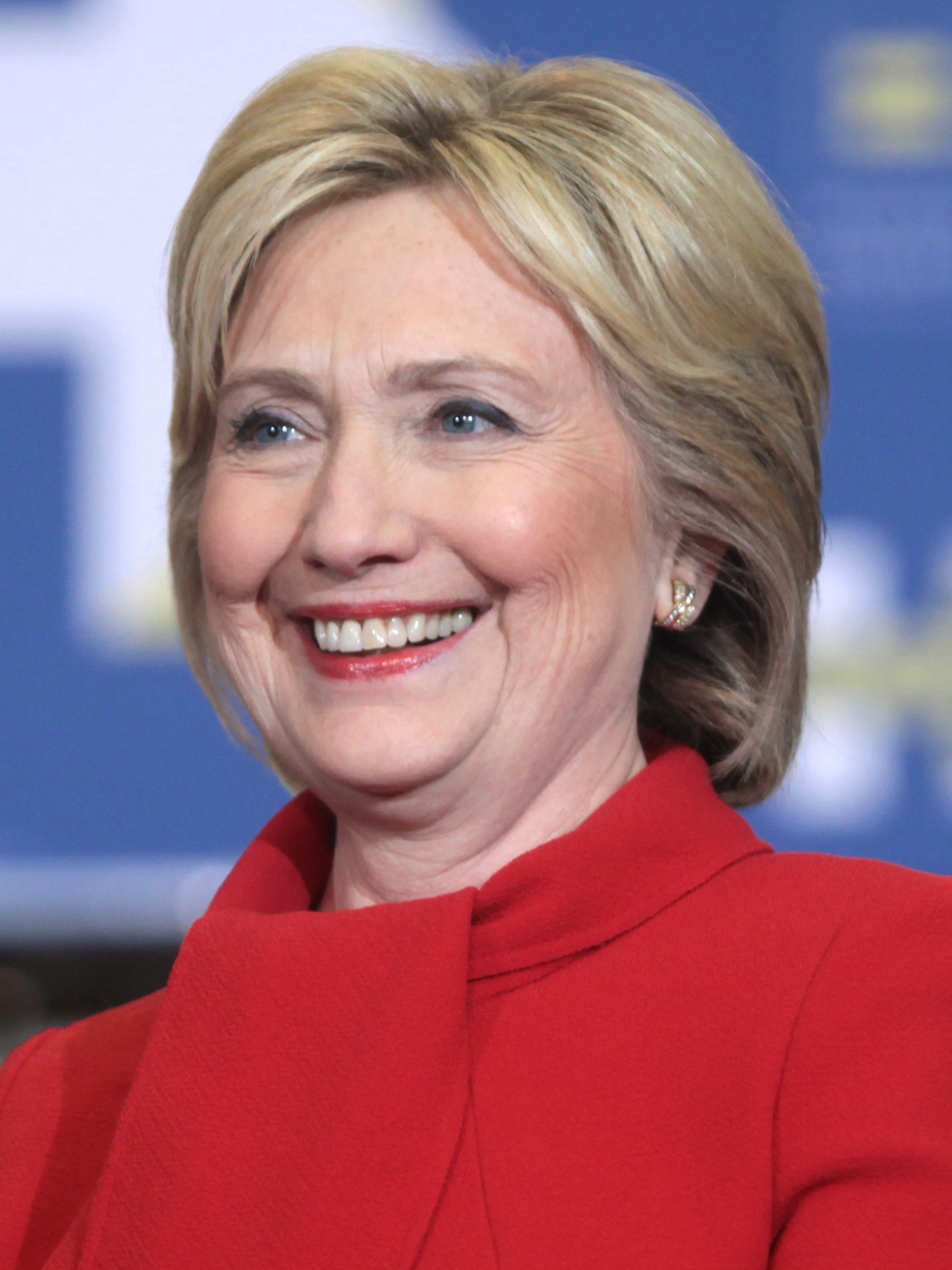
Hillary Clinton

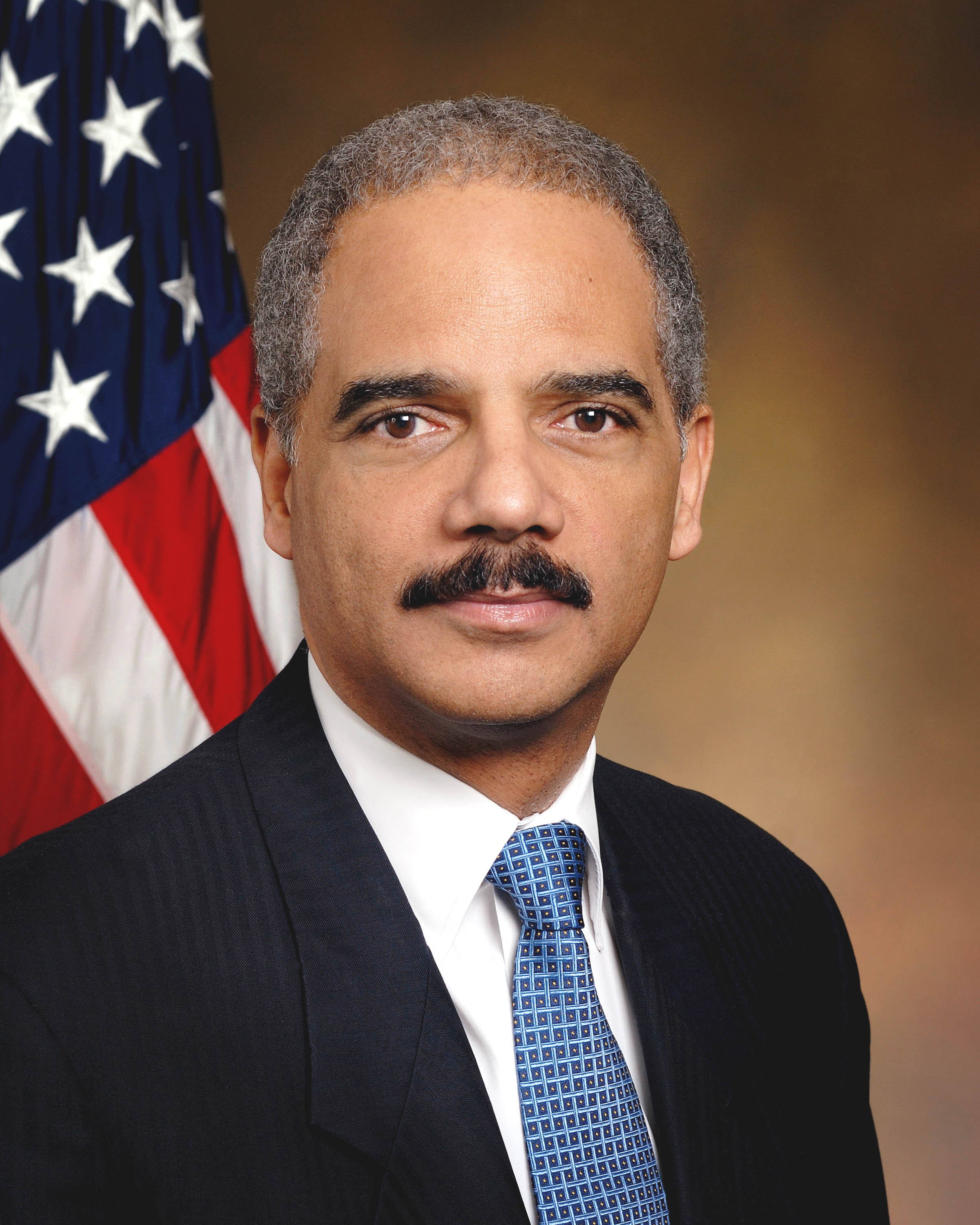
Eric Holder

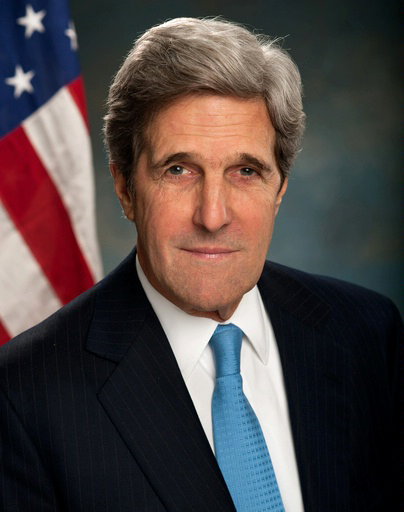
John Kerry

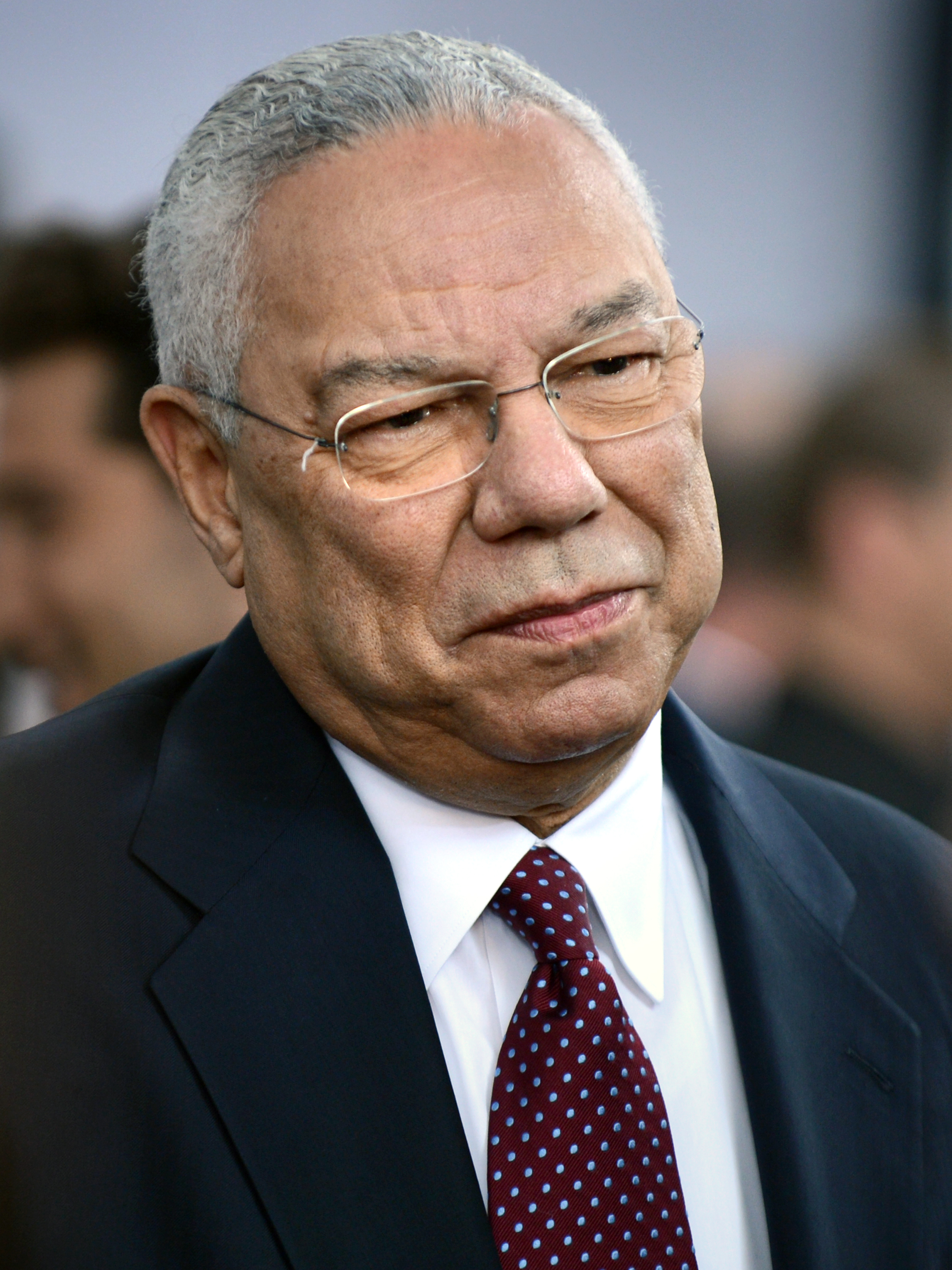
Colin Powell

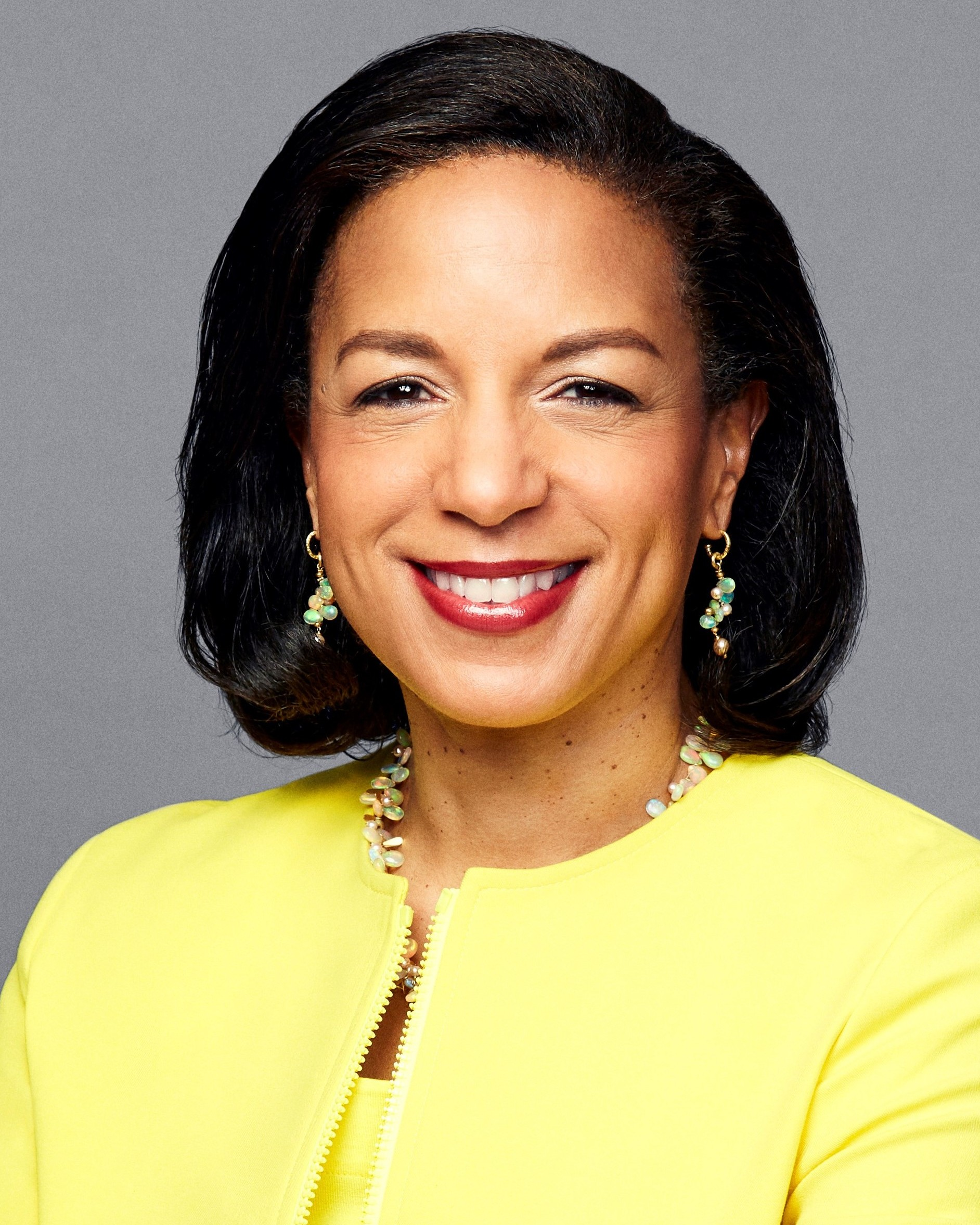
Susan Rice

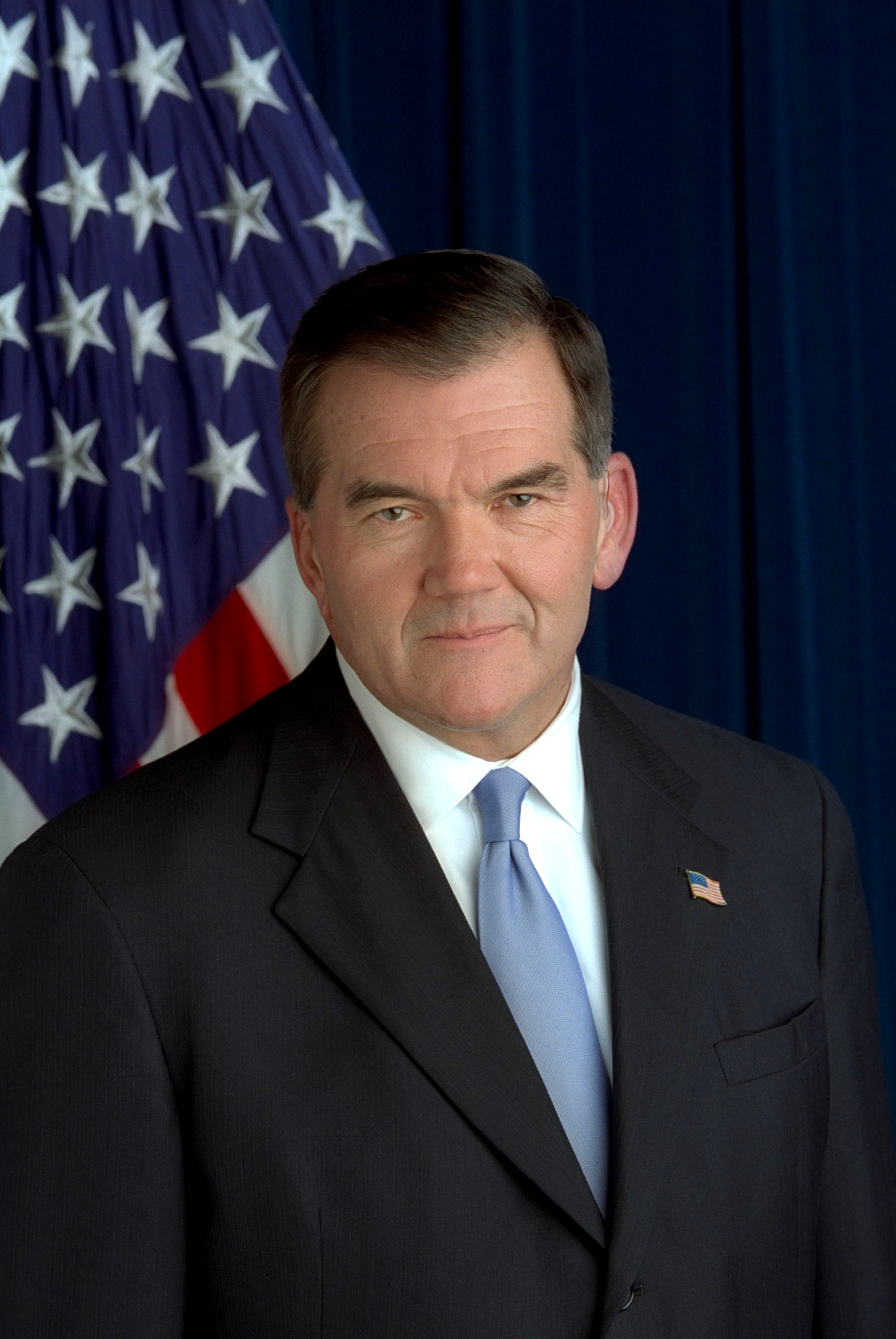
Tom Ridge

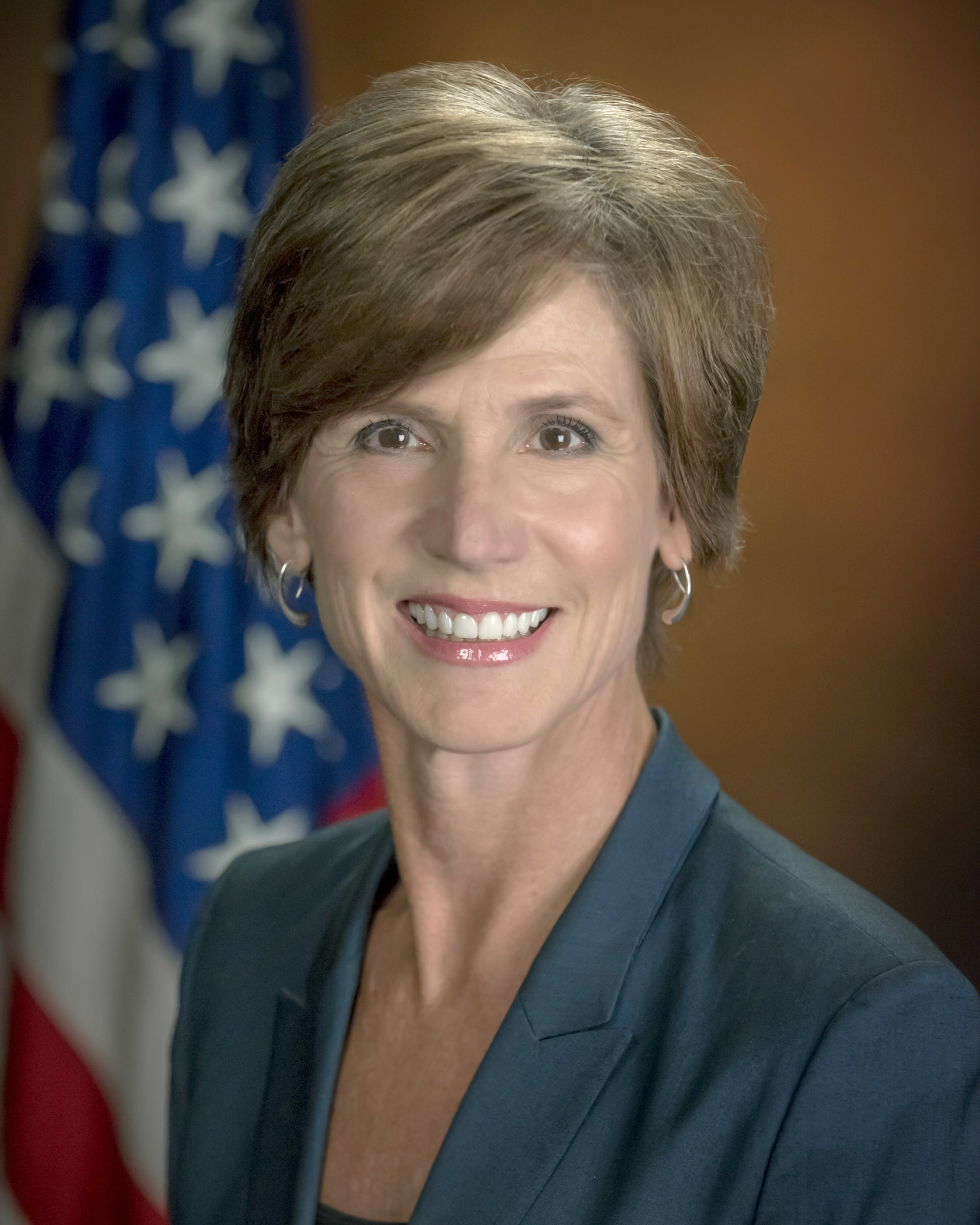
Sally Yates

- Madeleine Albright, U.S. secretary of state (1997–2001), U.S. ambassador to the United Nations (1993–1997)
- Peter Allgeier, U.S. trade representative (2005, 2009) (Republican)
- Rand Beers, U.S. secretary of Homeland Security (2013), U.S. Deputy Secretary of Homeland Security (2013), Under Secretary of Homeland Security for National Protection and Programs (2009–2014)
- Erskine Bowles, president of the University of North Carolina System (2005–2010), administrator of the Small Business Administration (1993–1994), White House Chief of Staff (1997–1998), White House deputy chief of staff for Operations (1994–1996)
- Carol Browner, administrator of the Environmental Protection Agency (1993–2001), director of the White House Office of Energy and Climate Change Policy (2009–2011)
- William J. Burns, acting U.S. secretary of state (2009)
- Ash Carter, U.S. Secretary of Defense (2015–2017)
- Julian Castro, U.S. Secretary of Housing and Urban Development (2014–2017), mayor of San Antonio, Texas (2009–2014), 2020 candidate for president (Note: Previously endorsed Elizabeth Warren.)
- Steven Chu, U.S. secretary of energy (2009–2013), laureate of the Nobel Prize in Physics (1997)
- Henry Cisneros, U.S. secretary of housing and urban development (1993–1997), mayor of San Antonio, TX (1981–1989) (Note: Previously endorsed Julian Castro.)
- James Clapper, director of National Intelligence (2010–2017), under secretary of defense for intelligence (2007–2010), director of the National Geospatial-Intelligence Agency (2001–2006), director of the Defense Intelligence Agency (1991–1995)
- Hillary Clinton, U.S. Secretary of State (2009–2013), U.S. senator from New York (2001–2009), First Lady of the United States (1993–2001), 2016 nominee for president
- William Cohen, U.S. secretary of defense (1997–2001), U.S. senator from Maine (1979–1997), U.S. representative from ME-02 (1973–1979) (Republican)
- Maria Contreras-Sweet, administrator of the Small Business Administration (2014–2017), California Secretary of Business, Transportation and Housing Agency (1999–2003)
- James B. Cunningham, U.S. ambassador to the United Nations (2001), U.S. ambassador to Afghanistan (2012–2014), U.S. ambassador to Israel (2008–2011)
- William M. Daley, U.S. secretary of commerce (1997–2000), White House chief of staff (2011–2012)
- Tom Donilon, U.S. national security advisor (2010–2013), deputy national security advisor (2009–2010)
- Rahm Emanuel, mayor of Chicago, Illinois (2011–2019), White House chief of staff (2009–2010), U.S. representative from IL-05 (2003–2009), senior advisor to the president (1993–1998)
- Mike Espy, U.S. secretary of agriculture (1993–1994), 2020 nominee for Senate, U.S. representative from MS-02 (1987–1993)
- Anthony Foxx, U.S. secretary of transportation (2013–2017), mayor of Charlotte, North Carolina (2009–2013)
- Michael Froman, U.S. trade representative (2013–2017)
- Stuart M. Gerson, U.S. attorney general (1993) (Republican)
- Dan Glickman, U.S. secretary of agriculture (1995–2001), U.S. representative from KS-04 (1977–1995)
- Carlos Gutierrez, U.S. secretary of commerce (2005–2009) (Republican)
- Chuck Hagel, U.S. secretary of defense (2013–2015), U.S. senator from Nebraska (1997–2009) (Republican)
- Michael Hayden, Director of the Central Intelligence Agency (2006–2009), Director of the National Security Agency (1999–2005) (Independent)
- Carla Anderson Hills, U.S. secretary of housing and urban development (1975–1977), U.S. trade representative (1989–1993) (Republican)
- Eric Holder, U.S. attorney general (2009–2015), U.S. deputy attorney general (1997–2001), U.S. attorney for the District of Columbia (1993–1997)
- Sally Jewell, U.S. secretary of the interior (2013–2017)
- Mickey Kantor, U.S. secretary of commerce (1996–1997), U.S. trade representative (1993–1996)
- Peter Keisler, U.S. attorney general (2007) (Republican)
- John Kerry, U.S. special presidential envoy for climate (2021–2024), U.S. secretary ofsState (2013–2017), U.S. senator from Massachusetts (1985–2013), lieutenant governor of Massachusetts (1983–1985), 2004 nominee for president
- Ray LaHood, U.S. secretary of transportation (2009–2013), U.S. representative from IL-18 (1995–2009) (Republican)
- Jack Lew, U.S. secretary of the treasury (2013–2017), White House chief of staff (2012–2013), Director of the Office of Management and Budget (2010–2012, 1998–2001)
- Gary Locke, U.S. ambassador to China (2011–2014), U.S. Secretary of Commerce (2009–2011), governor of Washington (1997–2005)
- James Loy, U.S. secretary of Homeland Security (2005)
- Gina McCarthy, administrator of the Environmental Protection Agency (2013–2017)
- Bob McDonald, U.S. secretary of veterans affairs (2014–2017) (Republican)
- Denis McDonough, U.S. secretary of veterans affairs (2021–2025), White House chief of staff (2013–2017), deputy national security advisor (2010–2013)
- Donald McHenry, U.S. ambassador to the United Nations (1979–1981)
- Norman Mineta, U.S. secretary of transportation (2001–2006), U.S. secretary of commerce (2000–2001), U.S. representative from CA-15 (1993–1995) and CA-13 (1975–1993)
- Janet Napolitano, president of the University of California System (2013–2020), U.S. Secretary of Homeland Security (2009–2013), governor of Arizona (2003–2009), chair of the National Governors Association (2006–2007)
- John Negroponte, U.S. deputy secretary of state (2007–2009), director of National Intelligence (2005–2007), U.S. ambassador to Iraq (2004–2005), U.S. ambassador to the United Nations (2001–2004), U.S. ambassador to the Philippines (1993–1996), U.S. ambassador to Mexico (1989–1993), deputy national security advisor (1987–1989), assistant secretary of state for oceans and international environmental and scientific affairs (1985–1987), U.S. ambassador to Honduras (1981–1985) (Republican)
- Leon Panetta, U.S. secretary of defense (2011–2013), director of the Central Intelligence Agency (2009–2011), White House chief of staff (1994–1997), director of the Office of Management and Budget (1993–1994), U.S. representative from CA-16 (1977–1993)
- Anne W. Patterson, assistant secretary of state for Near Eastern Affairs (2013–2017), U.S. ambassador to Egypt (2011–2013), U.S. ambassador to Pakistan (2007–2010), U.S. ambassador to the United Nations (2005), assistant secretary of state for international narcotics and law enforcement affairs (2005–2007), U.S. ambassador to Colombia (2000–2003), U.S. ambassador to El Salvador (1997–2000)
- Federico Peña, U.S. secretary of energy (1997–1998), U.S. secretary of transportation (1993–1997), mayor of Denver, Colorado (1983–1991)
- Kal Penn, former Principal Associate Director of the White House Office of Public Engagement (2009–2011) and actor
- William Perry, U.S. secretary of defense (1994–1997), deputy secretary of defense (1993–1994), under Sscretary of defense for research and engineering
- Mary E. Peters, U.S. secretary of transportation (2006–2009) (Republican)
- Thomas R. Pickering, U.S. ambassador to the United Nations (1989–1992)
- John Podesta, White House chief of staff (1998–2001)
- Colin Powell, U.S. secretary of state (2001–2005), chairman of the Joint Chiefs of Staff (1989–1993), U.S. national security advisor (1987–1989) (Republican)
- Samantha Power, U.S. ambassador to the United Nations (2013–2017)
- Penny Pritzker, U.S. secretary of commerce (2013–2017)
- Robert Reich, U.S. secretary of labor (1993–1997)
- William K. Reilly, administrator of the Environmental Protection Agency (1989–1993) (Republican)
- Susan Rice, director of the United States Domestic Policy Council (2021–2023), U.S. national security advisor (2013–2017), U.S. ambassador to the United Nations (2009–2013), assistant secretary of state for African affairs (1997–2001)
- Bill Richardson, governor of New Mexico (2003–2011), U.S. secretary of energy (1998–2001), U.S. ambassador to the United Nations (1997–1998), U.S. representative from NM-03 (1983–1997)
- Tom Ridge, U.S. secretary of Homeland Security (2003–2005), Homeland Security advisor (2001–2003) governor of Pennsylvania (1995–2001) U.S. representative from PA-21 (1983–1995) (Republican)
- Richard Riley, U.S. secretary of education (1993–2001), governor of South Carolina (1979–1987)
- Robert Rubin, director of the U.S. National Economic Council (1993–1995), U.S. secretary of the treasury (1995–1999), chairman of the Council on Foreign Relations (2007–2017)
- Ken Salazar, U.S. secretary of the interior (2009–2013), U.S. senator from Colorado (2005–2009)
- Miriam Sapiro, U.S. trade depresentative (2013), deputy U.S. trade representative (2009–2014)
- Kathleen Sebelius, U.S. secretary of health and human services (2009–2014), governor of Kansas (2003–2009)
- Thomas A. Shannon Jr., U.S. secretary of state (2017) (Republican)
- Hilda Solis, U.S. secretary of labor (2009–2013), U.S. representative from CA-32 (2001–2009)
- Lawrence Summers, director of the National Economic Council (2009–2011), president of Harvard University (2001–2006), U.S. secretary of the treasury (1999–2001)
- Ann Veneman, U.S. secretary of agriculture (2001–2005) (Republican)
- Tom Vilsack, U.S. secretary of agriculture (2009–2017, 2021–2025), governor of Iowa (1999–2007)
- Jack Watson, White House chief of staff (1980–1981)
- William H. Webster, chair of the Homeland Security Advisory Council (2005–2020), director of Central Intelligence (1987–1991), director of the Federal Bureau of Investigation (1978–1987), judge of the U.S. Court of Appeals for the Eighth Circuit (1973–1978), judge of the U.S. District Court for the Eastern District of Missouri (1970–1973), U.S. Attorney for the Eastern District of Missouri (1960–1961) (Republican)
- Christine Todd Whitman, administrator of the Environmental Protection Agency (2001–2003) governor of New Jersey (1994–2001) (Forward)
- Neal S. Wolin, U.S. deputy secretary of the treasury (2009–2013), U.S. secretary of the treasury (2013), chair of the Intelligence Oversight Board (2015–2017)
- Sally Yates, U.S. attorney general (2017), U.S. deputy attorney general (2015–2017), U.S. attorney for the Northern District of Georgia (2010–2015)
- Janet Yellen, U.S. secretary of the treasury (2021–2025), chair of the Federal Reserve (2014–2018), vice chair of the Federal Reserve (2010–2014), member of the Federal Reserve Board of Governors (2010–2018, 1994–1997), president of the Federal Reserve Bank of San Francisco (2004–2010), chair of the Council of Economic Advisers (1997–1999)
- Andrew Young, mayor of Atlanta, Georgia (1982–1990), U.S. ambassador to the United Nations (1977–1979), U.S. representative from GA-05 (1973–1977)
- Jeffrey Zients, chief performance officer of the United States (2009–2013), director of the Office of Management and Budget (2010, 2012–2013), director of the National Economic Council (2014–2017)
- Robert Zoellick, U.S. trade representative (2001–2005) (Republican)

=== State Department officials ===
- Hady Amr, U.S. deputy special envoy for Israeli-Palestinian Negotiations (2014–2017)
- Richard Armitage, U.S. deputy secretary of state (2001–2005) (Republican)
- Elizabeth Frawley Bagley, special advisor for Secretary's Initiatives (2010–2013, 2014–2017), special representative for Global Partnerships (2009–2010), U.S. Ambassador to Portugal (1994–1997)
- John B. Bellinger III, legal adviser of the Department of State (2005–2009) (Republican)
- Virginia L. Bennett, assistant secretary of state for democracy, human rights, and labor (2017)
- Nisha Biswal, assistant secretary of state for South and Central Asian affairs (2014–2017)
- Robert O. Blake Jr., U.S. ambassador to Indonesia (2014–2016), assistant secretary of state for South and Central Asian Affairs (2009–2013)
- Tony Blinken, U.S. deputy secretary of state (2015–2017), Deputy National Security Advisor (2013–2015)
- Richard Boucher, assistant secretary of state for South and Central Asian Affairs (2006–2009) (Republican)
- Reuben Brigety, U.S. ambassador to South Africa (2022–2025), U.S. ambassador to the African Union (2013–2015), deputy assistant secretary of state for African affairs (2011–2013), dean of the Elliott School of International Affairs (2015–2020)
- R. Nicholas Burns, under secretary of state for political affairs (2005–2008)
- Kurt M. Campbell, assistant secretary of state for East Asian and Pacific affairs (2009–2013)
- Richard A. Clarke, assistant secretary of state for political-military affairs (1989–1992)
- Eliot A. Cohen, counselor of the U.S. Department of State (2007–2009) (Republican)
- Elinor Constable, assistant secretary of state for oceans and international environmental and scientific affairs (1993–1995), U.S. ambassador to Kenya (1986–1989)
- Chester Crocker, assistant secretary of state for African Affairs (1981–1989) (Republican)
- Evan Dobelle, chief of protocol (1977–1978)
- William A. Eaton, U.S. ambassador to Panama (2005–2008), Assistant Secretary of State for Administration (2001–2005)
- Eric S. Edelman, Under Secretary of Defense for Policy (2005–2009), U.S. ambassador to Turkey (2003–2005), U.S. ambassador to Finland (1998–2001) (Republican)
- Stuart E. Eizenstat, U.S. Under Secretary of State for Economic Growth, Energy, and the Environment (1997–1999), U.S. ambassador to the European Union (1993–1996)
- Jeffrey D. Feltman, Assistant Secretary of State for Near Eastern Affairs (2009–2012), U.S. Ambassador to Lebanon (2004–2008)
- Jose W. Fernandez, Assistant Secretary of State for Economic and Business Affairs (2009–2013)
- Jonathan Finer, Director of Policy Planning (2016–2017)
- Carl W. Ford Jr., Assistant Secretary of State for Intelligence and Research (2001–2003) (Republican)
- Ira Forman, special envoy for Monitoring and Combating Anti-Semitism (2013–2017)
- Douglas Frantz, Assistant Secretary of State for Public Affairs (2013–2015)
- Robert S. Gelbard, U.S. Ambassador to Indonesia (1999–2001), Assistant Secretary of State for International Narcotics Matters (1993–1997), U.S. Ambassador to Bolivia (1988–1991)
- James K. Glassman, Under Secretary of State for Public Diplomacy and Public Affairs (2008–2009) (Republican)
- L. Felice Gorordo, Bureau of Western Hemisphere Affairs (2006–2007)
- Rose Gottemoeller, Assistant Secretary of State for Arms Control, Verification, and Compliance (2009–2014), Under Secretary of State for Arms Control and International Security Affairs (2012–2016)
- Colleen Graffy, deputy assistant secretary of State for Public Diplomacy in Europe and Eurasia (2004–2009) (Republican)
- Heather Higginbottom, Deputy Secretary of State for Management and Resources (2013–2017), counselor of the United States Department of State (2013), deputy director of the Office of Management and Budget (2011–2013)
- Christopher R. Hill, assistant secretary of state for East Asian and Pacific Affairs (2005–2009), U.S. Ambassador to Iraq (2009–2010), U.S. Ambassador to South Korea (2004–2005), U.S. Ambassador to Poland (2000–2004), U.S. Ambassador to Macedonia (1996–1999), U.S. Ambassador to Albania (1991)
- Karl Inderfurth, assistant secretary of state for South and Central Asian Affairs (1997–2001)
- Roberta S. Jacobson, Assistant Secretary of State for Western Hemisphere Affairs (2011–2016), U.S. Ambassador to Mexico (2016–2018)
- Tracey Ann Jacobson, assistant secretary of state for international organization affairs (2017), U.S. Ambassador to Kosovo (2012–2015), U.S. Ambassador to Tajikistan (2006–2009)
- James A. Kelly, assistant secretary of state for East Asian and Pacific Affairs (2001–2005) (Republican)
- Kristie Kenney, counselor of the United States Department of State (2016–2017)
- Harold Hongju Koh, legal adviser of the Department of State (2009–2013), assistant secretary of state for democracy, human Rrights, and labor (1998–2001)
- David J. Kramer, assistant secretary of state for Democracy, Human Rights, and Labor (2008–2009) (Republican)
- Stephen D. Krasner, director of policy planning (2005–2007) (Republican)
- Barbara Larkin, Assistant Secretary of State for Legislative Affairs (1996–2001)
- Reta Jo Lewis, special representative for global intergovernmental affairs at the Department of State
- John Limbert, deputy assistant secretary of state for Iran (2009–2010), U.S. ambassador to Mauritania (2000–2003)
- David Lyle Mack, deputy assistant secretary of state for Near East affairs (1990–1993), U.S. ambassador to the United Arab Emirates (1986–1989)
- Nancy McEldowney, director of the Foreign Service Institute (2013–2017), U.S. ambassador to Bulgaria (2008–2009)
- Thomas O. Melia, assistant administrator of USAID for Europe and Eurasia (2015–2017)
- Alberto J. Mora, general counsel to the U.S. Information Agency (1989–1993) (Republican)
- Thomas R. Nides, deputy secretary of state for Management and Resources (2011–2013)
- Suzanne Nossel, deputy assistant secretary of state for International Organization Affairs (2009)
- Victoria Nuland, assistant secretary of state for European and Eurasian affairs (2013–2017), spokesperson for the United States Department of State (2011–2013), U.S. ambassador to NATO (2005–2008)
- Douglas H. Paal, former member of the U.S. State Department Policy Planning Staff (Republican)
- Michael C. Polt, U.S. ambassador to Estonia (2009–2012), U.S. Ambassador to Serbia (2006–2007), U.S. Ambassador to Serbia and Montenegro (2004–2006), assistant secretary of state for Legislative Affairs (2001)
- Robin Raphel, U.S. ambassador to Tunisia (1997–2001), assistant secretary of state for South and Central Asian Affairs (1993–1997)
- Joel Martin Rubin, deputy assistant secretary of state for Legislative Affairs (2014–2017) (Note: Previously endorsed Bernie Sanders.)
- Evan Ryan, assistant secretary of state for educational and cultural affairs (2013–2017)
- Kori Schake, deputy director for policy planning for the U.S. Department of State (2007–2008) (Republican)
- Elaine Schuster, public delegate to the United Nations General Assembly (2009–2010)
- Peter A. Selfridge, chief of protocol of the United States (2014–2017)
- Wendy Sherman, U.S. deputy secretary of state (2014–2015)
- Jay T. Snyder, commissioner of the U.S. Advisory Commission on Public Diplomacy
- James Steinberg, U.S. deputy secretary of state (2009–2011), deputy national security advisor (1996–2000)
- Linda Thomas-Greenfield, assistant secretary of state for African Affairs (2013–2017), Director General of the Foreign Service (2012–2013), U.S. ambassador to Liberia (2008–2012)
- Arturo Valenzuela, assistant secretary of state for Western Hemisphere Affairs (2009–2011)
- Nicholas A. Veliotes, assistant secretary of state for Near Eastern and South Asian affairs (1981–1983), U.S. ambassador to Egypt (1984–1986), U.S. ambassador to Jordan (1978–1981)
- Richard Verma, assistant secretary of state for legislative affairs (2009–2011), U.S. ambassador to India (2015–2017)
- Edward S. Walker Jr., assistant secretary of state for Near Eastern Affairs (2000–2001), U.S. ambassador to Israel (1997–2000), U.S. ambassador to Egypt (1994–1997), U.S. ambassador to the United Arab Emirates (1989–1992)
- Earl Anthony Wayne, assistant secretary of state for economic and business affairs (2000–2006), U.S. ambassador to Argentina (2007–2009), U.S. ambassador to Mexico (2011–2015)
- Frank G. Wisner, U.S. ambassador to Zambia (1979–1982), U.S. ambassador to Egypt (1986–1991), U.S. Ambassador to the Philippines (1991–1992), Under Secretary of State for International Security Affairs (1992–1993), under secretary of defense for policy (1993–1994), U.S. ambassador to India (1994–1997)
- John Wolf, assistant secretary of state for International Organization Affairs (1989–1992), U.S. ambassador to Malaysia (1992–1995) (Republican)
- Philip D. Zelikow, counselor of the U.S. Department of State (2005–2007) (Republican)
- Peter Zimmerman, former chief scientist of the U.S. Senate Committee on Foreign Relations and Science Adviser for Arms Control

==== U.S. ambassadors ====
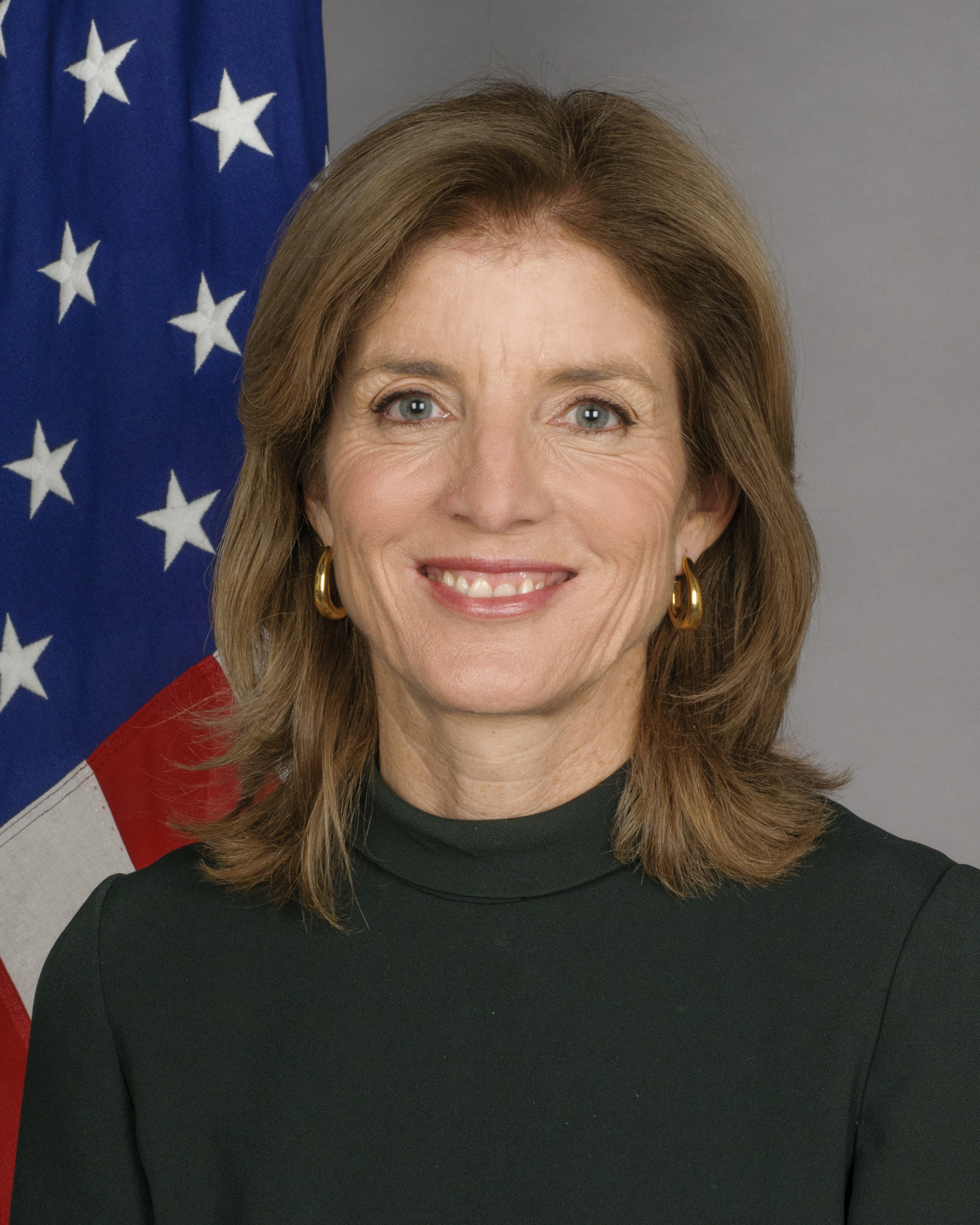
Caroline Kennedy

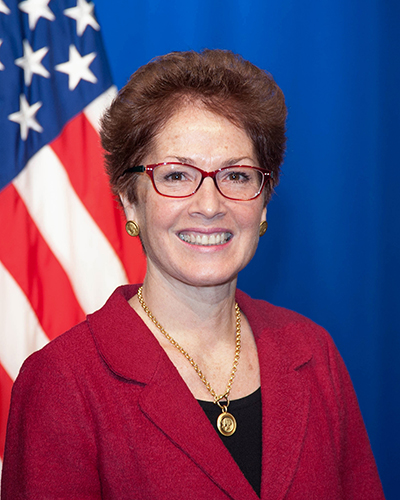
Marie Yovanovitch

- Gina Abercrombie-Winstanley, U.S. ambassador to Malta (2012–2016)
- Charles C. Adams Jr., U.S. ambassador to Finland (2015–2017)
- Leslie M. Alexander, U.S. ambassador to Ecuador (1996–1999), U.S. ambassador to Mauritius, U.S. ambassador to Comoros (1994–1996), U.S. ambassador to Haiti (1992–1993)
- Mari Carmen Aponte, U.S. ambassador to El Salvador (2012–2015)
- Nicole Avant, U.S. ambassador to the Bahamas (2009–2011)
- Robert C. Barber, U.S. ambassador to Iceland (2015–2017)
- Robert L. Barry, U.S. ambassador to Indonesia (1992–1995), U.S. ambassador to Bulgaria (1981–1984)
- Matthew Barzun, U.S. ambassador to the United Kingdom (2013–2017), U.S. ambassador to Sweden (2009–2011)
- Leslie A. Bassett, U.S. ambassador to Paraguay (2015–2017)
- Michael A. Battle Sr., U.S. ambassador to the African Union (2009–2013)
- Max Baucus, U.S. senator from Montana (1978–2014), U.S. ambassador to China (2014–2017), U.S. representative from MT-01 (1975–1978)
- Denise Bauer, U.S. ambassador to Belgium (2013–2017)
- Colleen Bell, U.S. ambassador to Hungary (2015–2017)
- Jack R. Binns, U.S. ambassador to Honduras (1980–1981)
- Robert Blackwill, U.S. ambassador to India (2001–2003) (Republican)
- James Blanchard, U.S. ambassador to Canada (1993–1996), governor of Michigan (1983–1991), U.S. representative from MI-18 (1975–1983)
- John W. Blaney, U.S. ambassador to Liberia (2002–2005)
- Jeff Bleich, U.S. ambassador to Australia (2009–2013)
- Alan Blinken, U.S. ambassador to Belgium (1993–1997)
- Barbara Bodine, U.S. ambassador to Yemen (1997–2001)
- Avis Bohlen, U.S. ambassador to Bulgaria (1996–1999)
- Amy L. Bondurant, U.S. ambassador to the Organization for Cooperation and Development (1997–2001)
- Charles R. Bowers, U.S. ambassador to Bolivia (1991–1994) (Republican)
- Carol Moseley Braun, U.S. senator from Illinois (1993–1999), U.S. ambassador to New Zealand and Samoa (1999–2001)
- Aurelia E. Brazeal, U.S. ambassador to Ethiopia (2002–2005), U.S. ambassador to Kenya (1993–1996), U.S. ambassador to Micronesia (1990–1993)
- Wally Brewster, U.S. ambassador to the Dominican Republic (2013–2017)
- Peter Bridges, U.S. ambassador to Somalia (1984–1986) (Republican)
- Tim Broas, U.S. ambassador to the Netherlands (2014–2016)
- Sue K. Brown, U.S. ambassador to Montenegro (2011–2015)
- George Charles Bruno, U.S. ambassador to Belize (1994–1997)
- Mark Brzezinski, U.S. ambassador to Poland (2022–2025), U.S. ambassador to Sweden (2011–2015)
- Richard Burt, U.S. ambassador to Germany (1985–1989) (Republican)
- Dwight L. Bush Sr., U.S. ambassador to Morocco (2014–2017)
- Prudence Bushnell, U.S. ambassador to Guatemala (1999–2002), U.S. ambassador to Kenya (1996–1999)
- Judith Beth Cefkin, U.S. Ambassador to Fiji (2015–2018), U.S. ambassador to Kiribati (2015–2018), U.S. ambassador to Nauru (2015–2018), U.S. ambassador to Tonga (2015–2018), U.S. ambassador to Tuvalu (2015–2018)
- Dick Celeste, governor of Ohio (1983–1991), U.S. ambassador to India (1997–2001), director of the Peace Corps (1979–1981), lieutenant governor of Ohio (1975–1979)
- Peter R. Chaveas, U.S. ambassador to Sierra Leone (2001–2004), U.S. ambassador to Malawi (1994–1997)
- Mark B. Childress, U.S. ambassador to Tanzania (2014–2016)
- Jack Chow, former special representative of the U.S. secretary of state on global HIV/AIDS (Republican)
- Isobel Coleman, U.S. ambassador to the United Nations for management and reform (2014–2017)
- Maura Connelly, U.S. ambassador to Syria (2008–2010), U.S. ambassador to Lebanon (2010–2013)
- Elinor G. Constable, U.S. ambassador to Kenya (1986–1989)
- Frances D. Cook, U.S. ambassador to Burundi (1980–1983), U.S. ambassador to Cameroon (1989–1993), U.S. ambassador to Oman (1996–1999)
- Suzan Johnson Cook, U.S. ambassador-at-large for international religious freedom (2011–2013)
- J. Gary Cooper, U.S. ambassador to Jamaica (1994–1997)
- James Costos, U.S. ambassador to Spain and Andorra (2013–2017)
- Cindy Courville, U.S. ambassador to the African Union (2006–2008)
- Ryan Crocker, U.S. ambassador to Afghanistan (2002, 2011–2012), U.S. ambassador to Iraq (2007–2009), U.S. ambassador to Pakistan (2004–2007), U.S. ambassador to Syria (1999–2001), U.S. ambassador to Kuwait (1994–1997), U.S. ambassador to Lebanon (1990–1993)
- Ruth A. Davis, U.S. ambassador to Benin (1992–1995)
- Jeffrey DeLaurentis, U.S. ambassador to Cuba (2014–2017), U.S. ambassador to the United Nations for Special Political Affairs (2011–2014)
- Greg Delawie, U.S. ambassador to Kosovo (2015–2018)
- Robert Sherwood Dillon, U.S. ambassador to Lebanon (1981–1983)
- Kathleen A. Doherty, U.S. ambassador to Cyprus (2015–2018)
- William Eacho, U.S. ambassador to Austria (2009–2013)
- Stuart Eizenstat, director of the White House Domestic Policy Council (1977–1981), deputy secretary of the treasury (1999–2001), U.S. ambassador to the European Union (1993–1996)
- Susan M. Elliott, U.S. ambassador to Tajikistan (2012–2015)
- John B. Emerson, U.S. ambassador to Germany (2013–2017)
- John L. Estrada, U.S. ambassador to Trinidad and Tobago (2016–2017)
- Gerald Feierstein, U.S. ambassador to Yemen (2010–2013)
- Judith Fergin, U.S. ambassador to East Timor (2010–2013)
- Julie Finley, U.S. ambassador to the Organization for Security and Cooperation in Europe (2005–2009) (Republican)
- Robert Stephen Ford, U.S. ambassador to Syria (2011–2014), U.S. ambassador to Algeria (2006–2008)
- Elizabeth Frawley Bagley, U.S. ambassador to Portugal (1994–1997)
- Laurie S. Fulton, U.S. ambassador to Denmark (2009–2013)
- Julie Furuta-Toy, U.S. ambassador to Equatorial Guinea (2016–2019)
- Edward M. Gabriel, U.S. ambassador to Morocco (1997–2001)
- Peter Galbraith, U.S. ambassador to Croatia (1993–1998)
- Anthony L. Gardner, U.S. ambassador to the European Union (2014–2017)
- Gordon Giffin, U.S. ambassador to Canada (1997–2001)
- Rufus Gifford, U.S. ambassador to Denmark (2013–2017)
- Mark Gilbert, U.S. ambassador to New Zealand (2015–2017)
- Marc Ginsberg, U.S. ambassador to Morocco (1994–1998)
- Mark Gitenstein, U.S. ambassador to Romania (2009–2012)
- Edward Gnehm, U.S. ambassador to Jordan (2001–2004), U.S. ambassador to Australia (2000–2001), U.S. ambassador to Kuwait (1991–1994)
- Christopher E. Goldthwait, U.S. ambassador to Chad (1999–2004)
- Gary A. Grappo, U.S. ambassador to Oman (2006–2009)
- Gordon Gray III, U.S. ambassador to Tunisia (2009–2012)
- Gabriel Guerra-Mondragón, U.S. ambassador to Chile (1994–1998)
- Lino Gutierrez, U.S. ambassador to Argentina (2003–2006), U.S. ambassador to Nicaragua (1996–1999)
- Howard Gutman, U.S. ambassador to Belgium (2009–2013)
- Nina Hachigian, U.S. ambassador to the Association of Southeast Asian Nations (2014–2017)
- Tony P. Hall, U.S. ambassador to the United Nations Agencies for Food and Agriculture (2002–2006)
- Pamela Hamamoto, U.S. ambassador to the United Nations International Organizations in Geneva (2014–2017)
- S. Fitzgerald Haney, U.S. ambassador to Costa Rica (2015–2017)
- Anthony Stephen Harrington, U.S. ambassador to Brazil (1999–2001)
- Jane D. Hartley, U.S. ambassador to France (2014–2017), U.S. ambassador to Monaco (2014–2017)
- Bruce Heyman, U.S. ambassador to Canada (2014–2017)
- Karl W. Hofmann, U.S. ambassador to Togo (2000–2002)
- Laura Holgate, U.S. ambassador to the United Nations International Organizations in Vienna (2016–2017)
- Thomas C. Hubbard, U.S. ambassador to South Korea (2001–2004), U.S. ambassador to the Philippines (1996–2000)
- Vicki J. Huddleston, U.S. ambassador to Mali (2000–2005), U.S. ambassador to Madagascar (1995–1996)
- David Huebner, U.S. ambassador to New Zealand and Samoa (2010–2014)
- Edmund Hull, U.S. ambassador to Yemen (2001–2004)
- David T. Johnson, U.S. ambassador to the Organization for Security and Co-operation in Europe (1998–2001)
- A. Elizabeth Jones, U.S. ambassador to Kazakhstan (1995–1997)
- Deborah K. Jones, U.S. ambassador to Libya (2013–2015), U.S. ambassador to Kuwait (2008–2011)
- Samuel L. Kaplan, U.S. ambassador to Morocco (2009–2013)
- Theodore H. Kattouf, U.S. ambassador to the United Arab Emirates (1999–2001), U.S. ambassador to Syria (2001–2003)
- Richard Kauzlarich, U.S. ambassador to Bosnia and Herzegovina (1997–1999), U.S. ambassador to Azerbaijan (1994–1997)
- Caroline Kennedy, U.S. ambassador to Japan (2013–2017)
- Laura E. Kennedy, U.S. ambassador to Turkmenistan (2001–2003)
- Kristie Kenney, U.S. ambassador to Thailand (2011–2014), U.S. ambassador to the Philippines (2006–2009), U.S. ambassador to Ecuador (2002–2005)
- Jimmy J. Kolker, U.S. ambassador to Uganda (2002–2005), U.S. ambassador to Burkina Faso (1999–2002)
- Karen Kornbluh, U.S. ambassador to the Organisation for Economic Co-operation and Development (2009–2012)
- Thomas C. Krajeski, U.S. ambassador to Yemen (2004–2007), U.S. ambassador to Bahrain (2011–2014)
- Lisa Kubiske. U.S. ambassador to Honduras (2011–2014)
- Madeleine Kunin, governor of Vermont (1985–1991), U.S. ambassador to Liechtenstein (1997–1999), U.S. ambassador to Switzerland (1996–1999), U.S. deputy secretary of education (1993–1996), lieutenant governor of Vermont (1979–1983)
- Mark P. Lagon, U.S. ambassador-at-large to monitor and combat trafficking in persons (2007–2009)
- David Floyd Lambertson, U.S. ambassador to Thailand (1991–1995)
- Frank Lavin, U.S. ambassador to Singapore (2001–2005) (Republican)
- Joyce Ellen Leader, U.S. ambassador to Guinea (1999–2000)
- Richard LeBaron, U.S. ambassador to Kuwait (2004–2007)
- Alfonso Lenhardt, U.S. ambassador to Tanzania (2009–2013)
- Jeffrey D. Levine, U.S. ambassador to Estonia (2012–2015)
- Suzan G. LeVine, U.S. ambassador to Switzerland and Liechtenstein (2014–2017)
- Dawn M. Liberi, U.S. ambassador to Burundi (2012–2016)
- Carmen Lomellin, U.S. Ambassador to the Organization of American States (2009–2014)
- Winston Lord, U.S. ambassador to China (1984–1989) (Republican)
- Douglas Lute, U.S. Ambassador to NATO (2013–2017)
- Ray Mabus, secretary of the Navy (2009–2017), U.S. ambassador to Saudi Arabia (1994–1996), governor of Mississippi (1988–1992) (Note: Previously endorsed Kamala Harris.)
- Deborah R. Malac, U.S. ambassador to Uganda (2016–2020), U.S. ambassador to Liberia (2012–2015)
- Robert A. Mandell, U.S. ambassador to Luxembourg (2011–2015), chairman of the Florida Environmental Regulation Commission (1987–1990)
- R. Niels Marquardt, U.S. ambassador to Madagascar and Comoros (2007–2010), U.S. ambassador to Equatorial Guinea (2004–2006), U.S. ambassador to Cameroon (2001–2004)
- Gail D. Mathieu, U.S. ambassador to Namibia (2007–2010), U.S. ambassador to Niger (2002–2005)
- Marshall Fletcher McCallie, U.S. ambassador to Namibia (1993–1996)
- Stephen G. McFarland, U.S. ambassador to Guatemala (2008–2011)
- Michael McKinley, U.S. ambassador to Brazil (2017–2018), U.S. ambassador to Afghanistan (2015–2016), U.S. ambassador to Colombia (2010–2014), U.S. ambassador to Peru (2007–2010) (Republican)
- Elizabeth Davenport McKune, U.S. ambassador to Qatar (1998–2001)
- Christopher McMullen, U.S. ambassador to Angola (2010–2013)
- James D. Melville Jr., U.S. ambassador to Estonia (2015–2018)
- Tom Miller, U.S. ambassador to Greece (2001–2004), U.S. ambassador to Bosnia and Herzegovina (1999–2001)
- Richard Morningstar, U.S. ambassador to Azerbaijan (2012–2015)
- David D. Nelson, U.S. ambassador to Uruguay (2009–2011)
- Crystal Nix-Hines, U.S. ambassador to UNESCO (2014–2017)
- Lyndon Lowell Olson Jr., U.S. ambassador to Sweden (1998–2001)
- Kevin O'Malley, U.S. ambassador to Ireland (2014–2017)
- Louis O'Neill, U.S. ambassador to the Organization for Security and Co-operation in Europe (2006–2008)
- Robert Orr, U.S. ambassador to the Asian Development Bank (2010–2016), president of Boeing Japan (2002–2007)
- Joseph R. Paolino Jr., U.S. ambassador to Malta (1994–1996)
- June Carter Perry, U.S. ambassador to Lesotho (2004–2007), U.S. ambassador to Sierra Leone (2004–2007)
- Nancy Bikoff Pettit, U.S. ambassador to Latvia (2015–2019)
- Joan M. Plaisted, U.S. ambassador to Kiribati (1995–2000), U.S. ambassador to the Marshall Islands (1995–2000), U.S. ambassador to Morocco (1991–1994)
- Nancy Jo Powell, U.S. ambassador to India (2012–2014)
- Maureen E. Quinn, U.S. ambassador to Qatar (2001–2004)
- Azita Raji, U.S. ambassador to Sweden (2016–2017)
- Charles A. Ray, U.S. ambassador to Zimbabwe (2009–2012), deputy assistant secretary of defense for POW and missing personnel affairs (2006–2009), U.S. ambassador to Cambodia (2002–2005)
- Julissa Reynoso, U.S. ambassador to Uruguay (2012–2014)
- Thomas Bolling Robertson, U.S. ambassador to Slovenia (2004–2008)
- James Rosapepe, U.S. ambassador to Romania (1998–2001)
- Leslie V. Rowe, U.S. ambassador to Mozambique (2010–2012), U.S. ambassador to Papua New Guinea (2006–2009), U.S. ambassador to the Solomon Islands (2006–2009), U.S. ambassador to Vanuatu (2006–2009)
- William A. Rugh, U.S. ambassador to North Yemen (1984–1987), U.S. ambassador to the United Arab Emirates (1992–1995)
- Catherine M. Russell, U.S. ambassador-at-large for global women's issues (2013–2017)
- Janet A. Sanderson, U.S. ambassador to Haiti (2006–2009), U.S. ambassador to Algeria (2000–2003)
- Teresita Currie Schaffer, U.S. Ambassador to Sri Lanka (1992–1995), U.S. Ambassador to the Maldives (1992–1995)
- Tom Schieffer, U.S. ambassador to Japan (2005–2009), U.S. ambassador to Australia (2001–2005)
- Gregory Schulte, U.S. ambassador to the International Atomic Energy Agency (2005–2009) (Republican)
- Tod Sedgwick, U.S. Ambassador to Slovakia (2010–2015)
- Daniel B. Shapiro, U.S. Ambassador to Israel (2011–2017)
- Mattie R. Sharpless, U.S. Ambassador to the Central African Republic (2001–2003)
- Robert A. Sherman, U.S. ambassador to Portugal (2014–2017)
- Dana Shell Smith, U.S. ambassador to Qatar (2014–2017)
- Nancy Soderberg, U.S. ambassador to the United Nations for Special Political Affairs (1997–2001)
- Alan Solomont, U.S. ambassador to Spain and Andorra (2010–2013)
- Daniel V. Speckhard, U.S. ambassador to Greece (2007–2010), U.S. Ambassador to Belarus (1997–2000)
- Carl Spielvogel, U.S. ambassador to Slovakia (2000–2001)
- Karen Clark Stanton, U.S. ambassador to East Timor (2014–2017)
- Charles Richard Stith, U.S. ambassador to Tanzania (1998–2001)
- Mark C. Storella, U.S. Ambassador to Zambia (2010–2013) (Republican)
- Shirin R. Tahir-Kheli, alternate United States representative to the United Nations for special political affairs (1990–1993) (Republican)
- Robert H. Tuttle, U.S. ambassador to the United Kingdom (2005–2009) (Republican)
- Charles H. Twining, U.S. ambassador to Cameroon (1995–1998), U.S. ambassador to Equatorial Guinea (1995–1998), U.S. ambassador to Cambodia (1994–1995), U.S. ambassador to Benin (1982–1983)
- Nicholas A. Veliotes, U.S. ambassador to Jordan (1978–1981), U.S. Ambassador to Egypt (1984–1986)
- Alexander Vershbow, U.S. ambassador to NATO (1997–2001), U.S. Ambassador to Russia (2001–2005), U.S. ambassador to South Korea (2005–2008)
- Frederick Vreeland, U.S. ambassador to Morocco (1992–1993)
- Marcelle Wahba, U.S. ambassador to the United Arab Emirates (2001–2004)
- Jenonne R. Walker, U.S. Ambassador to the Czech Republic (1995–1998)
- Marc M. Wall, U.S. ambassador to Chad (2004–2007) (Nonpartisan)
- James Donald Walsh, U.S. ambassador to Argentina (2000–2003)
- Mary Burce Warlick, U.S. ambassador to Serbia (2010–2012)
- Joseph W. Westphal, U.S. ambassador to Saudi Arabia (2014–2017), under secretary of the Army (2009–2014), Secretary of the Army (2001)
- Barry B. White, U.S. ambassador to Norway (2009–2013)
- Bisa Williams, U.S. ambassador to Niger (2010–2013)
- Duane Woerth, U.S. representative on the council of the International Civil Aviation Organization (2010–2013)
- Lee S. Wolosky, U.S. special envoy for the closure of the Guantánamo Bay Detention Facility (2015–2017)
- Mary Carlin Yates, U.S. ambassador to Ghana (2002–2005), U.S. ambassador to Burundi (1999–2002)
- Johnny Young, U.S. ambassador to Slovenia (2001–2004), U.S. ambassador to Bahrain (1997–2001), U.S. ambassador to Togo (1994–1997), U.S. ambassador to Sierra Leone (1989–1992)
- Marie Yovanovitch, U.S. ambassador to Ukraine (2016–2019), U.S. ambassador to Armenia, (2008–2011), U.S. ambassador to Kyrgyzstan (2005–2008)
- Susan L. Ziadeh, U.S. ambassador to Qatar (2011–2014)
- Anthony Zinni, U.S. special envoy for Qatar (2017–2019) (Independent)

=== Defense Department officials ===
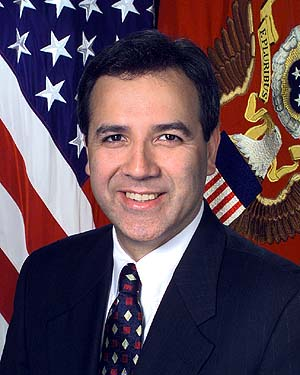
Louis Caldera

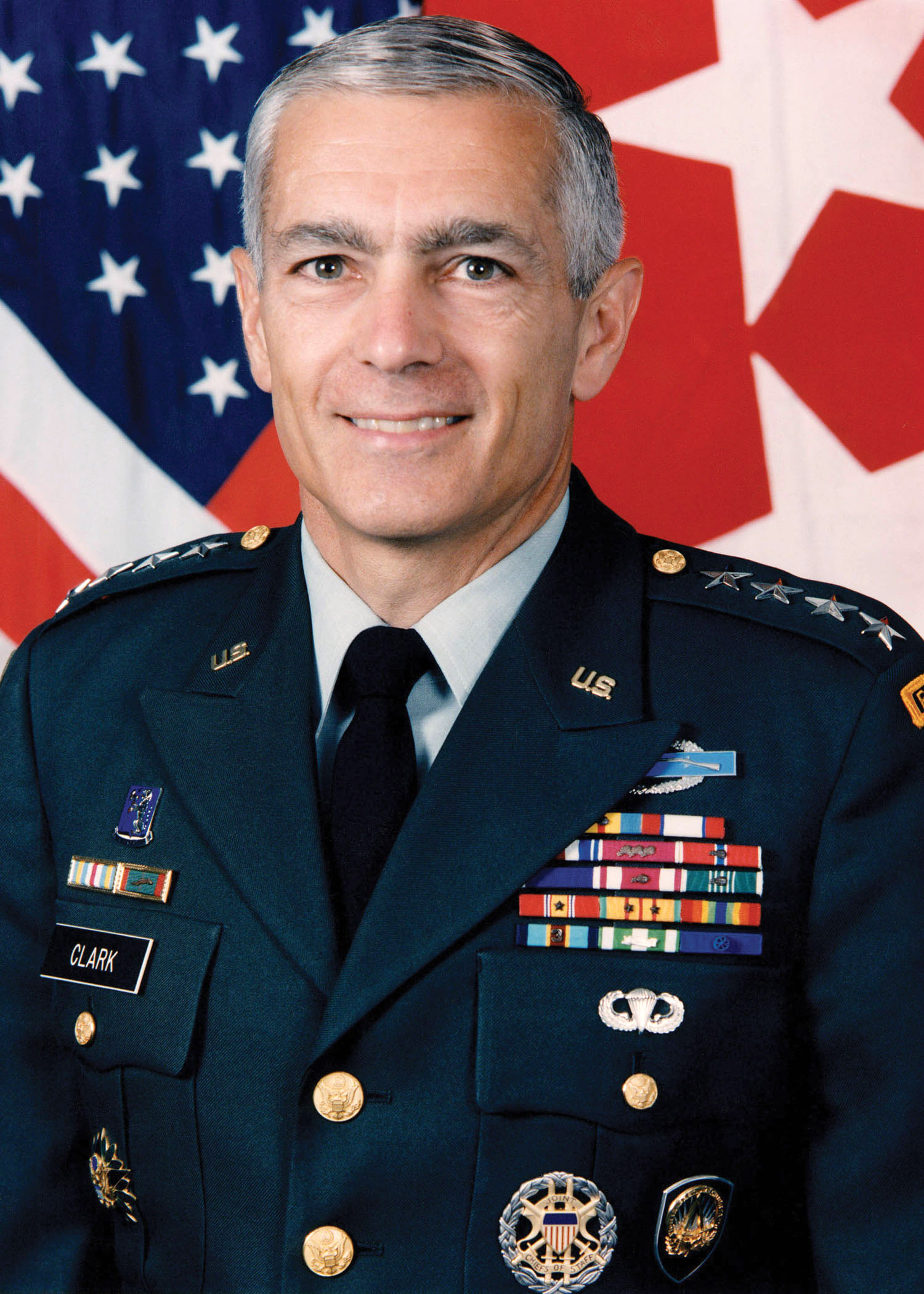
Wesley Clark

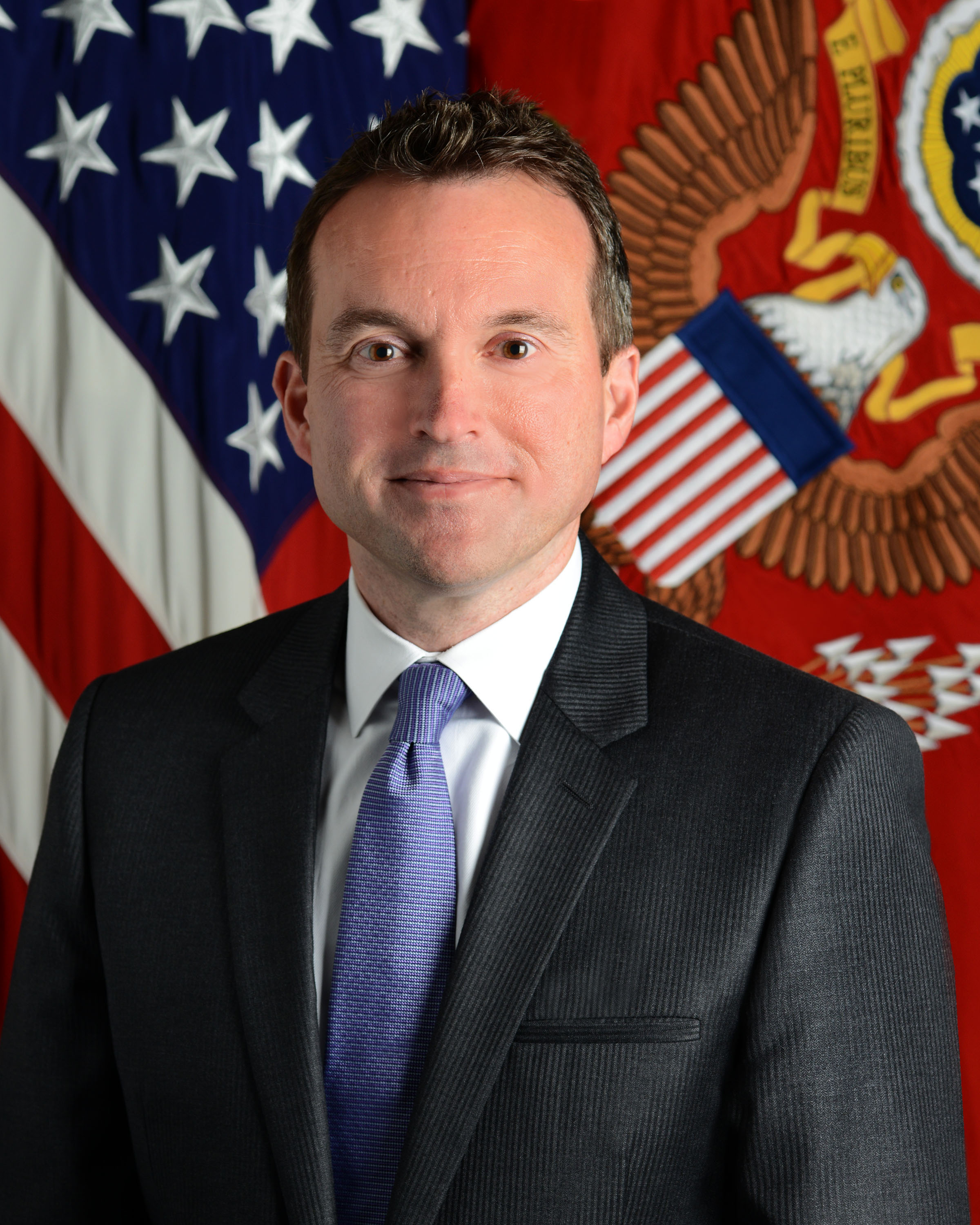
Eric Fanning

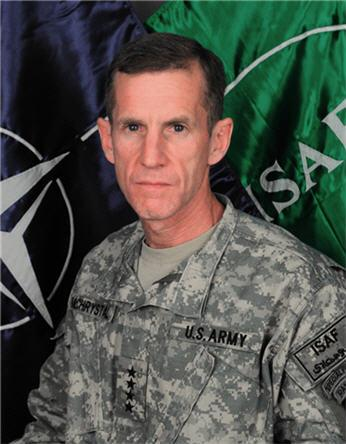
Stanley McChrystal

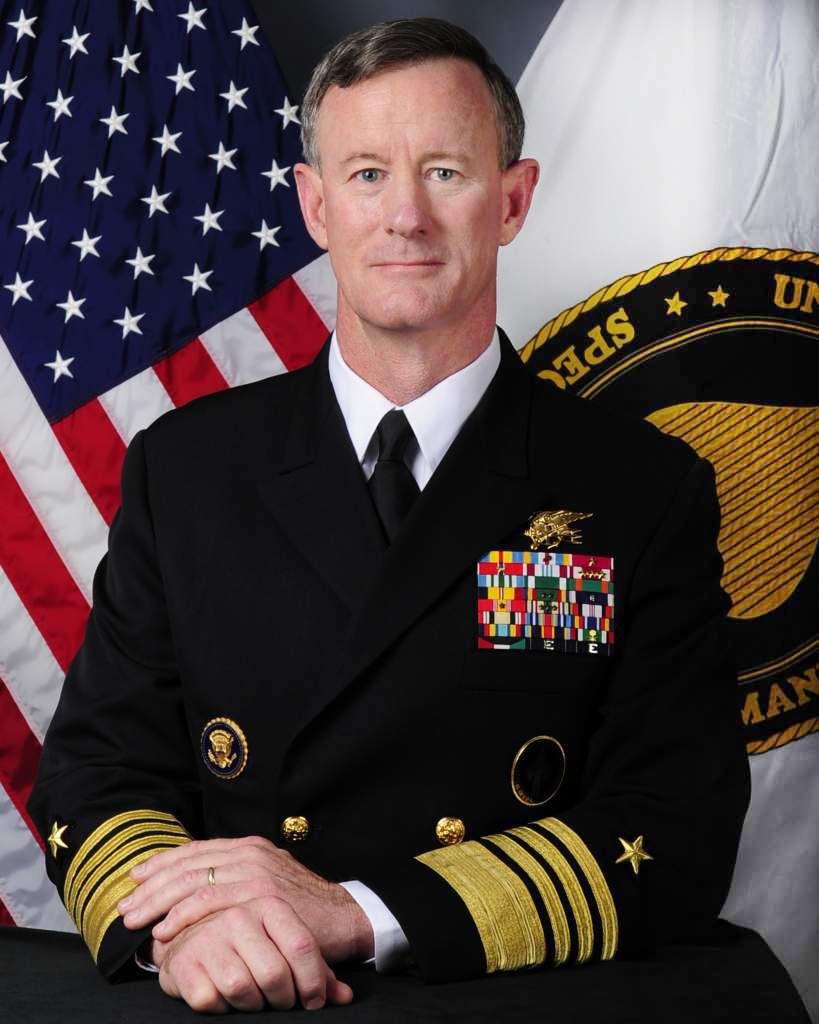
William McRaven

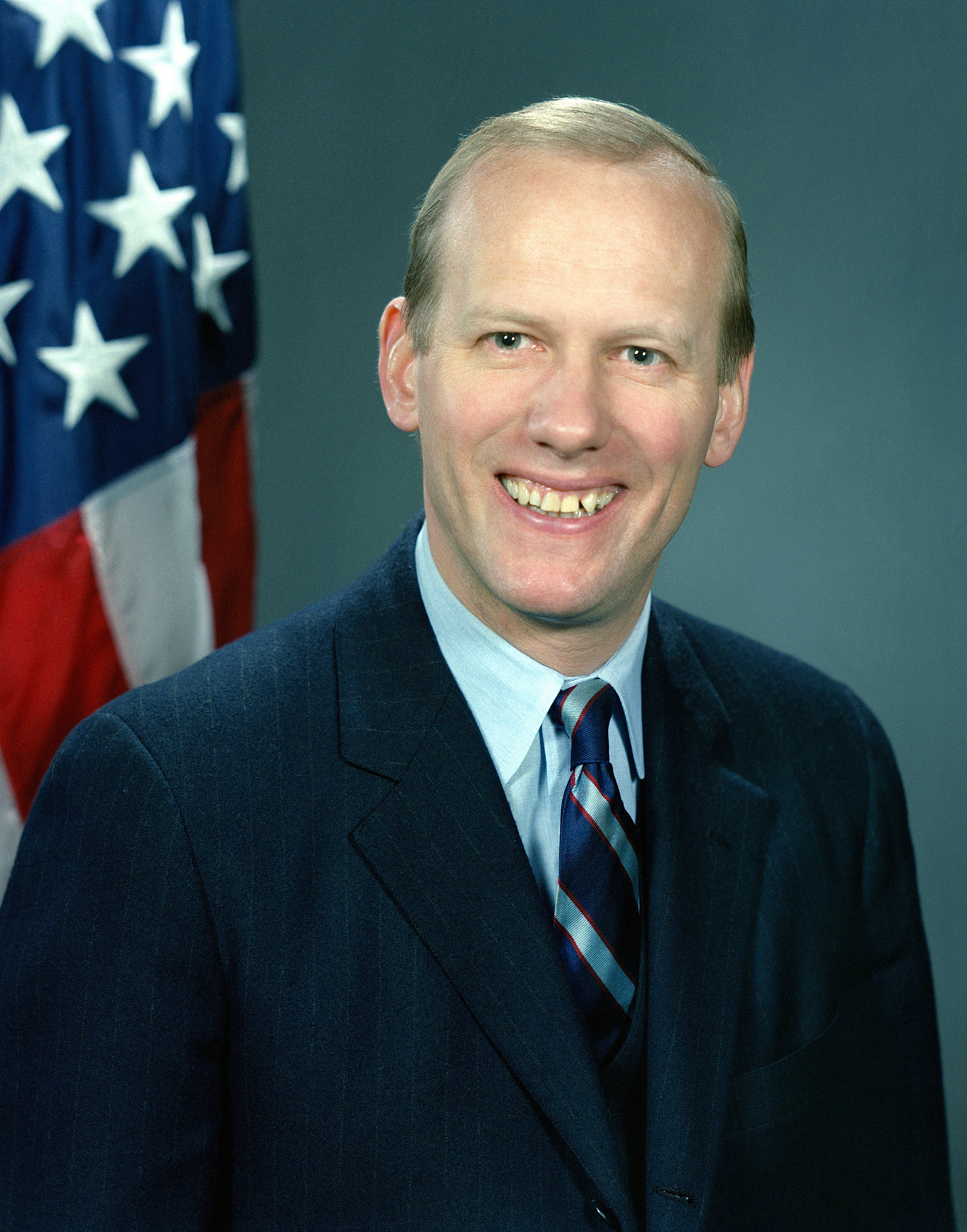
William Howard Taft IV

- Charles S. Abbot, deputy commander-in-chief of the U.S. European Command (1998–2000)
- Clara Adams-Ender, chief of the U.S. Army Nurse Corps (1987–1991)
- James A. Adkins, adjutant general of Maryland (2008–2015)
- Clifford Alexander Jr., United States secretary of the Army (1977–1981)
- Ricardo Aponte, brigadier general in the Air Force Reserve Command and the U.S. Air Force (1972–2007)
- Donald Arthur, Surgeon General of the U.S. Navy (2004–2007)
- Jeremy Bash, chief of staff to the U.S. secretary of defense (2011–2013), chief of staff to the director of the Central Intelligence Agency (2009–2011)
- Charles Blanchard, general counsel of the Army (1999–2001), General Counsel of the Air Force (2009–2013)
- Ronald R. Blanck, surgeon general of the U.S. Army (1996–2000)
- Charles G. Boyd, deputy commander-in-chief of the U.S. European Command (1992–1995)
- John A. Bradley, lieutenant general in the U.S. Air Force (1967–2008)
- David M. Brahms, brigadier general in the U.S. Marine Corps (1961–1988)
- Douglas A. Brook, assistant secretary of the Navy (financial management and comptroller) (2007–2009) (Republican)
- Louis Caldera, U.S. secretary of the Army (1998–2001), director of the White House Military Office (2009)
- Donald M. Campbell Jr., commanding general of United States Army Europe (2012–2014)
- Robert Cardillo, director of the National Geospatial-Intelligence Agency (2014–2019), deputy director of the Defense Intelligence Agency (2010)
- Patrick G. Carrick, former deputy director of the Homeland Security Advanced Research Projects Agency
- Antonia Chayes, assistant secretary of the Air Force (manpower & reserve affairs) (1977–1979), U.S. under secretary of the Air Force (1979–1981)
- Stephen A. Cheney, brigadier general in the U.S. Marine Corps (1971–2001)
- Peter W. Chiarelli, vice chief of staff of the United States Army (2008–2012)
- Henry G. Chiles Jr., commander-in-chief of United States Strategic Command (1994–1996)
- Deborah P. Christie, assistant secretary of the Navy for financial management and comptroller (1994–1998)
- Wesley Clark, supreme allied commander, Europe (1997–2000), 2004 candidate for president
- Torie Clarke, assistant to the secretary of defense for public affairs (2001–2003) (Republican)
- Ronald S. Coleman, lieutenant general in the U.S. Navy (1968–1970) and the U.S. Marine Corps (1974–2009)
- Erin Conaton, under secretary of defense for personnel and readiness (2012)
- Peter Cooke, major general in the U.S. Air Force (1973–2012)
- John Dalton, United States secretary of the Navy (1993–1998)
- Richard Danzig, U.S. secretary of the Navy (1998–2001, under secretary of the Navy (1993–1997)
- Rudy de Leon, U.S. deputy secretary of defense (2000–2001), under secretary of defense for personnel and readiness (1997–2000), under secretary of the Air Force (1994–1997)
- Susan Y. Desjardins, commandant of Cadets of the United States Air Force Academy (2005–2012)
- Richard T. Devereaux, major general in the U.S. Air Force
- Michael Donley, U.S. secretary of the Air Force (2008–2013) (Republican)
- John W. Douglass, assistant secretary of the Navy (1995–1998)
- Raymond DuBois, acting under secretary of the Army (2005–2006) (Republican)
- Paul Eaton, major general in the U.S. Army (1972–2006)
- Mari K. Eder, major general in the U.S. Army (1977–2012)
- Stephen C. Evans, rear admiral in the U.S. Navy (1986–2020)
- John R. Ewers, major general in the U.S. Marine Corps (1984–2020)
- Eric Fanning, U.S. secretary of the Army (2016–2017) and acting secretary (2015–2016), acting U.S. secretary of the Air Force (2013)
- Michèle Flournoy, under secretary of defense for policy (2009–2012)
- Pat Foote, brigadier general in the U.S. Army (1959–1989)
- Michael T. Franken, vice admiral in the U.S. Navy (1978–2017)
- Juan M. Garcia III, assistant secretary of the Navy (manpower and reserve affairs) (2009–2016)
- Robert G. Gard Jr., lieutenant general in the U.S. Army (1950–1981)
- Jonathan D. George, brigadier general in the U.S. Air Force (1981–2011)
- Daniel B. Ginsberg, assistant secretary of the Air Force (manpower & reserve affairs) (2009–2013)
- Sherri W. Goodman, assistant secretary of defense for energy, installations, and environment (1993–2001)
- Michael Green, senior adviser to the Office of Asia Pacific Affairs (1997–2000) (Republican)
- Robert Hale, Under Secretary of Defense (Comptroller) (2009–2014)
- Irv Halter, major general in the U.S. Air Force (1977–2009)
- Ken Harbaugh, lieutenant in the U.S. Navy (1996–2005)
- Robert Harding, major general in the U.S. Army (1969–2001)
- Richard D. Hearney, assistant commandant of the Marine Corps (1994–1996)
- Clare Helminiak, rear admiral in the U.S. Public Health Service Commissioned Corps (1983–2005)
- Ben Hodges, lieutenant general in the U.S. Army (1980–2018)
- Reynold N. Hoover, deputy commander of the United States Northern Command (2016–2018)
- P. Gardner Howe III, president of the Naval War College (2014–2016)
- John Hutson, judge advocate general of the Navy (1997–2000)
- Paul Ignatius, U.S. secretary of the Navy (1967–1969)
- Chris Inglis, deputy director of the National Security Agency (2006–2014)
- Bobby Inman, director of the National Security Agency (1977–1981), deputy director of Central Intelligence (1981–1982)
- Deborah Lee James, U.S. secretary of the Air Force (2013–2017)
- Les Janka, deputy assistant secretary of defense for near Eastern and African Affairs (1976–1978) (Republican)
- Randy Jayne, major general in the U.S. Air Force and the Air National Guard (1962–2000)
- James Johnson, major general in the U.S. Army (1950–1990)
- Michelle D. Johnson, superintendent of the United States Air Force Academy (2013–2017)
- Michele S. Jones, U.S. Army Reserve (1982–2007), first woman to reach the position of command sergeant major of the U.S. Army Reserve
- Jan-Marc Jouas, lieutenant general in the U.S. Air Force (1979–2015)
- Frank Kendall III, under secretary of defense for acquisition and sustainment (2011–2017)
- Susan Koch, nuclear reduction expert for the Secretary of Defense
- Ken Krieg, under secretary of defense for acquisition and sustainment (2005–2007) (Republican)
- Thomas R. Lamont, assistant secretary of the Army (Manpower and Reserve Affairs) (2009–2013)
- J. William Leonard, director of the Information Security Oversight Office (2002–2008)
- Frank Libutti, lieutenant general in the U.S. Marine Corps (1966–2001)
- George E. Little, assistant secretary of defense for Public Affairs (2012–2013)
- Samuel J. Locklear, commander of United States Pacific Command (2012–2015)
- Deborah Loewer, rear admiral in the U.S. Navy (1976–2007), first woman promoted to a flagship rank in the U.S. Navy
- Letitia Long, director of the National Geospatial-Intelligence Agency (2010–2014)
- Charles D. Luckey, commanding general of the United States Army Reserve (2016–2020)
- Michael D. Lumpkin, under secretary of defense for policy (2014), assistant secretary of defense for special operations and low-intensity conflict (2013–2015)
- Boris Lushniak, U.S. surgeon general (2013–2014)
- David M. Maddox, commanding general of United States Army Europe (1992–1995)
- Stanley McChrystal, commander of U.S. forces in Afghanistan (2009–2010)
- Merrill McPeak, chief of staff of the U.S. Air Force (1990–1994) and U.S. secretary of the Air Force (1993)
- William H. McRaven, commander of the U.S. Special Operations Command (2011–2014)
- Dee McWilliams, major general in the U.S. Army (1974–2003)
- Joseph V. Medina, brigadier general in the U.S. Marine Corps (1976–2007)
- James N. Miller, under secretary of defense for Policy (2012–2014)
- Kenneth P. Moritsugu, U.S. surgeon general (2002, 2006–2007)
- Charles L. Munns, vice admiral in the U.S. Navy (1974–2007)
- Patrick Murphy, acting U.S. secretary of the Army (2016), under secretary of the Army (2016–2017), U.S. representative from PA-08 (2007–2011)
- Robert B. Murrett, director of the National Geospatial-Intelligence Agency (2006–2010)
- Vivek Murthy, U.S. surgeon general (2014–2017)
- Michael Myatt, major general in the U.S. Marine Corps (1963–1995)
- John B. Nathman, commander of the United States Fleet Forces Command (2005–2007)
- Lloyd W. Newton, commander of the Air Education and Training Command (1997–2000)
- Joseph Nye, assistant secretary of defense for international security affairs (1994–1995)
- Sean O'Keefe, NASA administrator (2001–2004), Secretary of the Navy (1992–1993) (Republican)
- David R. Oliver Jr., rear admiral in the U.S. Navy (1963–1995)
- Eric T. Olson, commander of the U.S. Special Operations Command (2007–2011)
- Charles P. Otstott, deputy chairman of the NATO Military Committee (1990–1992)
- B.J. Penn, acting secretary of the Navy (2009), assistant secretary of the Navy for installations and environment (2005–2009)
- Whit Peters, U.S. secretary of the Air Force (1999–2001), under secretary of the Air Force (1997–1999)
- Robert B. Pirie Jr., acting secretary of the Navy (2001), under secretary of the Navy (2000–2001)
- Gale Pollock, deputy surgeon general of the U.S. Army (2006–2007)
- Fernandez Ponds, rear admiral in the U.S. Navy (1983–2015)
- Kevin M. Quinn, rear admiral in the U.S. Navy (1984–2012)
- Joe Reeder, under secretary of the Army (1993–1997)
- Raymond F. Rees, major general in the U.S. Army (1966–2013)
- Charles H. Roadman II, surgeon general of the United States Air Force (1996–1999)
- Patricia Rose, major general in the U.S. Air Force (1984–2017)
- Joseph E. Schmitz, inspector general of the Department of Defense (2002–2005) (Republican)
- Paul Selva, vice chairman of the Joint Chiefs of Staff (2015–2019)
- Robert W. Sennewald, commanding general of the United States Army Forces Command (1984–1986)
- Walter B. Slocombe, under secretary of defense for policy (1994–2001)
- Robert M. Speer, U.S. secretary of the Army (2017)
- Clifford L. Stanley, under secretary of defense for personnel and readiness (2010–2011)
- Howard D. Stendahl, Chief of Chaplains of the United States Air Force (2012–2015)
- Maura Sullivan, assistant to the secretary of defense for public affairs (2015)
- Loree Sutton, brigadier general of the U.S. Army (1980–2010)
- William Howard Taft IV, U.S. Deputy Secretary of Defense (1984–1989); great-grandson of President William Howard Taft (Republican)
- Antonio Taguba, major general in the U.S. Army (1972–2007)
- Paul E. Tobin Jr., rear admiral in the U.S. Navy (1963–1998)
- Henry G. Ulrich III, commander of the United States Naval Forces Europe (2005–2007)
- Robin Umberg, brigadier general of the U.S. Army (1973–2010)
- W. Craig Vanderwagen, rear admiral of the U.S. Public Health Service Commissioned Corps (1978–2006)
- Francis D. Vavala, adjutant general of the Delaware Army National Guard (1999–2017)
- Dale Vesser, lieutenant general in the U.S. Army (1954–1987)
- Michael G. Vickers, Under Secretary of Defense for Intelligence (2011–2015) (Republican)
- Matthew Waxman, Deputy Assistant Secretary of Defense for Detainee Affairs (2004–2005) (Republican)
- Andrew C. Weber, Assistant Secretary of Defense for Nuclear, Chemical, and Biological Defense Programs (2009–2014)
- Jack Weinstein, Deputy Chief of Staff for Strategic Deterrence and Nuclear Integration of the United States Air Force (2015–2018)
- Joseph J. Went, Assistant Commandant of the Marine Corps (1988–1990)
- Sheila Widnall, U.S. Secretary of the Air Force (1993–1997)
- Kayla Williams, former intelligence specialist in the U.S. Army, author
- Michael J. Williams Assistant Commandant of the Marine Corps (2000–2002)
- Margaret C. Wilmoth, major general in the U.S. Army Reserve (1983–2012)
- Jesse A. Wilson Jr., Commander of Naval Surface Force Atlantic (2017–2019)
- Johnnie E. Wilson, commanding general of the United States Army Materiel Command (1996–1999)
- Margaret H. Woodward, major general in the U.S. Army (1982–2014)
- Dov Zakheim, Under Secretary of Defense (Comptroller) (2001–2004) (Republican)

=== Justice Department officials ===
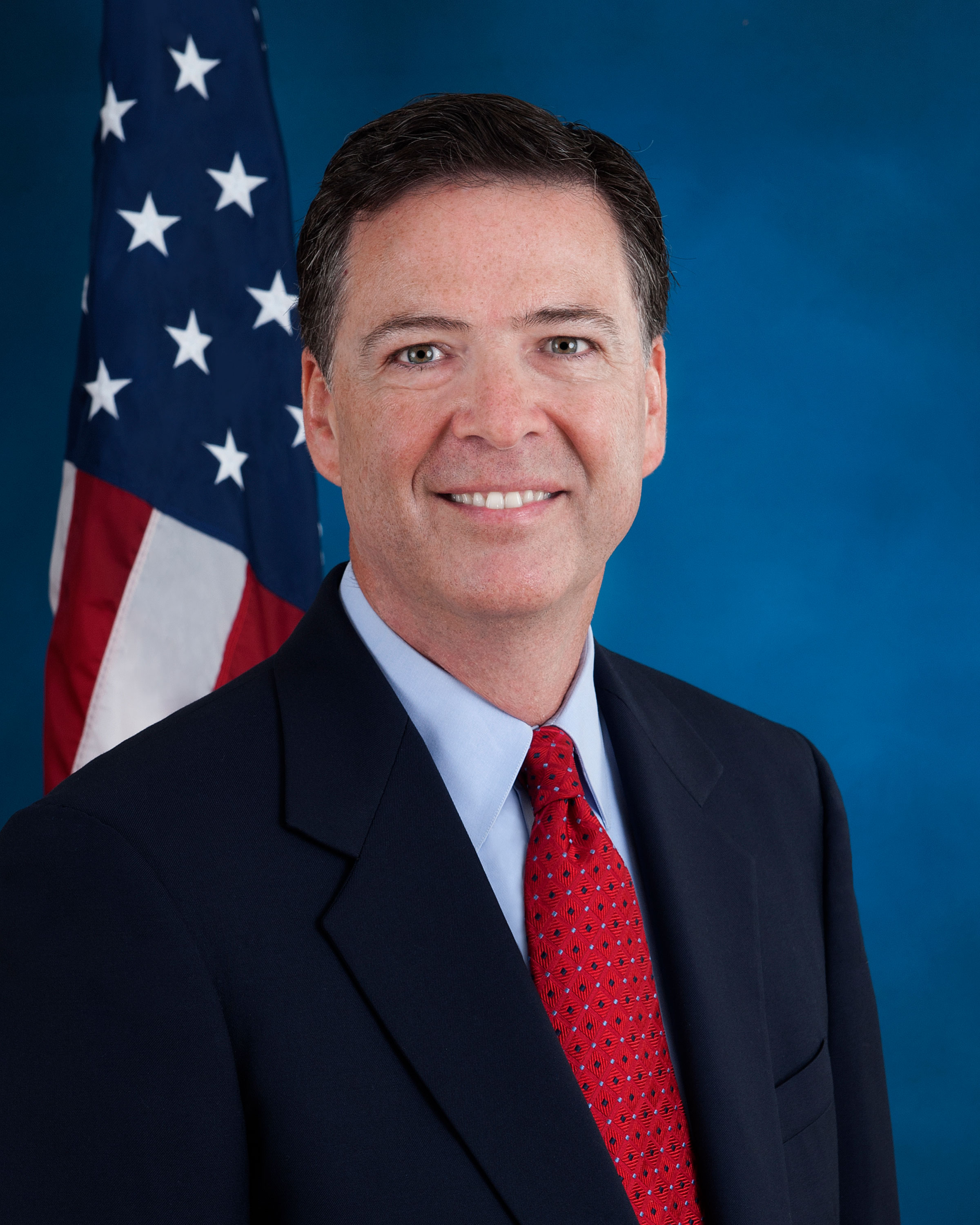
Jim Comey

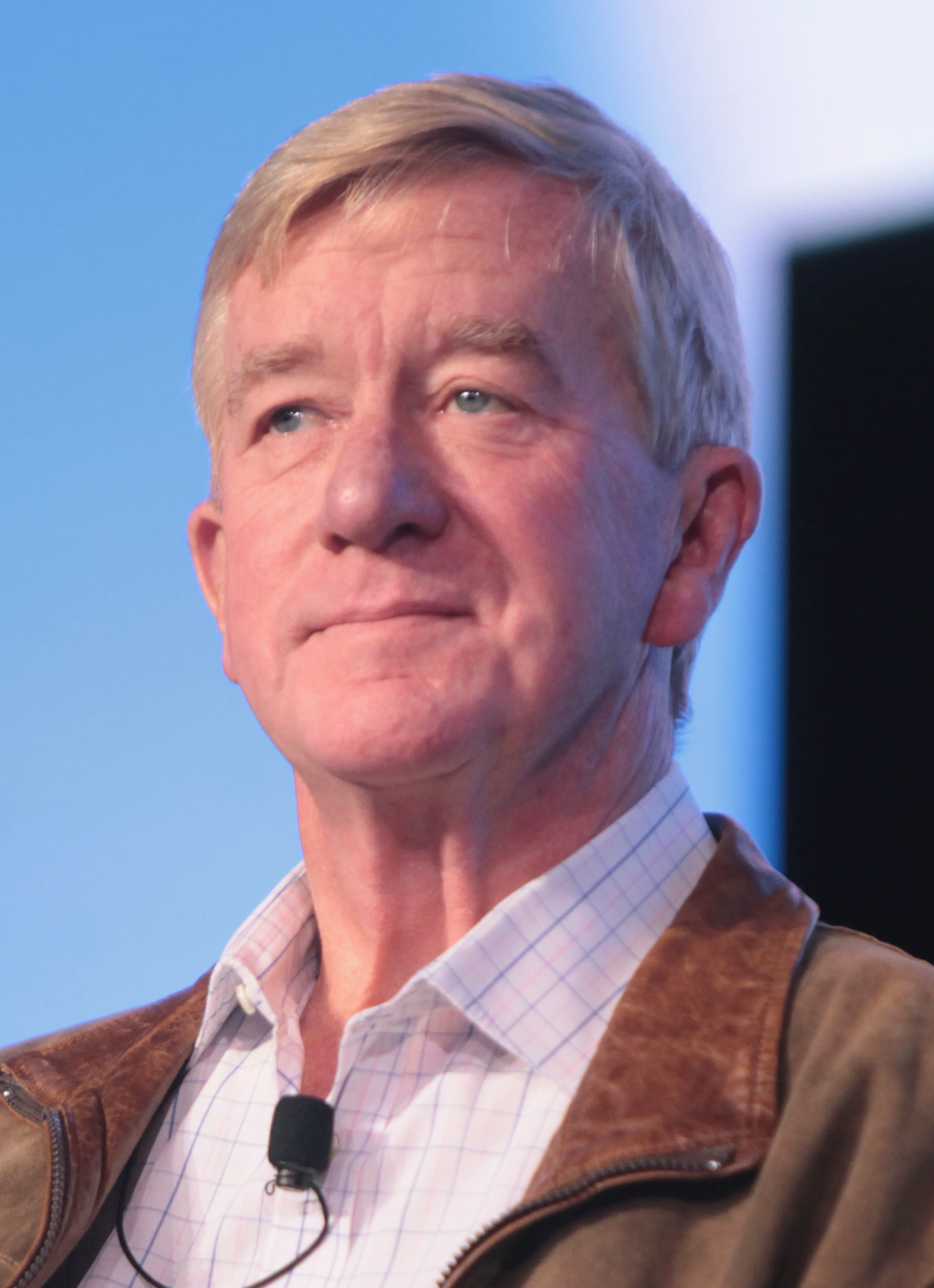
Bill Weld

- A. Brian Albritton, U.S. Attorney for the Middle District of Florida (2008–2010) (Republican)
- Donald B. Ayer, U.S. Deputy Attorney General (1989–1990), U.S. Attorney for the Eastern District of California (1981–1986) (Republican)
- A. Lee Bentley, III, U.S. Attorney for the Middle District of Florida (2014–2017)
- Daniel Bogden, U.S. Attorney for the District of Nevada (2001–2007, 2009–2017) (Republican)
- Greg Brower, U.S. Attorney for the District of Nevada (2008–2009) (Republican)
- Wayne Budd, U.S. Attorney for the District of Massachusetts (1989–1992), U.S. Associate Attorney General (1992–1993) (Republican)
- John P. Carlin, U.S. Assistant Attorney General for the National Security Division (2014–2016)
- Paul K. Charlton, U.S. Attorney for the District of Arizona (2001–2006) (Republican)
- James M. Cole, U.S. Deputy Attorney General (2010–2015)
- James Comey, Director of the Federal Bureau of Investigation (2013–2017), U.S. Deputy Attorney General (2003–2005) (Independent)
- Roxanne Conlin, U.S. Attorney for the Southern District of Iowa (1977–1981)
- Michael W. Cotter, U.S. Attorney for the District of Montana (2009–2017)
- Deirdre M. Daly, U.S. Attorney for the District of Connecticut (2013–2017)
- Steve Dettelbach, U.S. Attorney for the Northern District of Ohio (2009–2015)
- Conner Eldridge, U.S. Attorney for the Western District of Arkansas (2010–2015)
- David B. Fein, U.S. Attorney for the District of Connecticut (2010–2013)
- Paul J. Fishman, U.S. Attorney for the District of New Jersey (2009–2017)
- John P. Fishwick Jr., U.S. Attorney for the Western District of Virginia (2015–2017)
- Charles Fried, U.S. Solicitor General (1985–1989) (Republican)
- Deborah R. Gilg, U.S. Attorney for the District of Nebraska (2009–2017)
- Jonathan L. Goldstein, U.S. Attorney for the District of New Jersey (1974–1977) (Republican)
- Barry Grissom, U.S. Attorney for the District of Kansas (2010–2016)
- Timothy J. Heaphy, U.S. Attorney for the Western District of Virginia (2009–2015)
- Thomas B. Heffelfinger, U.S. Attorney for the District of Minnesota (1991–1993, 2001–2006) (Republican)
- Dwight Holton, U.S. Attorney for the District of Oregon (2010–2011)
- David Iglesias, U.S. Attorney for the District of New Mexico (2001–2006) (Republican)
- Marcos Jimenez, U.S. Attorney for the Southern District of Florida (2002–2005) (Republican)
- David N. Kelley, U.S. Attorney for the Southern District of New York (2003–2005) (Republican)
- Nicholas A. Klinefeldt, U.S. Attorney for the Southern District of Iowa (2009–2015)
- David S. Kris, U.S. Assistant Attorney General for the National Security Division (2009–2011)
- Karen L. Loeffler, U.S. Attorney for the District of Alaska (2009–2017)
- Neil MacBride, U.S. Attorney for the Eastern District of Virginia (2009–2013)
- Ronald Machen, U.S. Attorney for the District of Columbia (2010–2015)
- Kenneth Magidson, U.S. Attorney for the Southern District of Texas (2011–2017)
- John McKay, U.S. Attorney for the Western District of Washington (2001–2006) (Republican)
- Michael McKay, U.S. Attorney for the Western District of Washington (1989–1993) (Republican)
- Patrick Miles Jr., U.S. Attorney for the Western District of Michigan (2012–2017)
- Jan Paul Miller, U.S. Attorney for the Central District of Illinois (2002–2005) (Republican)
- Lisa Monaco, Homeland Security Advisor (2013–2017), U.S. Assistant Attorney General for the National Security Division (2011–2013)
- Bill Nettles, U.S. Attorney for the District of South Carolina (2010–2016)
- Carmen Ortiz, U.S. Attorney for the District of Massachusetts (2009–2017)
- Matthew D. Orwig, U.S. Attorney for the Eastern District of Texas (2001–2007) (Republican)
- Paul Perez, U.S. Attorney for the Middle District of Florida (2002–2007) (Republican)
- Tim Purdon, U.S. Attorney for the District of North Dakota (2010–2015)
- Carole Rendon, U.S. Attorney for the Northern District of Ohio (2016–2017)
- Sarah Saldaña, director of Immigration and Customs Enforcement (2014–2017), U.S. Attorney for the Northern District of Texas (2011–2014)
- Kevin W. Techau, U.S. Attorney for the Northern District of Iowa (2014–2017)
- Anne Tompkins, U.S. Attorney for the Western District of North Carolina (2010–2015)
- Stanley Twardy, U.S. attorney for the District of Connecticut (1985–1991) (Republican)
- John W. Vaudreuil, U.S. Attorney for the Western District of Wisconsin (2010–2017)
- Benjamin B. Wagner, U.S. attorney for the Eastern District of California (2009–2016)
- Kenneth L. Wainstein, U.S. attorney for the District of Columbia (2004–2006), U.S. Assistant Attorney General for the National Security Division (2006–2008), U.S. Homeland Security Advisor (2008–2009) (Republican)
- John F. Walsh, U.S. Attorney for the District of Colorado (2010–2016)
- Bill Weld, U.S. attorney for the District of Massachusetts (1981–1986), U.S. assistant attorney general for the Criminal Division (1986–1988), governor of Massachusetts (1991–1997) (Republican)
- Tony West, U.S. assistant attorney general for the Civil Division (2009–2012), U.S. associate attorney general (2012–2014), brother-in-law of Kamala Harris
- Kinney Zalesne, counsel to the U.S. attorney general (1998–2003)

=== Homeland Security Department officials ===
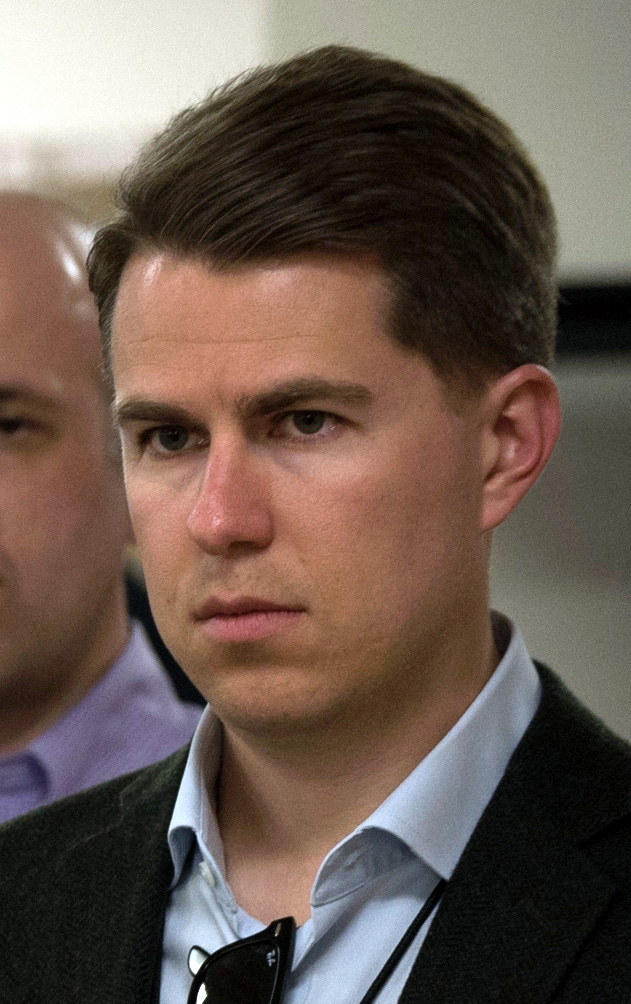
Miles Taylor

- Jarrod Bernstein, principal deputy assistant secretary for Intergovernmental Affairs (2009–2011)
- James C. Card, vice admiral in the U.S. Coast Guard (1964–2000)
- Richard Falkenrath, U.S. deputy secretary of Homeland Security (2003–2004) (Republican)
- Betsy Markey, assistant secretary of Homeland Security for Intergovernmental Affairs (2011–2013), U.S. representative from CO-04 (2009–2011)
- Alejandro Mayorkas, U.S. deputy secretary of Homeland Security (2013–2016), U.S. secretary of Homeland Security (2021–present)
- John Mitnick, general counsel of the U.S. Department of Homeland Security (2018–2019) (Republican)
- D. Brian Peterman, vice admiral in the U.S. Coast Guard (1973–2008)
- Clyde Robbins, vice admiral in the U.S. Coast Guard (1955–1990)
- Francis X. Taylor, under secretary of Homeland Security for intelligence and analysis (2014–2017)
- Miles Taylor, chief of staff of the U.S. Department of Homeland Security (2017–2019) (Republican)
- Paul Zukunft, former commandant of the United States Coast Guard (2014–2018)

=== Energy Department officials ===
- Linton Brooks, Under Secretary of Energy for Nuclear Security and administrator of the National Nuclear Security Administration (2003–2007) (Republican)
- Frank Klotz, Under Secretary of Energy for Nuclear Security (2014–2018)
- Arun Majumdar, director of the Energy Advanced Research Projects Agency (2009–2012)
- Franklin Orr, Under Secretary of Energy for Science (2014–2017)
- Elizabeth Sherwood-Randall, Deputy Secretary of Energy (2014–2017)
- Steve Spinner, stimulus adviser for the U.S. Department of Energy (2009–2010)

=== White House officials ===
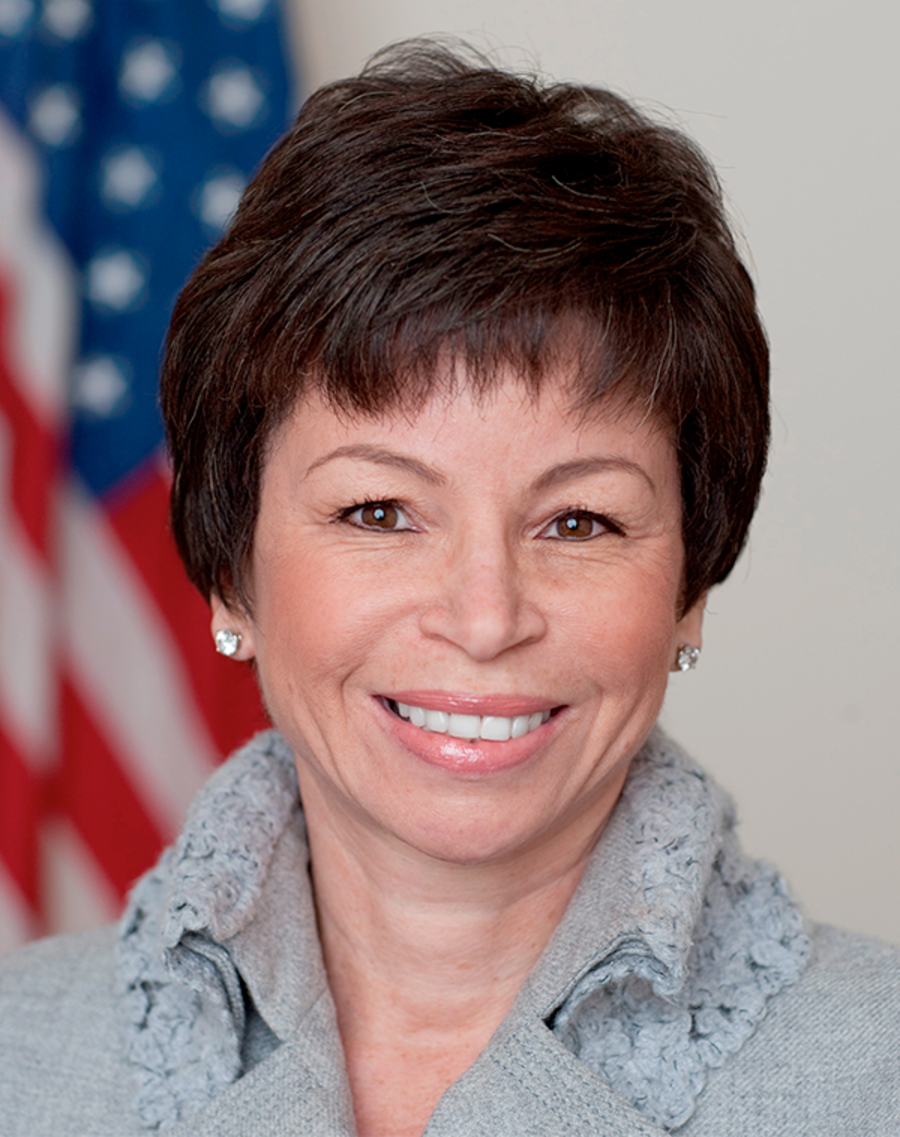
Valerie Jarrett

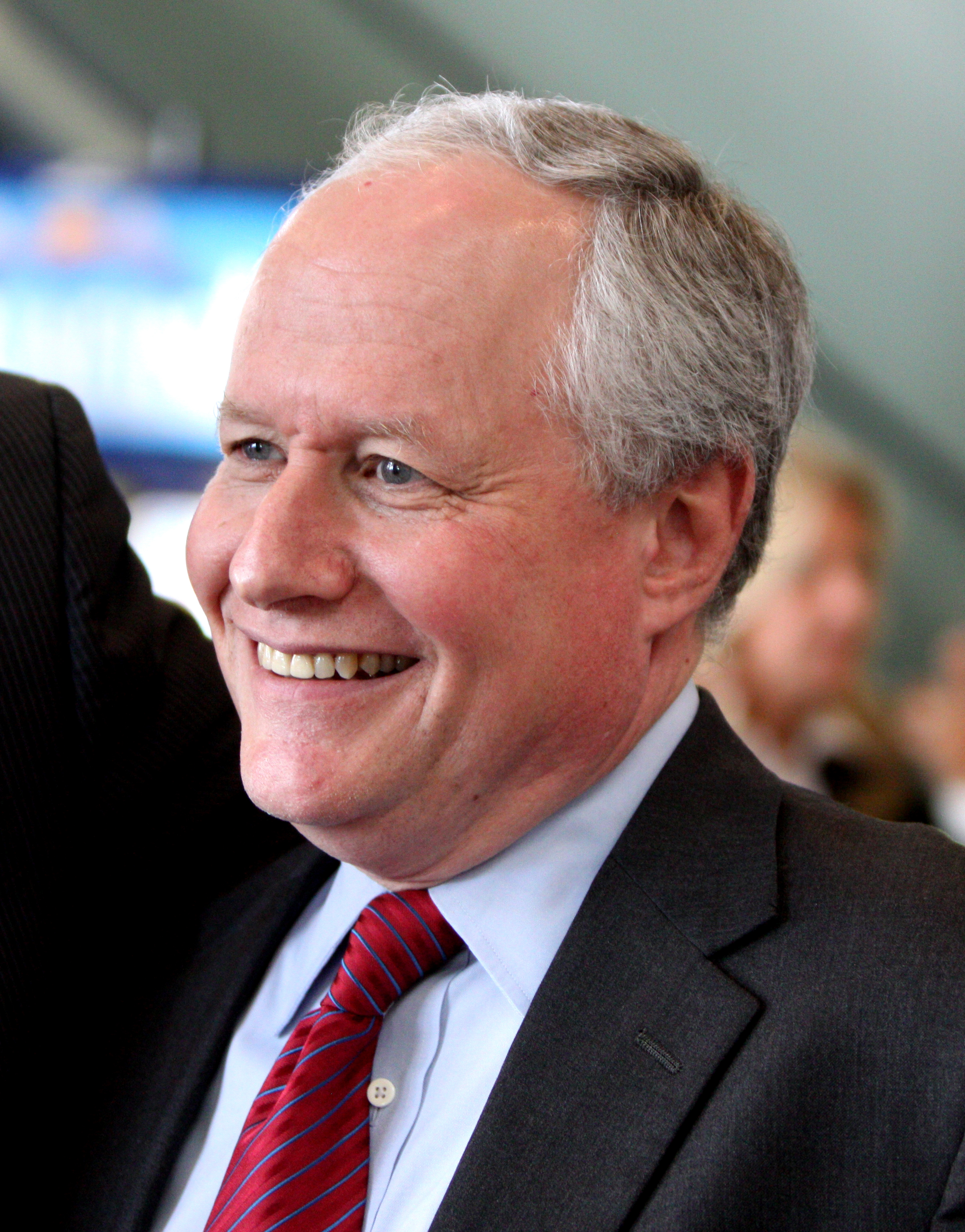
Bill Kristol

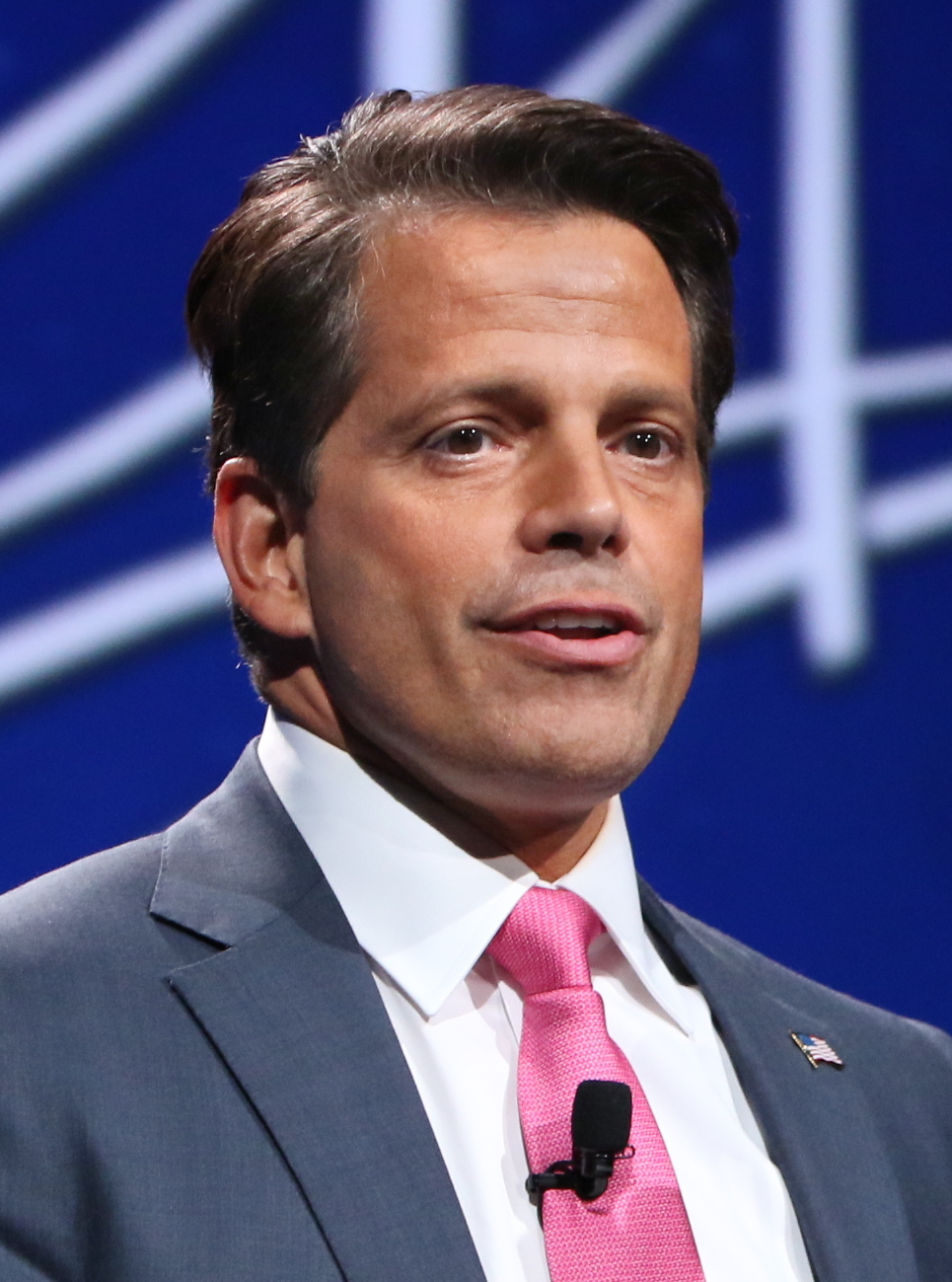
Anthony Scaramucci

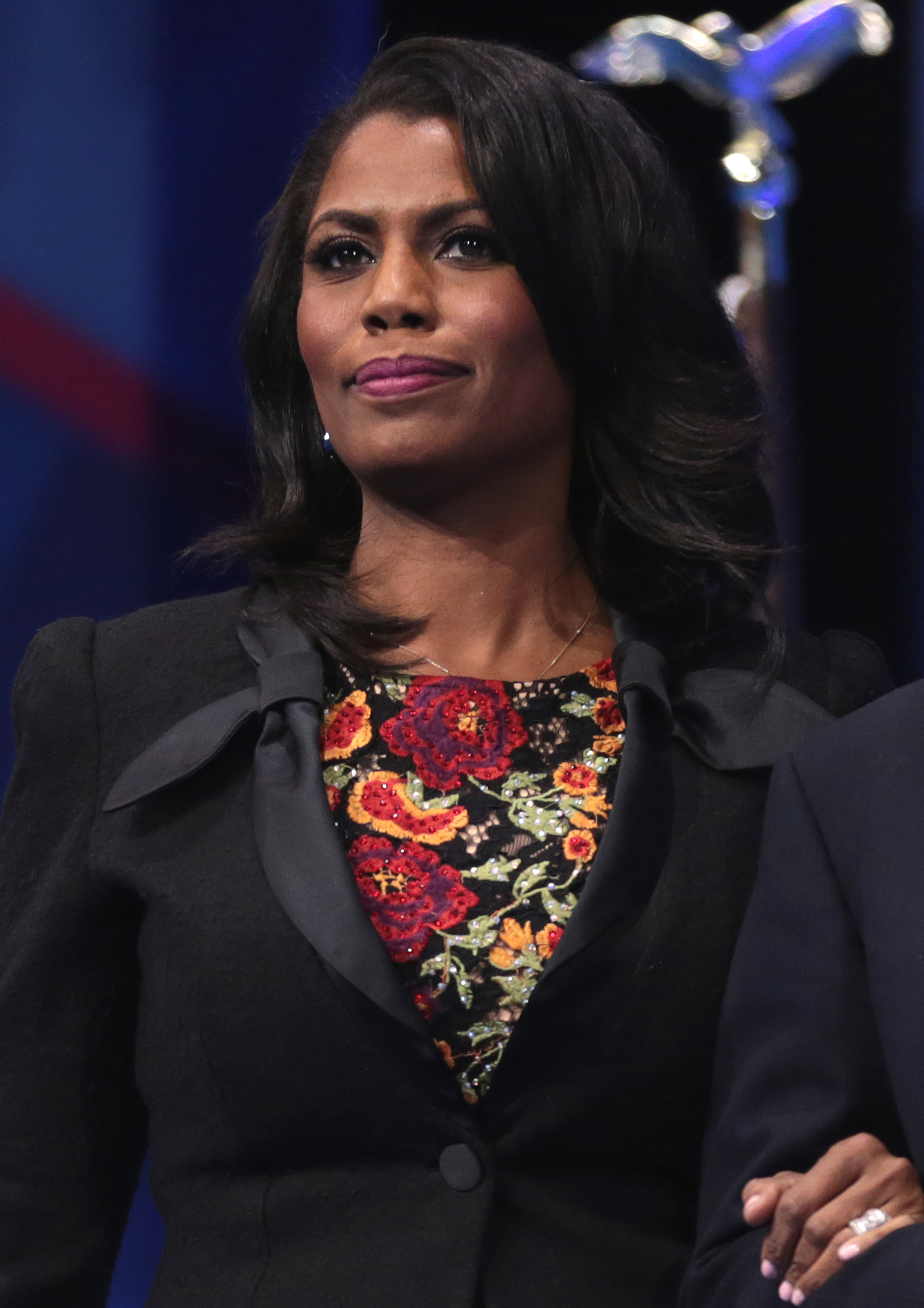
Omarosa

- Steve Abbot, Deputy Homeland Security Advisor (2001–2003) (Republican)
- Kiran Ahuja, executive director of the White House Initiative on Asian Americans and Pacific Islanders (2009–2015)
- Eli Attie, screenwriter, producer, White House speech writer (2000)
- Kenneth Baer, associate director of communications for the White House's Office of Management and Budget (2009–2012)
- Bruce Bartlett, author, historian, policy advisor to Ronald Reagan (Independent, former Republican)
- Robert Bauer, White House Counsel (2010–2011)
- Kenneth Bernard, special assistant to the president for biodefense and as assistant surgeon general (2002–2005) (Republican)
- Jason Bordoff, member of the U.S. National Security Council (2009–2013)
- Jake Braun, White House liaison to the Department of Homeland Security
- Victor Cha, director of Asian Affairs of the U.S. National Security Council (2004–2007) (Republican)
- Aneesh Chopra, U.S. Chief Technology Officer (2009–2012)
- Nelson Cunningham, senior advisor to the special envoy for the Americas
- Nancy-Ann DeParle, White House Deputy Chief of Staff for Policy (2011–2013), director of the White House Office of Health Reform (2009–2011)
- Barbaralee Diamonstein-Spielvogel, White House assistant (1963–1966)
- Anita Dunn, White House Communications Director (2009)
- R. P. Eddy, director of the U.S. National Security Council (1994–1996)
- Gary Edson, Deputy National Security Advisor (2001–2004) (Republican)
- Aaron Friedberg, deputy assistant to the vice president for National Security (2003–2005) (Republican)
- Michael Gerson, White House director of speechwriting (2001–2006) (Republican)
- Chad Griffin, former member of the White House Press Office
- Avril Haines, Deputy National Security Advisor (2015–2017), Deputy Director of the Central Intelligence Agency (2013–2015)
- Cynthia Hogan, counsel to the vice president (2009–2013)
- John Holdren, director of the Office of Science and Technology Policy (2009–2017)
- Joel Hunter, advisory counsel for the White House Office of Faith-Based and Neighborhood Partnerships (2009–2010)
- Valerie Jarrett, director of the White House Office of Public Engagement and Intergovernmental Affairs (2009–2017), Senior Advisor to the President (2009–2017)
- Colin Kahl, National Security Advisor to the Vice President (2014–2017)
- Gil Kerlikowske, commissioner of U.S. Customs and Border Protection (2014–2017), director of the Office of National Drug Control Policy (2009–2014), Chief of Police of Seattle, Washington (2001–2009)
- Christopher A. Kojm, chair of the National Intelligence Council (2009–2014)
- Bill Kristol, Chief of Staff to the Vice President of the United States (1989–1993), founder of The Weekly Standard, editor of conservative The Bulwark
- Anthony Lake, U.S. National Security Advisor (1993–1997), Director of Policy Planning (1977–1981)
- Ann Lewis, Counselor to the President (1999–2001), White House Communications Director (1997–1999)
- Chris Lu, White House Cabinet Secretary (2009–2013), U.S. Deputy Secretary of Labor (2014–2017)
- Brett McGurk, Special Presidential Envoy for the Global Coalition to Counter the Islamic State of Iraq and the Levant (2015–2018)
- John E. McLaughlin, director of Central Intelligence (2004)
- Jami Miscik, chair of the President's Intelligence Advisory Board (2014–2017)
- Omarosa Manigault Newman, director of communications for the Office of Public Liaison (2017–2018) (Independent)
- Gautam Raghavan, associate director of the Office of Public Engagement (2011–2014)
- Steve Ricchetti, White House deputy chief of staff for operations (1998–2001) (national chair)
- Desirée Rogers, White House social secretary (2009–2010)
- Dan K. Rosenthal, assistant to the president and director of Advance (1997–2000), special assistant to the president and deputy director of Advance (1995–1997)
- Anthony Scaramucci, White House communications director (2017) (Republican)
- Greg Schultz, special assistant to the president (2013–2017) and senior advisor to Biden's campaign
- Sonal Shah, director of the Office of Social Innovation and Civic Participation (2009–2011)
- Stephen Slick, special assistant to the president (2005–2009) (Republican)
- Joseph Stiglitz, chair of the Council of Economic Advisers (1995–1997)
- Mona Sutphen, White House deputy chief of staff for policy (2009–2011)
- Olivia Troye, Homeland Security and Counterterrorism advisor to Vice President Pence (2018–2020) (Republican)
- Jeffrey Zients, director of the National Economic Council (2014–2017), acting director of the Office of Management and Budget (2012–2013, 2010)

=== Other executive branch officials ===
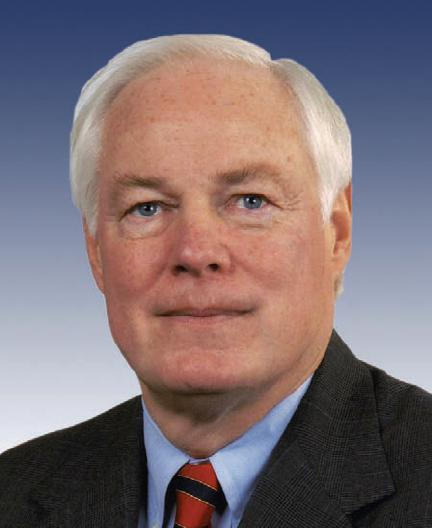
Jim Leach

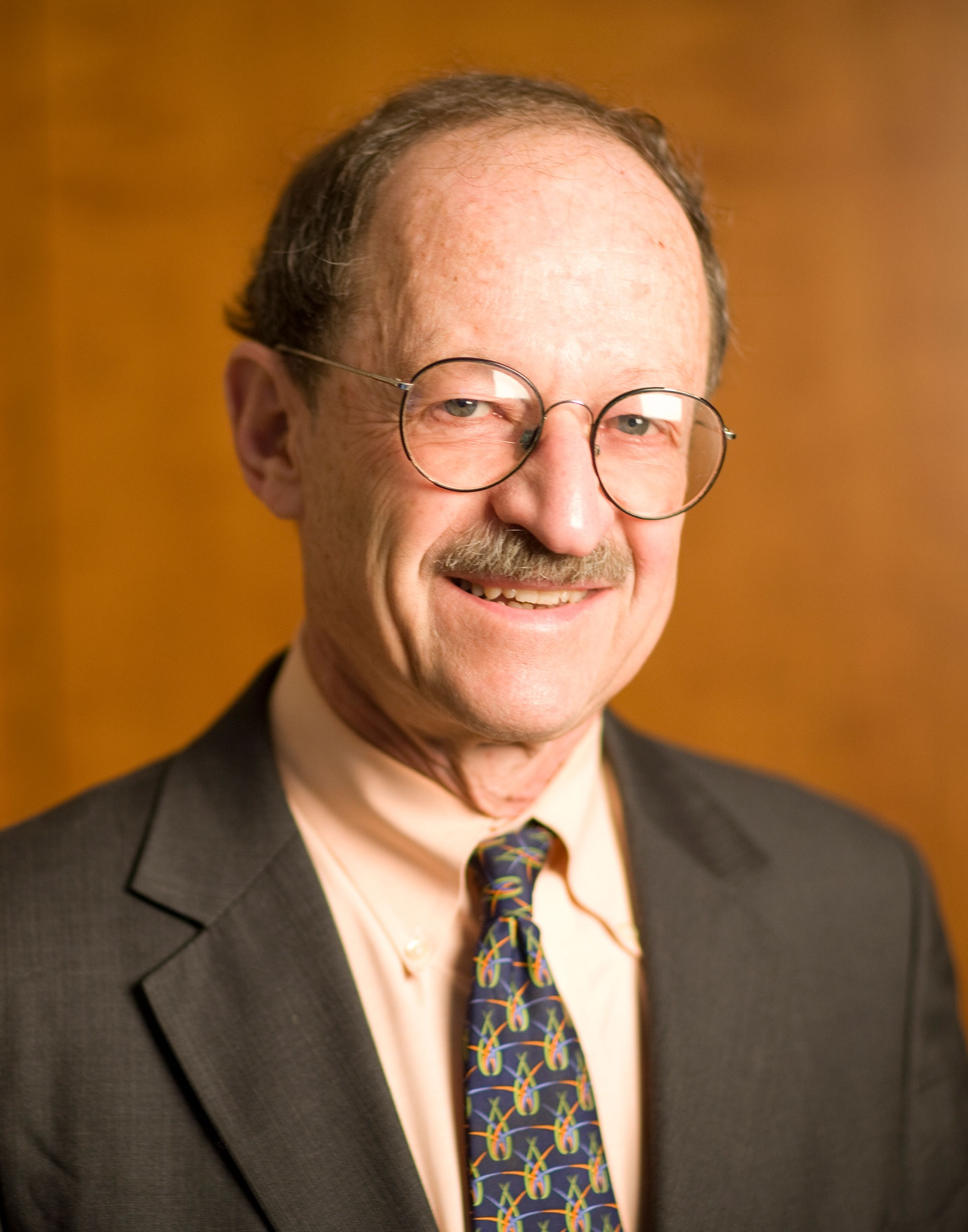
Harold E. Varmus

- William Drea Adams, chair of the National Endowment for the Humanities (2014–2017)
- Kenneth Adelman, Arms Control and Disarmament Agency director (1983–1987) (Republican)
- Roger Altman, U.S. deputy secretary of the treasury (1993–1994)
- Hunter Biden, vice chairman of the National Railroad Passenger Corporation (2006–2009), Biden's son
- Charles Bolden, administrator of the National Aeronautics and Space Administration (2009–2017)
- David Cohen, Deputy Director of the Central Intelligence Agency (2015–2017)
- Nani A. Coloretti, Deputy Secretary of Housing and Urban Development (2014–2017), Assistant Secretary of the Treasury for Management (2012–2014)
- Richard Cordray, director of the Consumer Financial Protection Bureau (2012–2017), 2018 nominee for governor of Ohio
- Leah D. Daughtry, assistant secretary for Administration and Management
- James M. Galloway, former public health service officer for Region V
- W. Scott Gould, Deputy Secretary of Veterans Affairs (2009–2013)
- Jimmy Gurulé, Under Secretary of the Treasury for Terrorism and Financial Intelligence (2001–2003) (Republican)
- Jonathan Jarvis, director of the National Park Service (2009–2017)
- Ray Jefferson, U.S. assistant secretary for the Veterans' Employment and Training Service (2009–2011)
- Douglas Kamerow, U.S. Public Health Service employee (1979–2001)
- Donald Kerr, principal deputy director of national intelligence (2007–2009) (Republican)
- David A. Kessler, Commissioner of Food and Drugs (1990–1997)
- Esther Kia'aina, assistant secretary of the interior for insular areas (2014–2017)
- Howard Koh, Assistant Secretary for Health (2009–2014)
- Jim Leach, chair of the National Endowment for the Humanities (2009–2013), U.S. representative from IA-02 (2003–2007), chair of the House Committee on Financial Services (1995–2001) (Republican)
- Michael Leiter, director of the National Counterterrorism Center (2007–2011) (Republican)
- Chris Lu, Deputy Secretary of Labor (2014–2017), White House Cabinet Secretary (2009–2013)
- Jane Lubchenco, administrator of the National Oceanic and Atmospheric Administration (2009–2013), Under Secretary of Commerce for Oceans and Atmosphere (2009–2013)
- Rosario Marin, treasurer of the United States (2001–2003) (Republican)
- Sharon McGowan, former acting general counsel for Policy at the U.S. Office of Personnel Management
- Susan Ness, Commissioner of the Federal Communications Commission (1994–2001)
- Dava Newman, Deputy Administrator of the National Aeronautics and Space Administration (2015–2017)
- Matthew G. Olsen, director of the National Counterterrorism Center (2011–2014)
- Edward Powell Jr., U.S. Deputy Secretary of Veterans Affairs (2000–2001)
- Clyde V. Prestowitz Jr., former counselor to the U.S. Secretary of Commerce (Republican)
- Sonny Ramaswamy, administrator of the National Institute of Food and Agriculture (2012–2018)
- Robert Roche, former member of the Advisory Committee for Trade Policy and Negotiations
- Lillian Salerno, Deputy Undersecretary for Rural Development, U.S. Department of Agriculture (2015–2017)
- Rob Shepardson, former member of the President's Council on Sports, Fitness, and Nutrition
- Marc Stanley, former Council Member of the U.S. Holocaust Memorial Museum
- Eric Stein, Deputy Assistant Secretary for Consumer Protection at the U.S. Treasury Department (2009–2010)
- Joshua Steiner, chief of staff of the U.S. Treasury Department (1993–2001)
- Kathryn D. Sullivan, Under Secretary of Commerce for Oceans and Atmosphere and administrator of the National Oceanic and Atmospheric Administration (2013–2017), former NASA astronaut
- Neera Tanden, senior advisor in the U.S. Department of Health and Human Services
- John D. Trasviña, Assistant Secretary of Housing and Urban Development for Fair Housing and Equal Opportunity (2009–2014)
- Harold E. Varmus, director of the National Cancer Institute (2010–2015), director of the National Institutes of Health (1993–1999)
- Juan Verde, U.S. Department of Commerce, International Trade Administration, Deputy Assistant Secretary of Europe (2009–2011)
- Robert A. Whitney, acting Surgeon General of the United States (1993)

== Former federal judicial officials ==
- Moe Davis, Administrative Law Judge in the U.S. Department of Labor (2015–2019), Chief Prosecutor of the Guantanamo military commissions (2005–2007)
- Lacy Thornburg, judge of the U.S. District Court for the Western District of North Carolina (1995–2009), attorney general of North Carolina (1985–1993)

== State, territorial, and tribal executive officials ==
=== Current governors ===
==== State and territorial ====
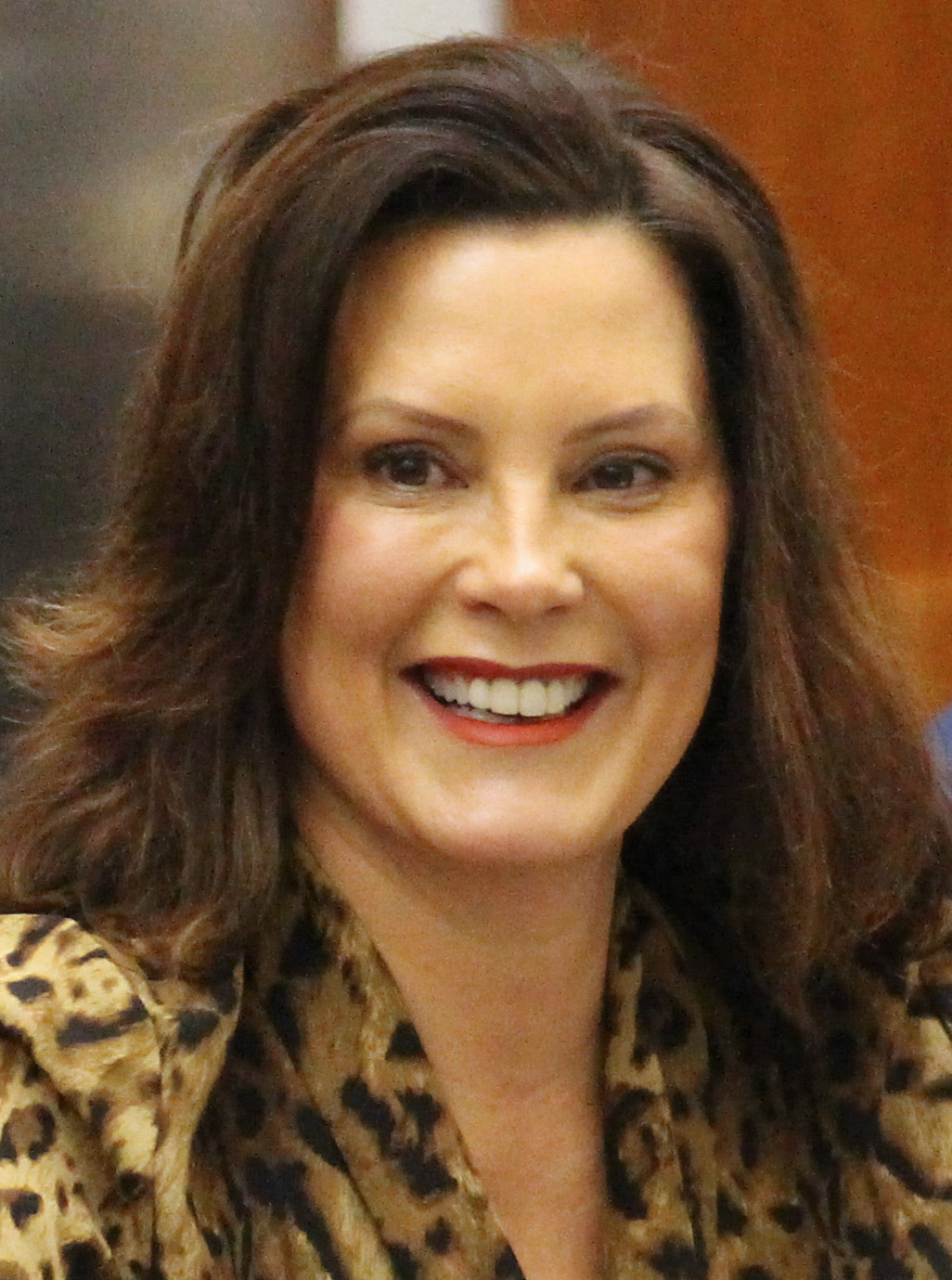
Gretchen Whitmer

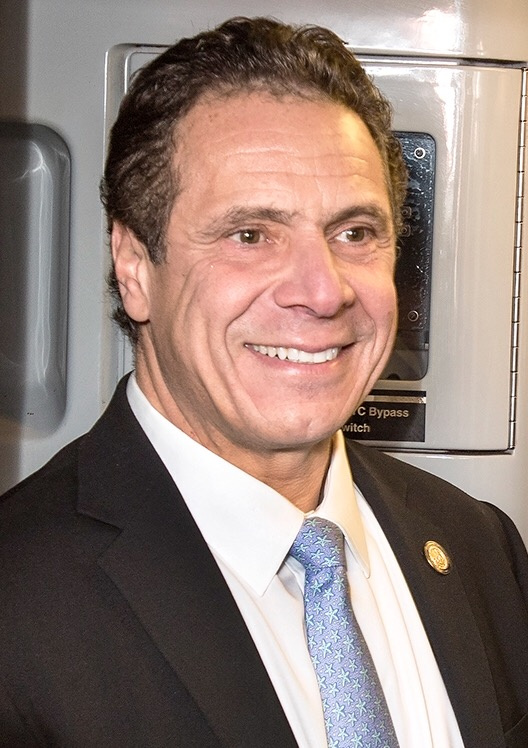
Andrew Cuomo

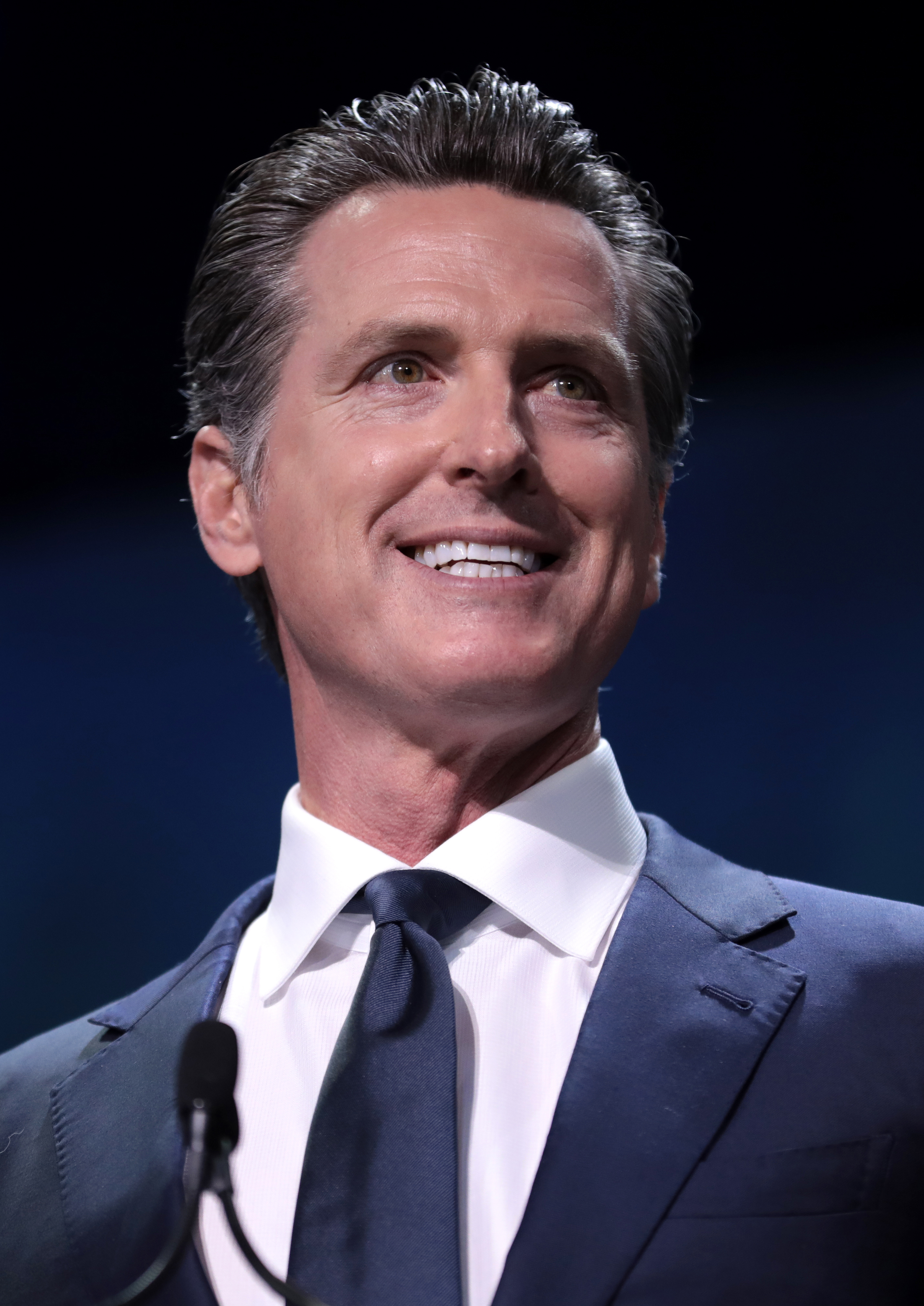
Gavin Newsom

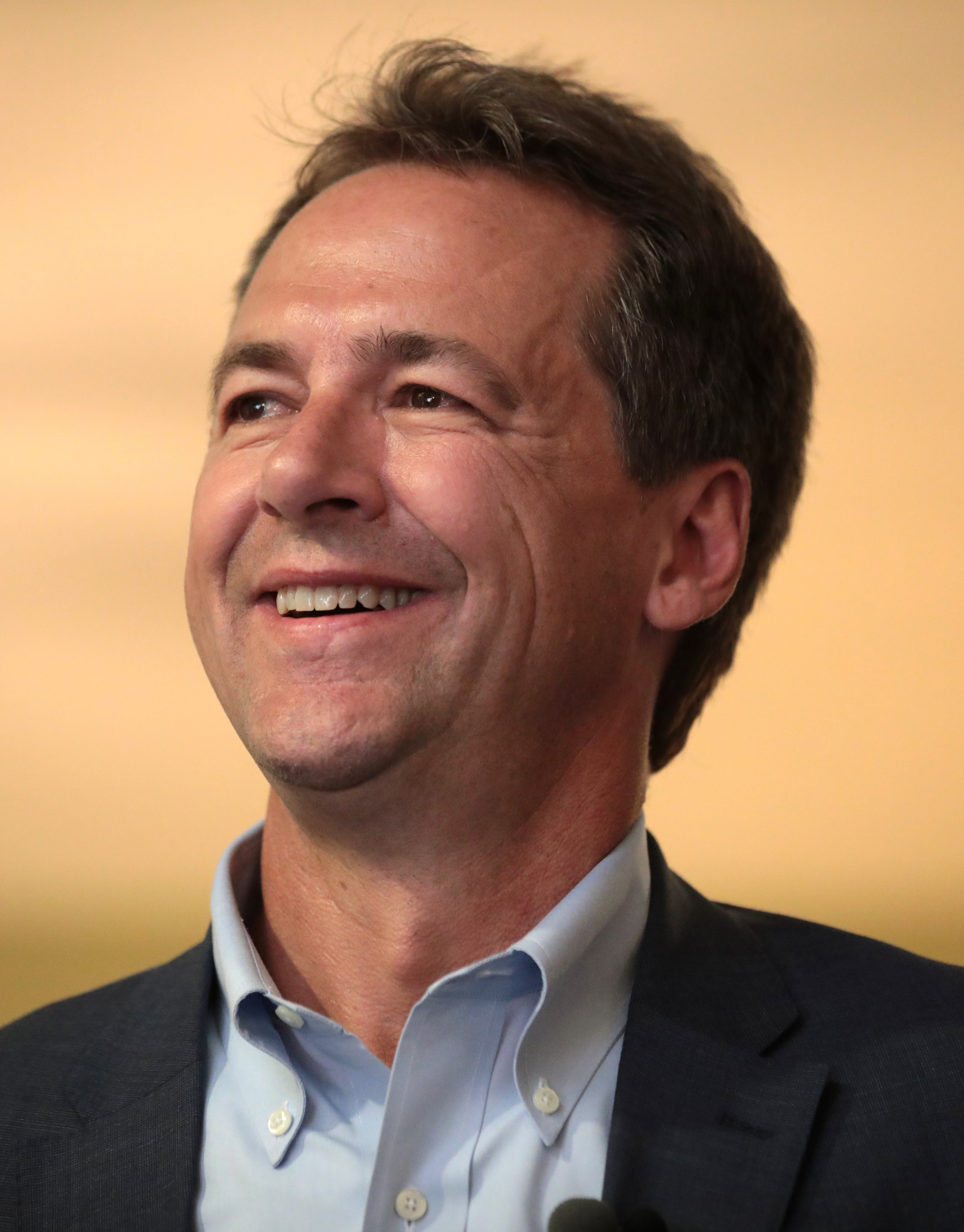
Steve Bullock

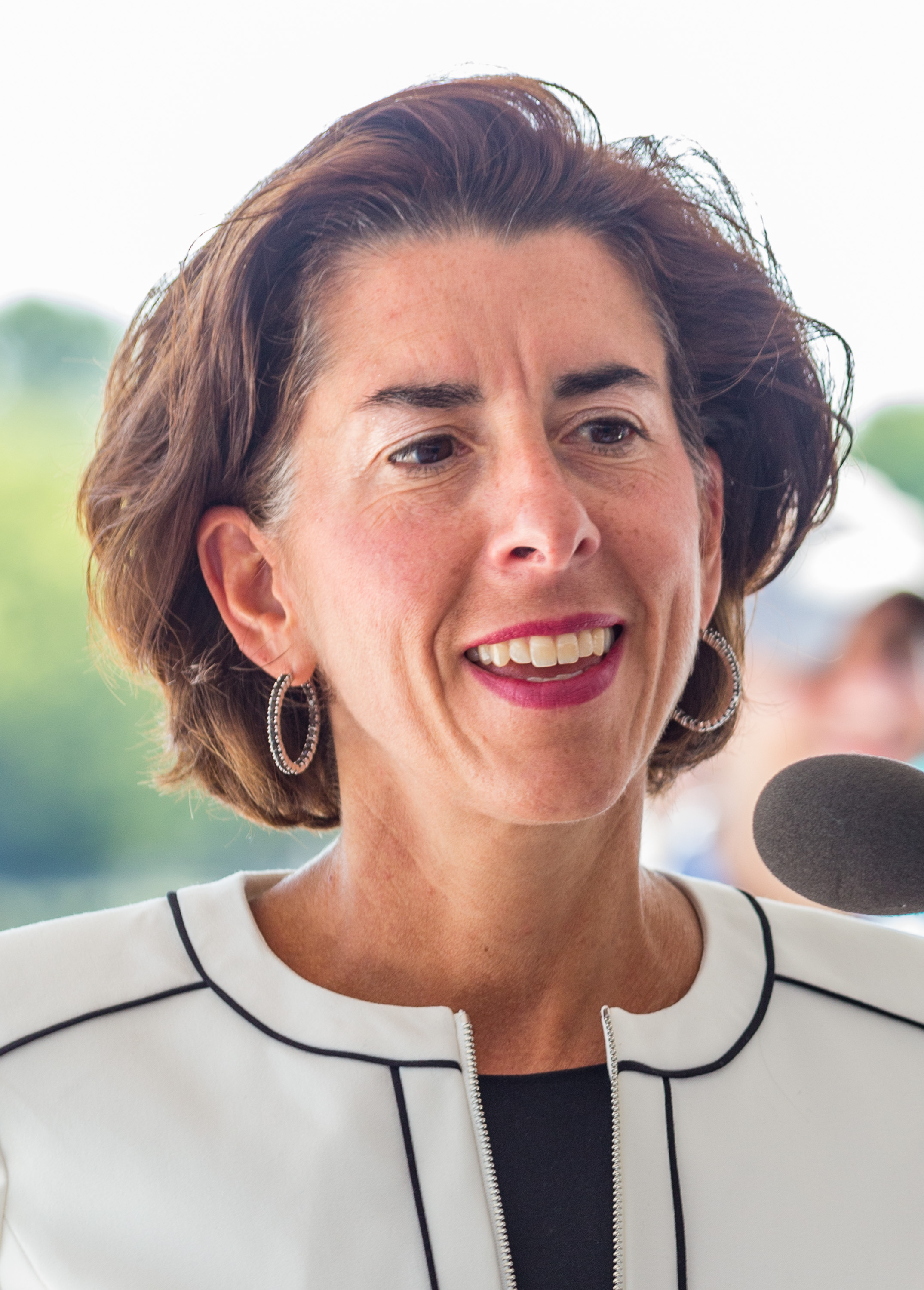
Gina Raimondo

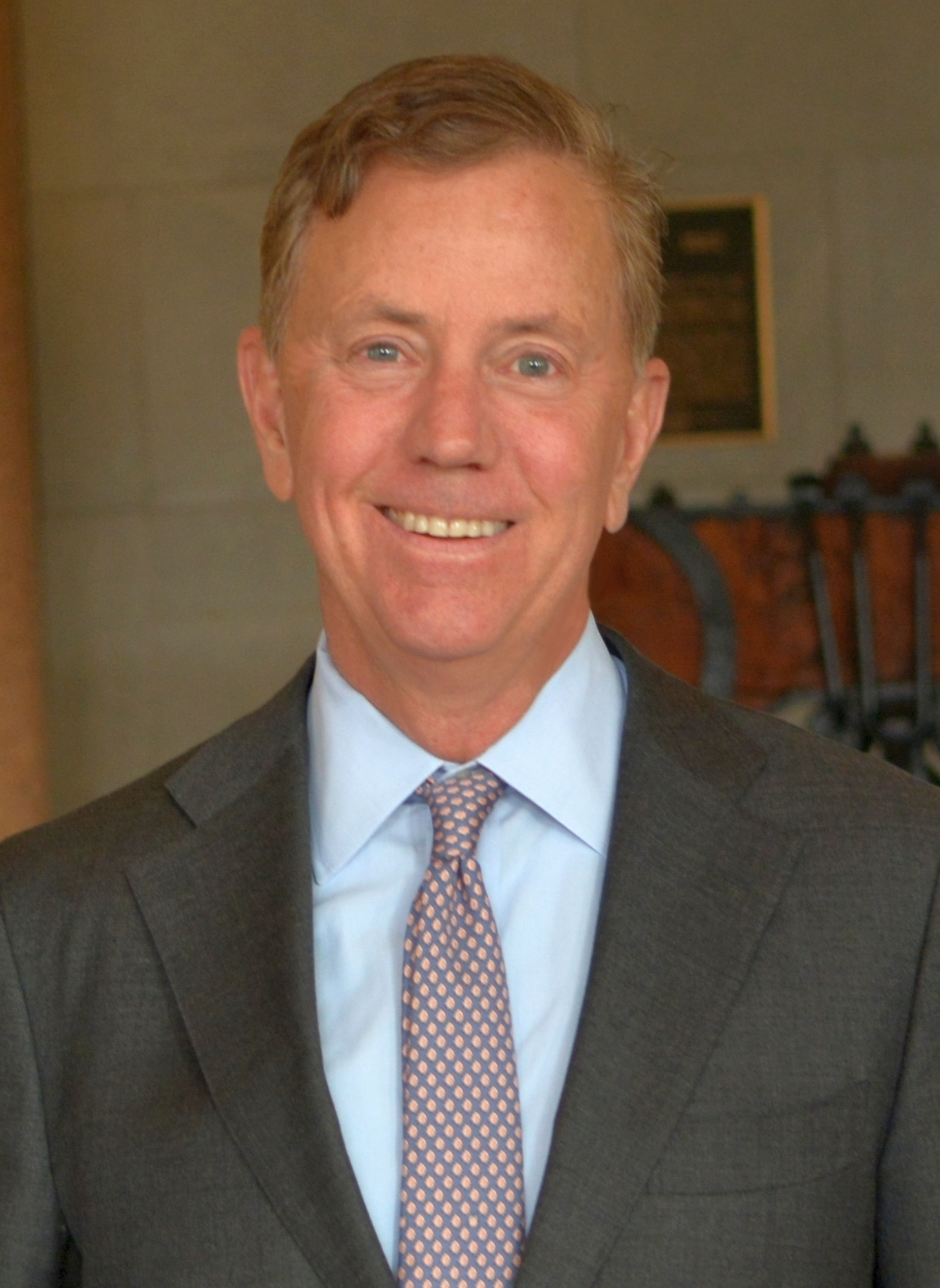
Ned Lamont

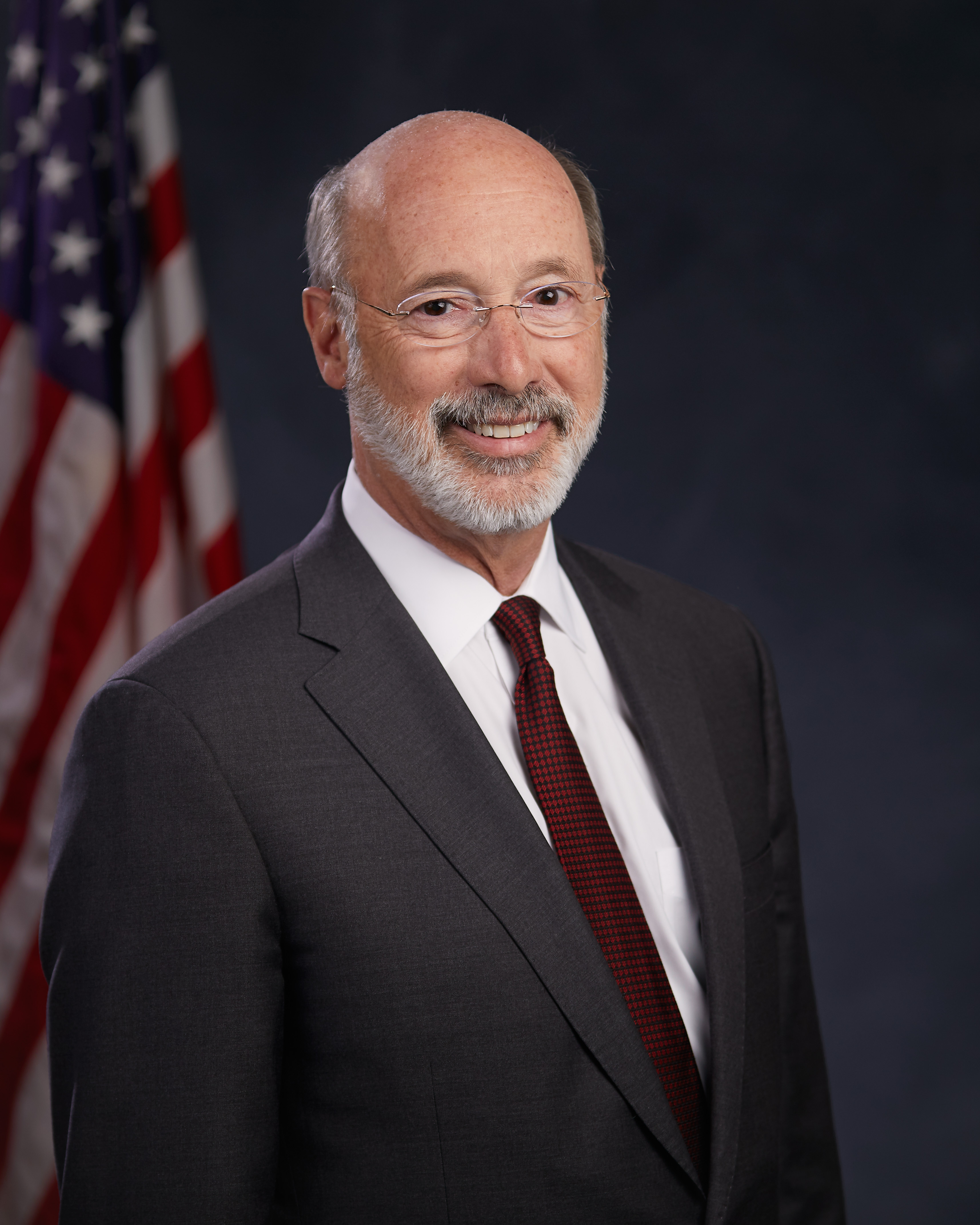
Tom Wolf

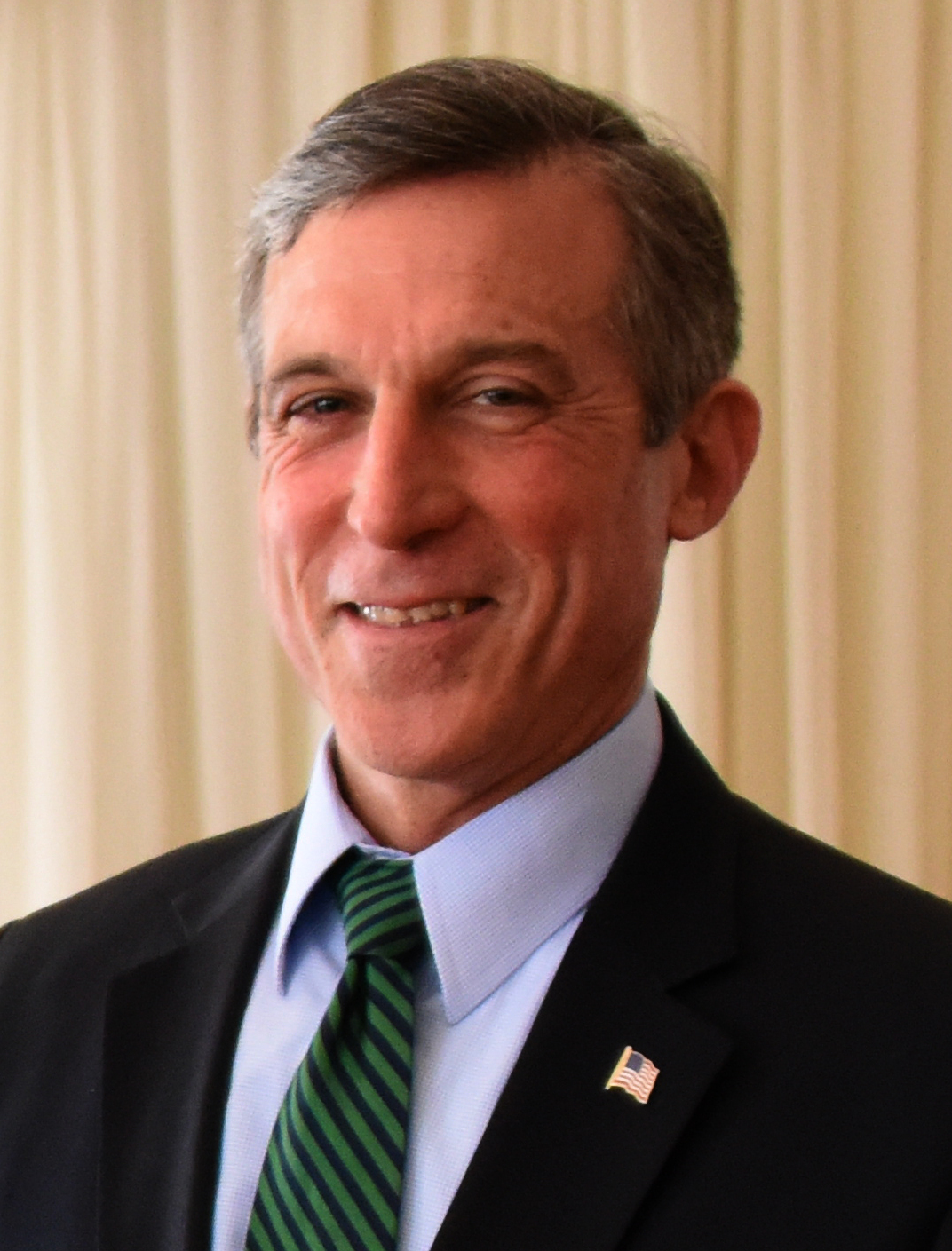
John Carney

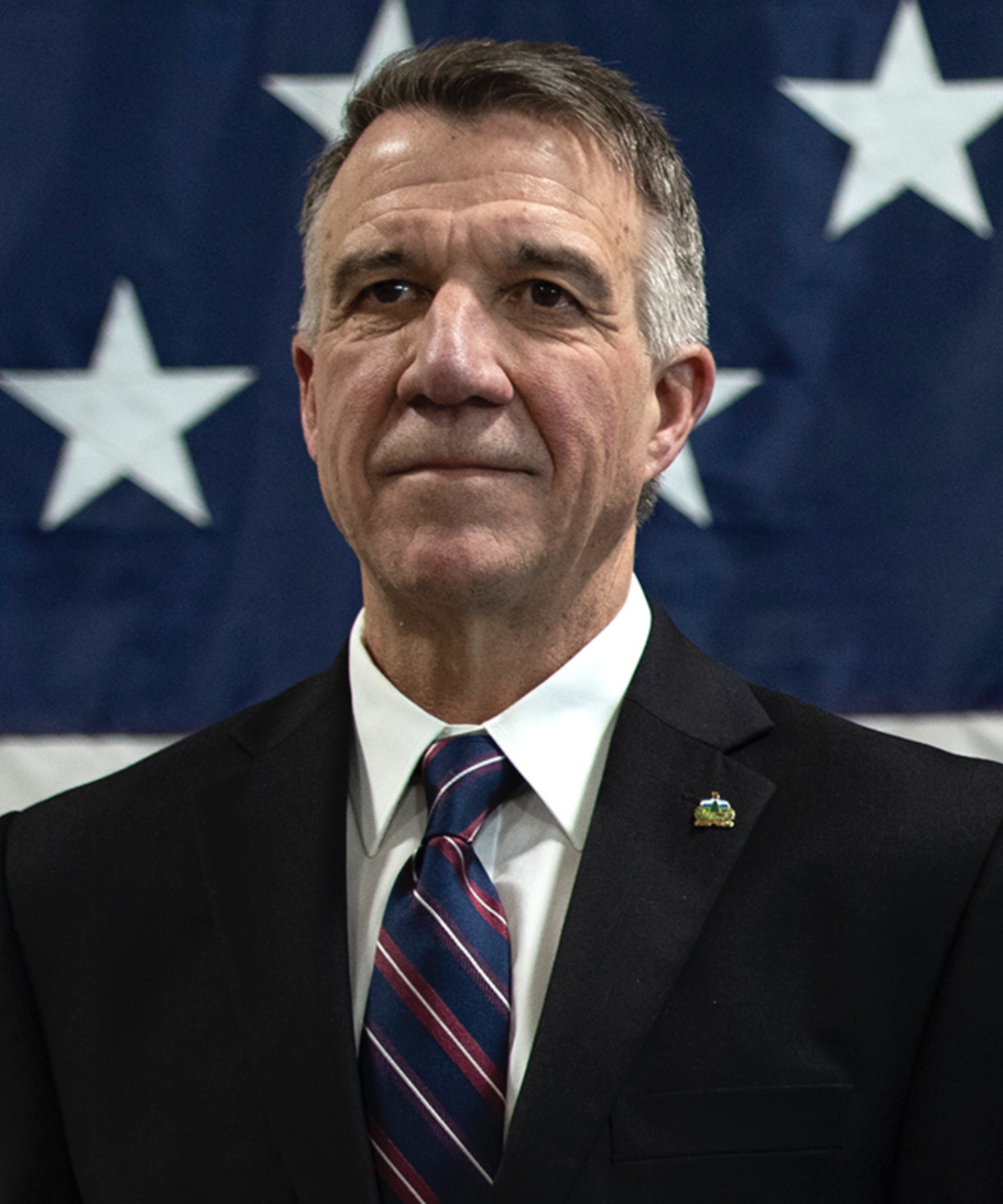
Phil Scott

- Andy Beshear, governor of Kentucky (2019–present), attorney general of Kentucky (2016–2019)
- Muriel Bowser, mayor of the District of Columbia (2015–present) (governor-equivalent) (Note: Previously endorsed Michael Bloomberg.)
- Kate Brown, governor of Oregon (2015–2023), secretary of state of Oregon (2009–2015)
- Albert Bryan, governor of the United States Virgin Islands (2019–present)
- Steve Bullock, governor of Montana (2013–2021), 2020 nominee for Senate, 2020 candidate for president, chair of the National Governors Association (2018–2019), Attorney General of Montana (2009–2013)
- John Carney, governor of Delaware (2017–2025), U.S. representative from DE-AL (2011–2017)
- Roy Cooper, governor of North Carolina (2017–2025), attorney general of North Carolina (2001–2017)
- Andrew Cuomo, governor of New York (2011–2021), chair of the National Governors Association (2020–2021), attorney general of New York (2007–2010), U.S. Secretary of Housing and Urban Development (1997–2001)
- John Bel Edwards, governor of Louisiana (2016–2024), minority leader of the Louisiana House of Representatives (2012–2015), member of the Louisiana House of Representatives 72nd district (2008–2015)
- Tony Evers, governor of Wisconsin (2019–present), Superintendent of Public Instruction of Wisconsin (2009–2019)
- Michelle Lujan Grisham, governor of New Mexico (2019–present), U.S. representative from NM-01 (2013–2019)
- Lou Leon Guerrero, governor of Guam (2019–present), senator of the Guam Legislature (1995–2005)
- Jay Inslee, governor of Washington (2013–2025), U.S. representative for WA-01 (1999–2012) and WA-04 (1993–1995), 2020 candidate for president
- Ned Lamont, governor of Connecticut (2019–present)
- Janet Mills, governor of Maine (2019–present), Attorney General of Maine (2013–2019)
- Lolo Matalasi Moliga, governor of American Samoa (2013–2021)
- Phil Murphy, governor of New Jersey (2018–2026) (Note: Previously endorsed Cory Booker.)
- Gavin Newsom, governor of California (2019–present), lieutenant governor of California (2011–2019), mayor of San Francisco, California (2004–2011)
- Ralph Northam, governor of Virginia (2018–2022), lieutenant governor of Virginia (2014–2018), member of the Virginia Senate from the 6th district (2008–2014)
- Jared Polis, governor of Colorado (2019–present), U.S. representative from CO-02 (2009–2019)
- J. B. Pritzker, governor of Illinois (2019–present)
- Gina Raimondo, governor of Rhode Island (2015–2021), treasurer of Rhode Island (2011–2015)
- Phil Scott, governor of Vermont (2017–present), lieutenant governor of Vermont (2011–2017) (Republican)
- Steve Sisolak, governor of Nevada (2019–2023), chair of the Clark County Commission (2013–2019)
- Tim Walz, governor of Minnesota (2019–present), U.S. representative from MN-01 (2007–2019)
- Gretchen Whitmer, governor of Michigan (2019–present), minority leader of the Michigan Senate (2011–2015) (national co-chair)
- Tom Wolf, governor of Pennsylvania (2015–2023), Secretary of Revenue of Pennsylvania (2007–2008)

==== Tribal leaders and governor-equivalent officials ====
- Gabe Aguilar, president of the Mescalero Apache Tribe
- W. Ron Allen, chairman of the Jamestown S'Klallam Tribe of Washington (1977–present)
- Ricky Armstrong, president of the Seneca Nation of New York
- Floyd Azure, chairman of the Fort Peck Indian Reservation (2015–2023)
- Jamie Azure, chairman of the Turtle Mountain Band of Chippewa Indians (2018–present)
- Melanie Benjamin, chief executive of the Mille Lacs Band of Ojibwe (2000–2008, 2012–present)
- Devon Boyer, chairman of the Shoshone-Bannock of Fort Hall
- Shelley Buck, president of the Prairie Island Indian Community
- Rodney Butler, chair of the Mashantucket Pequot Tribe (2010–present)
- Frances Charles, chairwoman of the Lower Elwha Klallam Tribe
- E. Ken Choke, chairman of the Nisqually Reservation
- Michael Conners, chief of the St. Regis Mohawk Reservation
- Cedric Cromwell, tribal council chairman of the Mashpee Wampanoag Tribe (2009–2020)
- Carol Evans, chairwoman of the Spokane Tribe of Indians
- Leonard Forsman, chairman of the Suquamish Tribe
- Mark Fox, chairman of the Mandan, Hidatsa, and Arikara Nation
- Harold Frazier, chairman of the Cheyenne River Indian Reservation (2014–2022)
- Teri Gobin, chairwoman of the Tulalip (2019–present)
- Shannon Holsey, president of the Stockbridge–Munsee Community (2015–present)
- Delbert Hopkins, chairman of the Sisseton Wahpeton Oyate
- Michael Hunter, Tribal Chairman of the Coyote Valley Band of Pomo Indians (2013–present)
- Faron Jackson, chairman of the Leech Lake Band of Ojibwe (2016–present)
- Norma Jean, chairwoman of the Sauk-Suiattle Indian Tribe of Washington
- Kenneth Kahn, chairman of the Santa Ynez Band of Chumash Mission Indians
- Stephen Roe Lewis, governor of the Gila River Indian Community (2014–present)
- Mark Macarro, chairman of the Pechanga Band of Luiseño Indians
- Marilynn Malerba, chief of the Mohegan Tribe (2010–present)
- Margie Mejia, chairwoman of the Lytton Band of Pomo Indians
- Robert Miguel, council chairman of the Ak-Chin Indian Community (2017–present)
- Guy Miller, chairman of the Skokomish Indian Tribe
- Bryan Newland, president of the Bay Mills Indian Community (2017–2021), Assistant Secretary of the Interior for Indian Affairs (2021–present)
- Jonathan Nez, president of the Navajo Nation (2019–2023)
- Ned Norris Jr., chairman of the Tohono Oʼodham Nation (2007–2015, 2019–2023)
- Timothy Nuvangyaoma, chairman of the Hopi Reservation (2017–present)
- Dennis Patch, chairman of the Colorado River Indian Tribes (2018–2020)
- Aaron Payment, Governor of the Sault Tribe of Chippewa Indians (2004–2008, 2012–present)
- Bob Peters, chairperson of the Match-e-be-nash-she-wish Band of Pottawatomi Indians of Michigan (2018–present)
- Marshall Pierite, chairman of the Tunica-Biloxi (2018–present)
- Erica Pinto, chairwoman of the Jamul Indian Village (2015–present)
- Rhonda Pitka, first chief of Beaver Village
- Julian R. President, president of the Oglala Lakota Nation
- Terry Rambler, chairman of the San Carlos Apache Indian Reservation
- Delano Saluskin, chairman of the Yakama Indian Reservation (2020–present)
- Darrell G. Seki Sr., chairman of the Red Lake Indian Reservation
- Fawn Sharp, president of the Quinault Indian Nation (2019–2023)
- Lawrence Solomon, chairman of the Lummi Nation
- Lee Spoonhunter, chairman of the Northern Arapaho Tribe
- Bill Sterud, chairman of the Puyallup Tribe of Indians
- Patrick Suarez, councilman of the Meherrin Nation
- Warren Swartz, tribal president of the Keweenaw Bay Indian Community (2018–present)
- Edward Thomas, president of the Tlingit Haida Indian Tribes of Alaska
- Amber Torres, chairwoman of the Walker River Paiute Tribe
- Mike Williams, chair of the Akiak Native Community
- Thomas Wooten, chairman of the Samish Indian Nation

=== Former governors ===
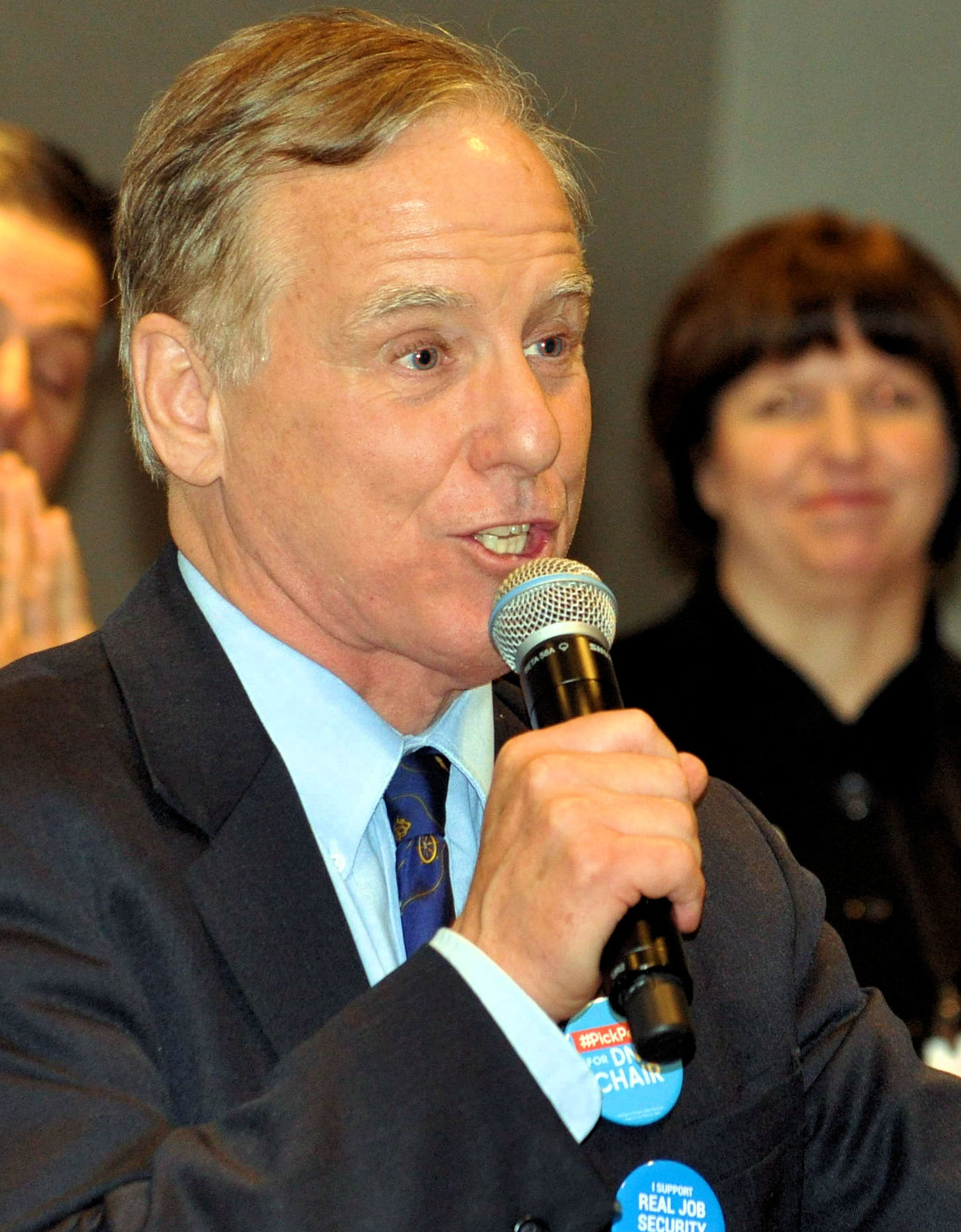
Howard Dean

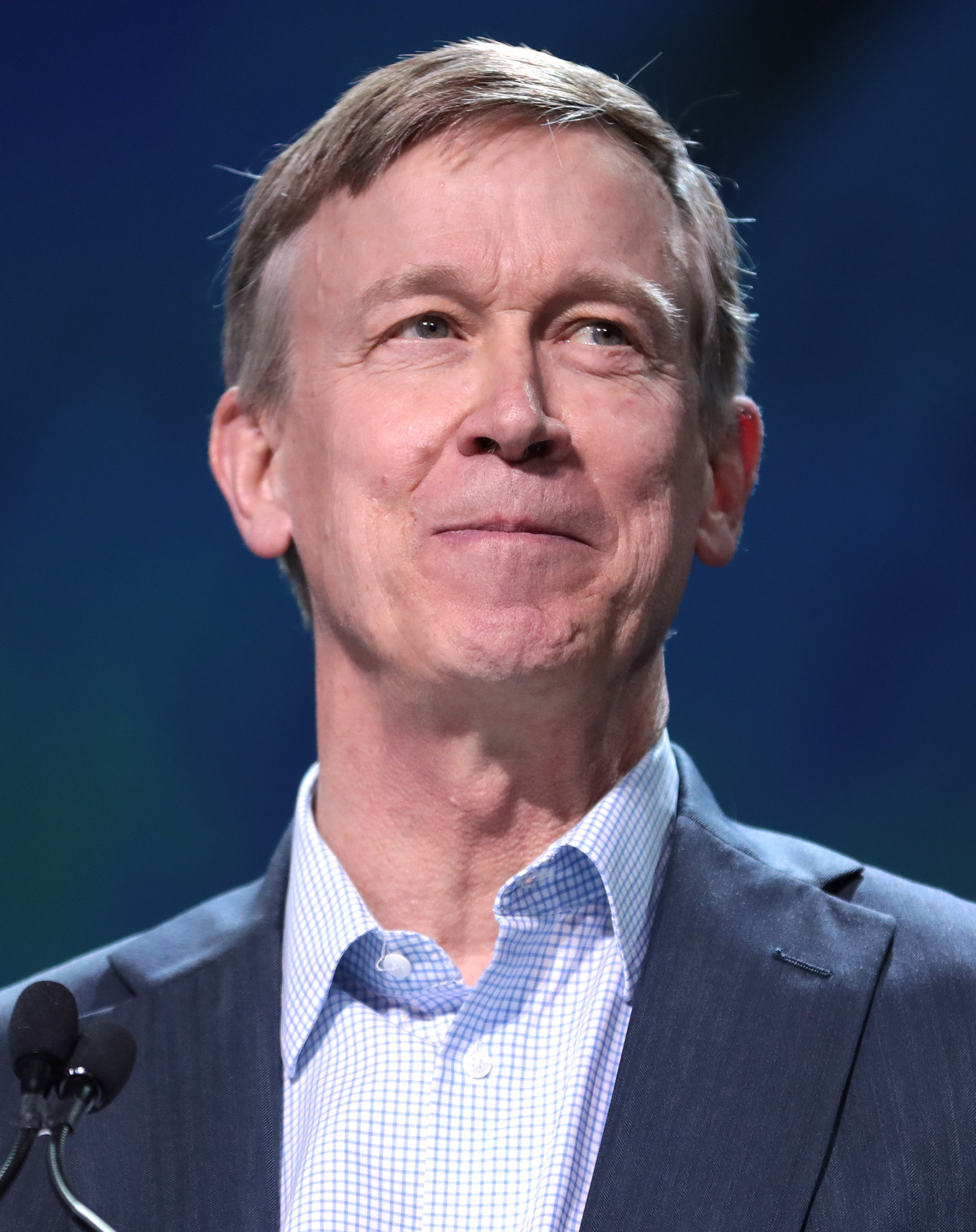
John Hickenlooper

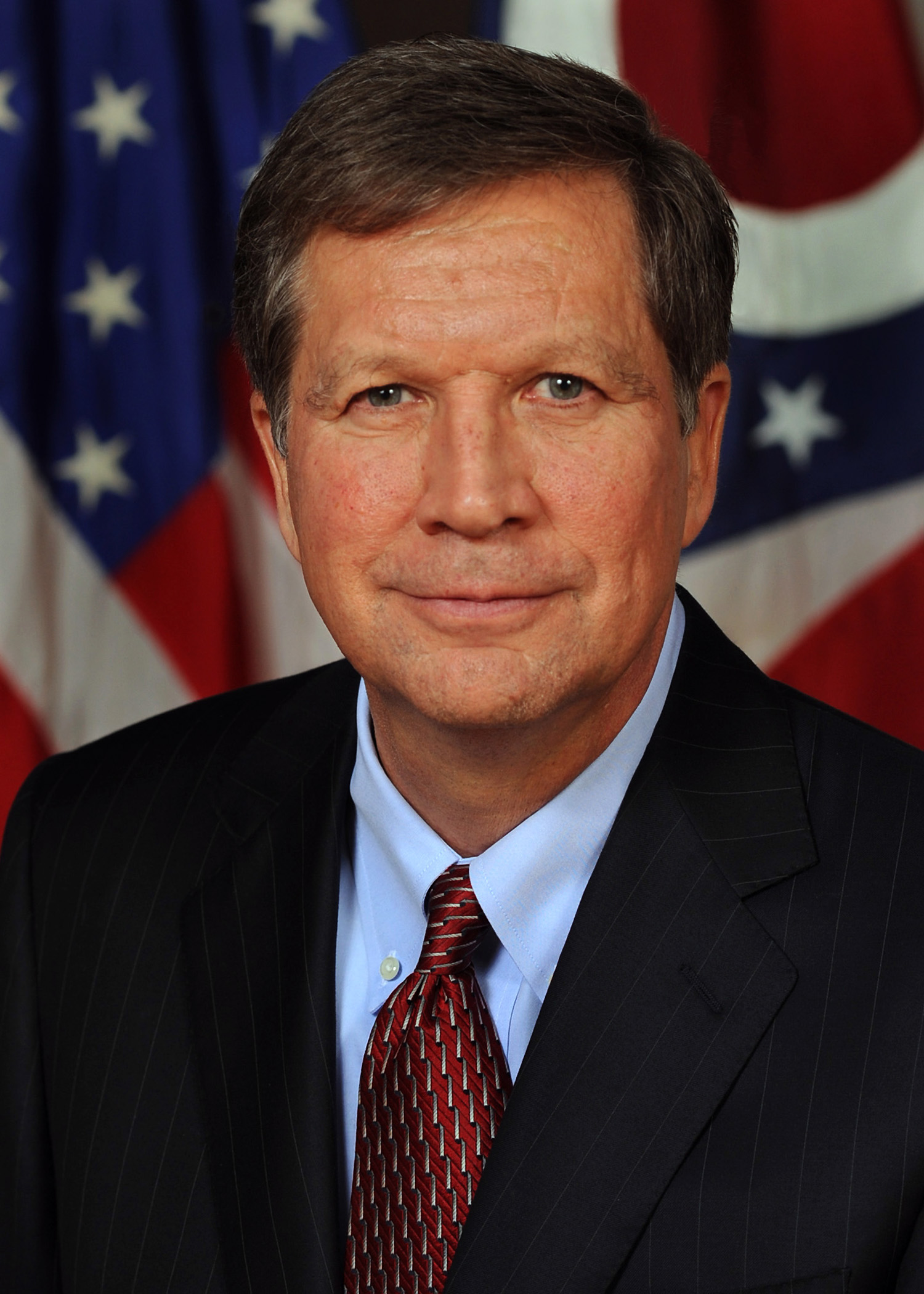
John Kasich

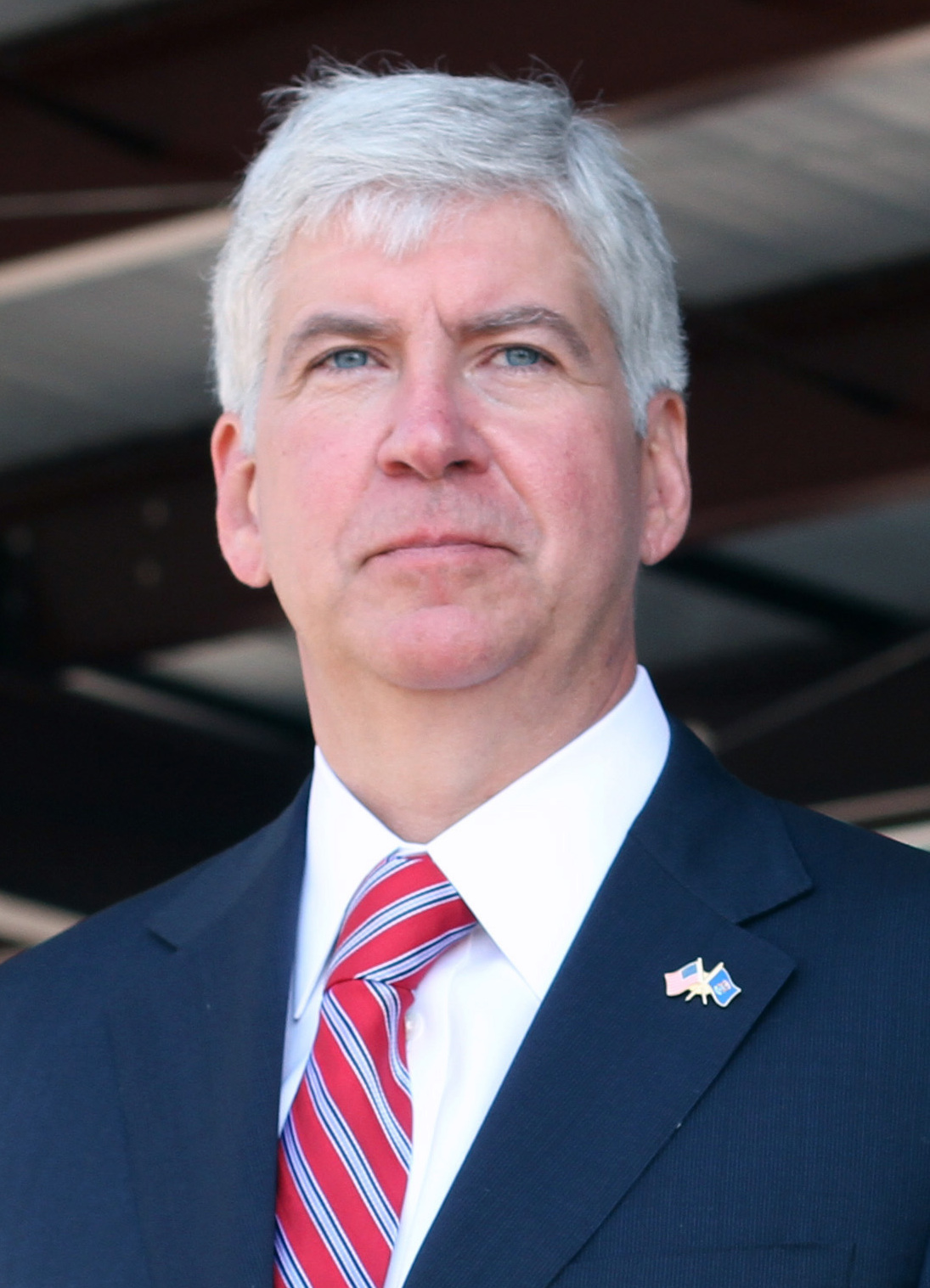
Rick Snyder

- George Ariyoshi, governor of Hawaii (1973–1986), lieutenant governor of Hawaii (1970–1974)
- John Baldacci, governor of Maine (2003–11), U.S. representative from ME-02 (1995–2003), Member of the Maine Senate from the 9th district (1982–94)
- Roy Barnes, governor of Georgia (1999–2003)
- Steve Beshear, governor of Kentucky (2007–2015), lieutenant governor of Kentucky (1983–1987), Attorney General of Kentucky (1979–1983)
- Jerry Brown, governor of California (1975–1983, 2011–2019), Attorney General of California (2007–2011), mayor of Oakland, California (1999–2007), Secretary of State of California (1971–1975), 1976, 1980, and 1992 candidate for president
- John W. Carlin, governor of Kansas (1979–1987), chair of the National Governors Association (1984–1985), Archivist of the United States (1995–2005)
- Arne Carlson, governor of Minnesota (1991–1999), Minnesota State Auditor (1979–1991) (Republican)
- Ben Cayetano, governor of Hawaii (1994–2002), lieutenant governor of Hawaii (1986–1994)
- Richard J. Codey, governor of New Jersey (2004–2006), president of the New Jersey Senate (2002–2010)
- Jon Corzine, governor of New Jersey (2006–2010), U.S. senator from New Jersey (2001–2006)
- Chet Culver, governor of Iowa (2007–2011), Secretary of State of Iowa (1999–2007)
- Gray Davis, governor of California (1999–2003), lieutenant governor of California (1995–1999)
- Mark Dayton, governor of Minnesota (2011–2019), U.S. senator from Minnesota (2001–2007), Minnesota State Auditor (1991–1995)
- Howard Dean, governor of Vermont (1991–2003), chair of the Democratic National Committee (2005–2009), chair of the National Governors Association (1994–1995), lieutenant governor of Vermont (1987–1991), 2004 candidate for president
- Jim Doyle, governor of Wisconsin (2003–2011), Attorney General of Wisconsin (1991–2003)
- Michael Dukakis, governor of Massachusetts (1975–1979, 1983–1991), 1988 nominee for president
- Mike Easley, governor of North Carolina (2001–2009), attorney general of North Carolina (1993–2001)
- Jim Edgar, governor of Illinois (1991–1999), Secretary of State of Illinois (1981–1991) (Republican)
- Alejandro García Padilla, governor of Puerto Rico (2013–2017)
- Parris Glendening, governor of Maryland (1995–2003), chair of the National Governors Association (2000–2001)
- Jennifer Granholm, governor of Michigan (2003–2011), Attorney General of Michigan (1999–2003)
- Bill Graves, governor of Kansas (1995–2003) (Republican)
- Christine Gregoire, governor of Washington (2005–2013), chair of the National Governors Association (2010–2011), attorney general of Washington (1993–2005)
- John Hickenlooper, chair of the National Governors Association (2014–2015), governor of Colorado (2011–2019), mayor of Denver, Colorado (2003–2011), 2020 candidate for president and 2020 nominee for Senate
- Jim Hodges, governor of South Carolina (1999–2003)
- Bob Holden, governor of Missouri (2001–2005), State Treasurer of Missouri (1993–2001)
- Jim Hunt, governor of North Carolina (1977–1985, 1993–2001), lieutenant governor of North Carolina (1973–1977)
- John Kasich, governor of Ohio (2011–2019), 2016 candidate for president (Republican)
- Tony Knowles, governor of Alaska (1994–2004) mayor of Anchorage, Alaska (1981–1987)
- Ted Kulongoski, governor of Oregon (2003–2011), associate justice of the Oregon Supreme Court (1997–2001), attorney general of Oregon (1993–1997)
- John Lynch, governor of New Hampshire (2005–2013)
- Dannel Malloy, governor of Connecticut (2011–2019), mayor of Stamford (1995–2009)
- Jack Markell, Governor of Delaware (2009–2017), chair of the National Governors Association (2012–2013)
- Terry McAuliffe, governor of Virginia (2014–2018), chair of the National Governors Association (2016–2017)
- Jim McGreevey, governor of New Jersey (2002–2004), mayor of Woodbridge Township, New Jersey (1992–2002)
- Bob Miller, governor of Nevada (1989–1999), chair of the National Governors Association (1989–1999)
- Ronnie Musgrove, governor of Mississippi (2000–2004), lieutenant governor of Mississippi (1996–2000)
- Jay Nixon, governor of Missouri (2009–2017), Attorney General of Missouri (1993–2009)
- Martin O'Malley, governor of Maryland (2007–2015), 2016 candidate for president (previously endorsed Beto O'Rourke) (Note: Previously endorsed another candidate.)
- Deval Patrick, governor of Massachusetts (2007–2015), 2020 candidate for president
- Pat Quinn, governor of Illinois (2009–2015), lieutenant governor of Illinois (2003–2009), treasurer of Illinois (1991–1995)
- Marc Racicot, governor of Montana (1993–2001), Attorney General of Montana (1989–1993), chair of the Republican National Committee (2001–2003) (Republican)
- Ed Rendell, governor of Pennsylvania (2003–2011), chair of the National Governors Association (2008–2009), general chair of the Democratic National Committee (1999–2001)
- Bill Ritter, governor of Colorado (2007–2011), District Attorney of Denver (1993–2005) (previously endorsed Michael Bennet)
- Roy Romer, governor of Colorado (1987–1999), general chair of the Democratic National Committee (1997–1999), chair of the National Governors Association (1992–1993)
- Bill Sheffield, governor of Alaska (1982–1986)
- Peter Shumlin, governor of Vermont (2011–2017)
- Don Siegelman, governor of Alabama (1999–2003), lieutenant governor of Alabama (1995–1999), Attorney General of Alabama (1987–1991), Secretary of State of Alabama (1979–1987)
- Rick Snyder, Governor of Michigan (2011–2019) (Republican)
- John D. Waihe'e III, governor of Hawaii (1986–1994), lieutenant governor of Hawaii (1982–1986)
- Peterson Zah, president of the Navajo Nation (1991–1995) (governor-equivalent)

=== Lieutenant governors ===
==== Current state and territorial ====
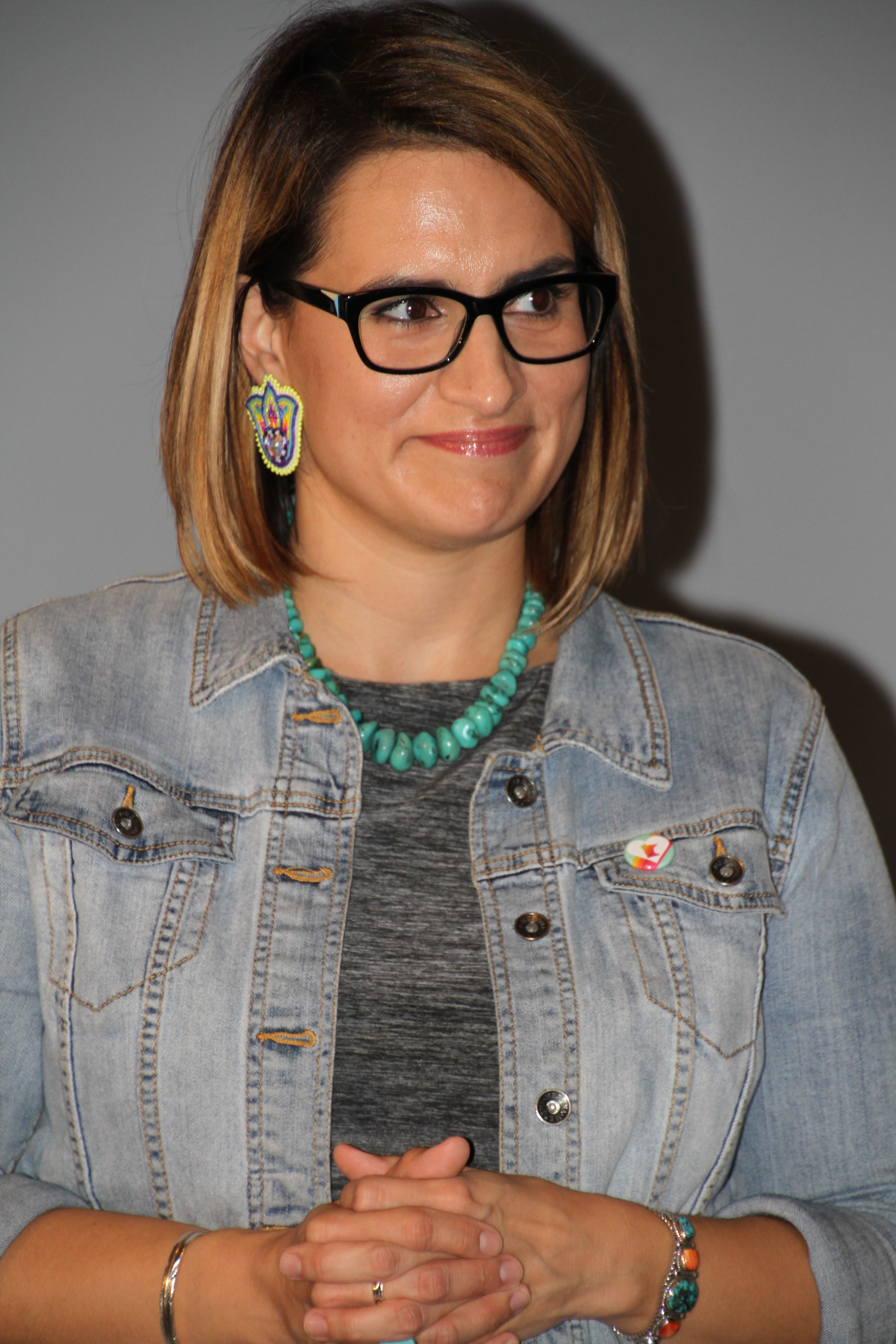
Peggy Flanagan

- Mandela Barnes, lieutenant governor of Wisconsin (2019–2023)
- Susan Bysiewicz, lieutenant governor of Connecticut (2019–present), Secretary of State of Connecticut (1999–2011)
- John Fetterman, lieutenant governor of Pennsylvania (2019–2023), mayor of Braddock, Pennsylvania (2005–2019)
- Peggy Flanagan, lieutenant governor of Minnesota (2019–present)
- Garlin Gilchrist, lieutenant governor of Michigan (2019–present)
- Kathy Hochul, lieutenant governor of New York (2015–2021)
- Eleni Kounalakis, lieutenant governor of California (2019–present)
- Kate Marshall, lieutenant governor of Nevada (2019–2021), Treasurer of Nevada (2007–2015)
- Daniel McKee, lieutenant governor of Rhode Island (2015–2021)
- Sheila Oliver, lieutenant governor of New Jersey (2018–2023)
- Juliana Stratton, lieutenant governor of Illinois (2019–present)
- Josh Tenorio, lieutenant governor of Guam (2019–present)
- David Zuckerman, lieutenant governor of Vermont (2017–2021, 2023–2025), 2020 nominee for governor of Vermont (Vermont Progressive)

==== Current tribal ====
- Jason Cooke, vice chairman of the Yankton Sioux Tribe (2017–present)
- Jefferson Keel, lieutenant governor emeritus of the Chickasaw Nation (2019–2021), lieutenant governor of the Chickasaw Nation (1999–2019)
- Jodie Palmer, vice chair of the Match-e-be-nash-she-wish Band of Pottawatomi Indians of Michigan (2017–present)
- Wendy Schlater, vice chairwoman of the La Jolla Band of Luiseno Indians (2013–2024), chairwoman of the La Jolla Band of Luiseno Indians (2024–present)
- Richard Silliboy, vice chief of the Miꞌkmaq
- Brandon Yellowtail Stevens, vice-chairman of Oneida Nation of Wisconsin
- Clark Tenakhongva, vice chair of the Hopi Reservation (2009–2021)

==== Former ====
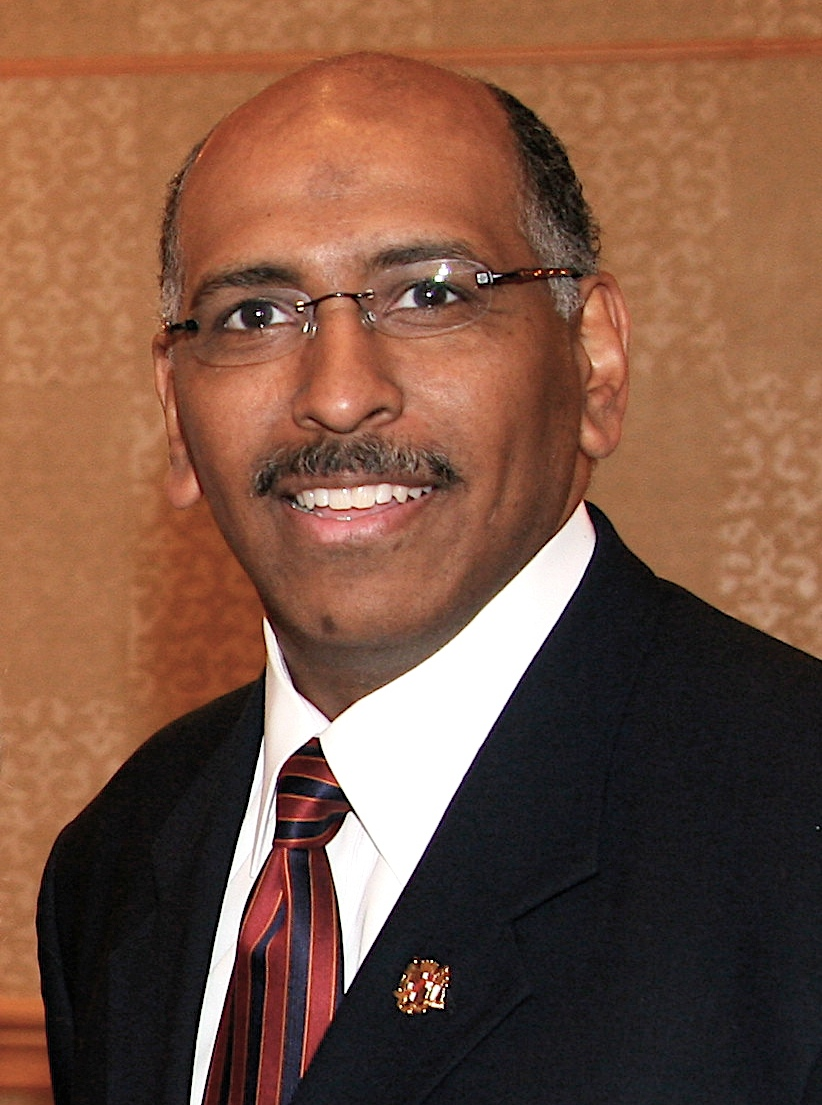
Michael Steele

- Bill Baxley, lieutenant governor of Alabama (1983–1987), Attorney General of Alabama (1971–1979)
- Doug Chin, lieutenant governor of Hawaii (2018), attorney general of Hawaii (2015–2018)
- Kathy Davis, lieutenant governor of Indiana (2003–2005)
- Lee Fisher, dean of Cleveland–Marshall College of Law (2017–present), Lieutenant Governor of Ohio (2007–2011), attorney general of Ohio (1991–1995)
- Jefferson Keel, lieutenant governor of Chickasaw Nation (1999–2019) (lieutenant governor-equivalent)
- Kathleen Kennedy Townsend, lieutenant governor of Maryland (1995–2003)
- John Mutz, lieutenant governor of Indiana (1981–1989) (Republican)
- Barbara O'Brien, lieutenant governor of Colorado (2007–2011)
- Thomas P. O'Neill III, lieutenant governor of Massachusetts (1975–1983)
- Michael Steele, lieutenant governor of Maryland (2003–2007), chair of the Republican National Committee (2009–2011), chair of the Maryland Republican Party (2000–2002) (Republican)
- Shan Tsutsui, lieutenant governor of Hawaii (2012–2018)
- Fran Ulmer, lieutenant governor of Alaska (1994–2002), mayor of Juneau, Alaska (1983–1985)

=== Secretaries of state ===
==== Current state and territorial ====
- Jocelyn Benson, Secretary of State of Michigan (2019–present), dean of the Wayne State University Law School (2012–2016)
- Alex Padilla, Secretary of State of California (2015–2021)
- Jesse White, Secretary of State of Illinois (1999–2023)

==== Tribal ====
- Michelle Beaudin, secretary-treasurer of the Lac Courte Oreilles Tribe (2019–present)
- Jeff Martin, secretary of the Match-e-be-nash-she-wish Band of Pottawatomi Indians of Michigan (2016–present)
- Christie Modlin, tribal secretary of the Iowa Tribe of Oklahoma, former chairman

==== Former ====
- Robin Carnahan, Secretary of State of Missouri (2005–2013)
- Jason Kander, Secretary of State of Missouri (2013–2017)
- Kathy Karpan, Secretary of State of Wyoming (1987–1995)
- John P. McDonough, Secretary of State of Maryland (2008–2015)

=== Attorneys general ===
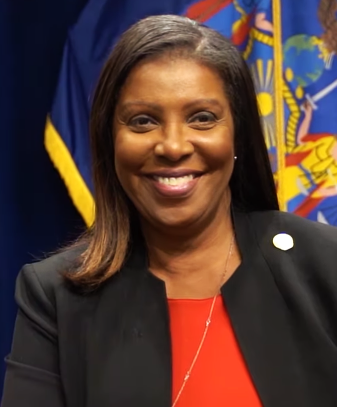
Letitia James

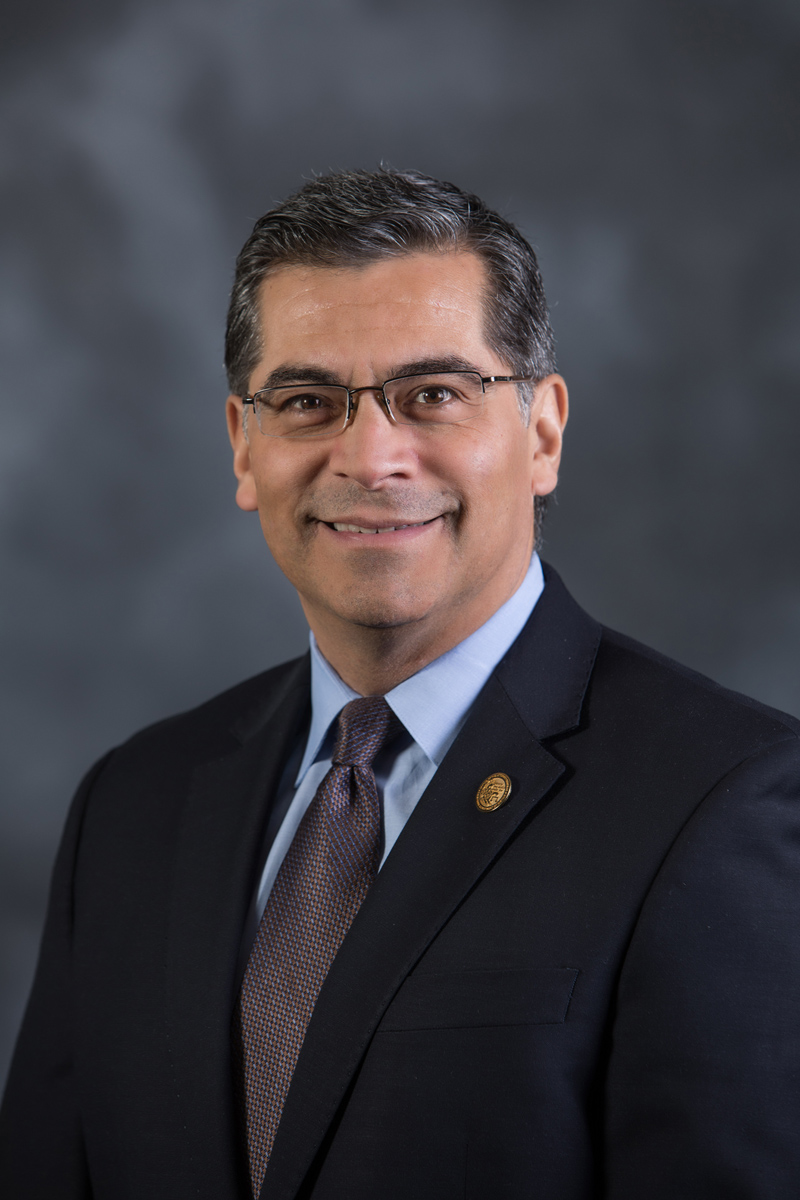
Xavier Becerra

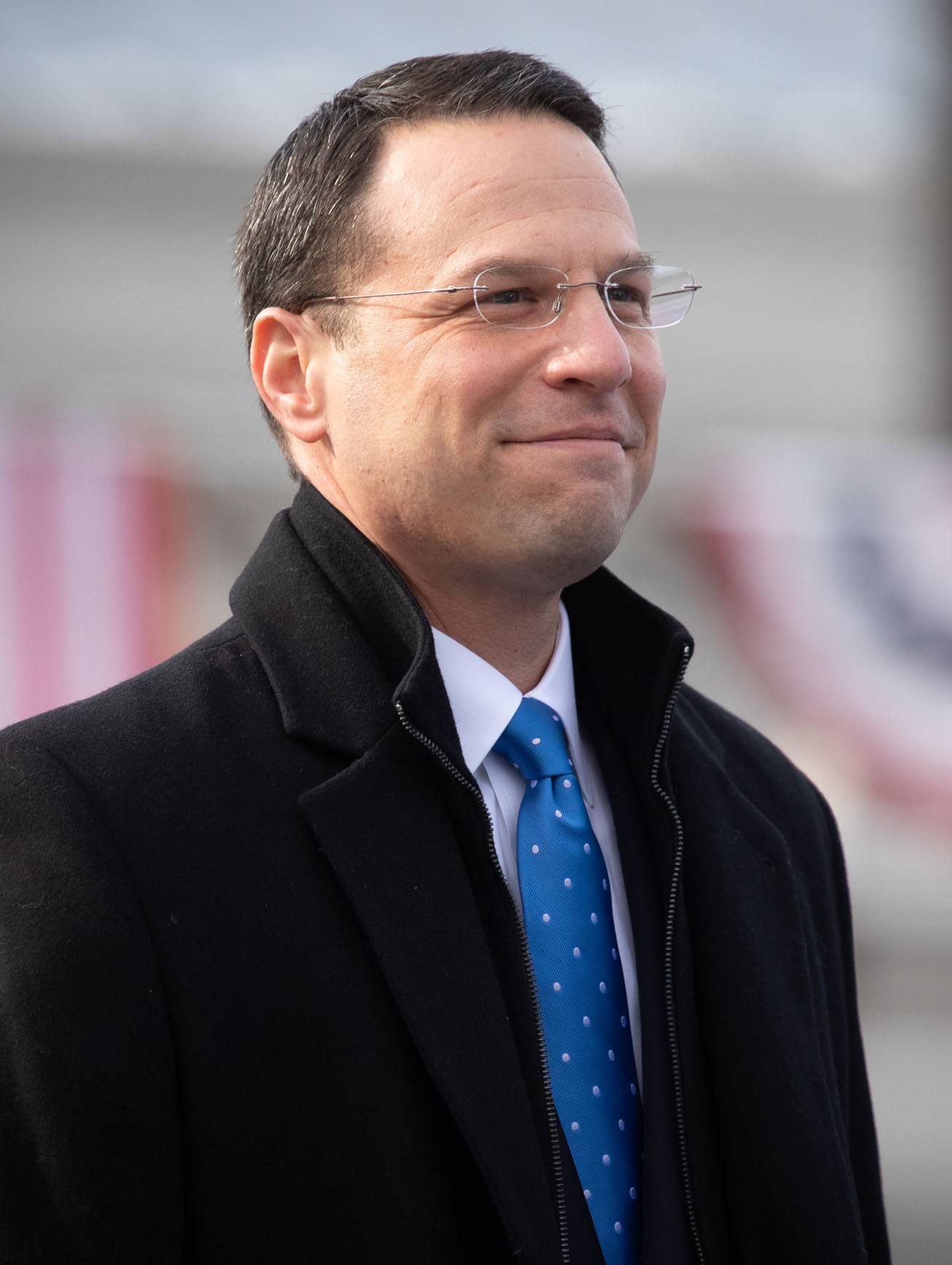
Josh Shapiro

==== Current ====
- Hector Balderas, attorney general of New Mexico (2015–2023), New Mexico State Auditor (2007–2015)
- Xavier Becerra, attorney general of California (2017–2021), House Democratic Assistant to the Leader (2007–2009), U.S. representative from CA-34 (2013–2017), CA-31 (2003–2013), and CA-30 (1993–2003)
- T. J. Donovan, attorney general of Vermont (2017–2022)
- Keith Ellison, attorney general of Minnesota (2019–present), U.S. representative from MN-05 (2007–2019)
- Bob Ferguson, attorney general of Washington (2013–2025), governor of Washington (2025–present)
- Aaron D. Ford, attorney general of Nevada (2019–present), majority leader (2016–2018) and minority leader (2014–2016) of the Nevada Senate
- Aaron Frey, attorney general of Maine (2019–present)
- Brian Frosh, attorney general of Maryland (2015–2023)
- Gurbir Grewal, attorney general of New Jersey (2018–2021), director of the Division of Enforcement for the SEC (2021–present)
- Maura Healey, attorney general of Massachusetts (2015–2023), governor of Massachusetts (2023–present)
- Mark Herring, attorney general of Virginia (2014–2022)
- Letitia James, attorney general of New York (2019–present)
- Kathy Jennings, attorney general of Delaware (2019–present)
- Josh Kaul, attorney general of Wisconsin (2019–present)
- Tom Miller, attorney general of Iowa (1995–2023, 1979–1991) (previously endorsed Steve Bullock)
- Peter Neronha, attorney general of Rhode Island (2019–present), U.S. Attorney for the District of Rhode Island (2009–2017)
- Dana Nessel, attorney general of Michigan (2019–present)
- Karl Racine, attorney general of the District of Columbia (2015–2023)
- Kwame Raoul, attorney general of Illinois (2019–present)
- Ellen Rosenblum, attorney general of Oregon (2012–2024)
- Josh Shapiro, attorney general of Pennsylvania (2017–2023), governor of Pennsylvania (2023–present)
- Josh Stein, attorney general of North Carolina (2017–2025), governor of North Carolina (2025–present)
- William Tong, attorney general of Connecticut (2019–present)
- Phil Weiser, attorney general of Colorado (2019–present), dean of the University of Colorado Law School (2011–2016)

==== Former ====
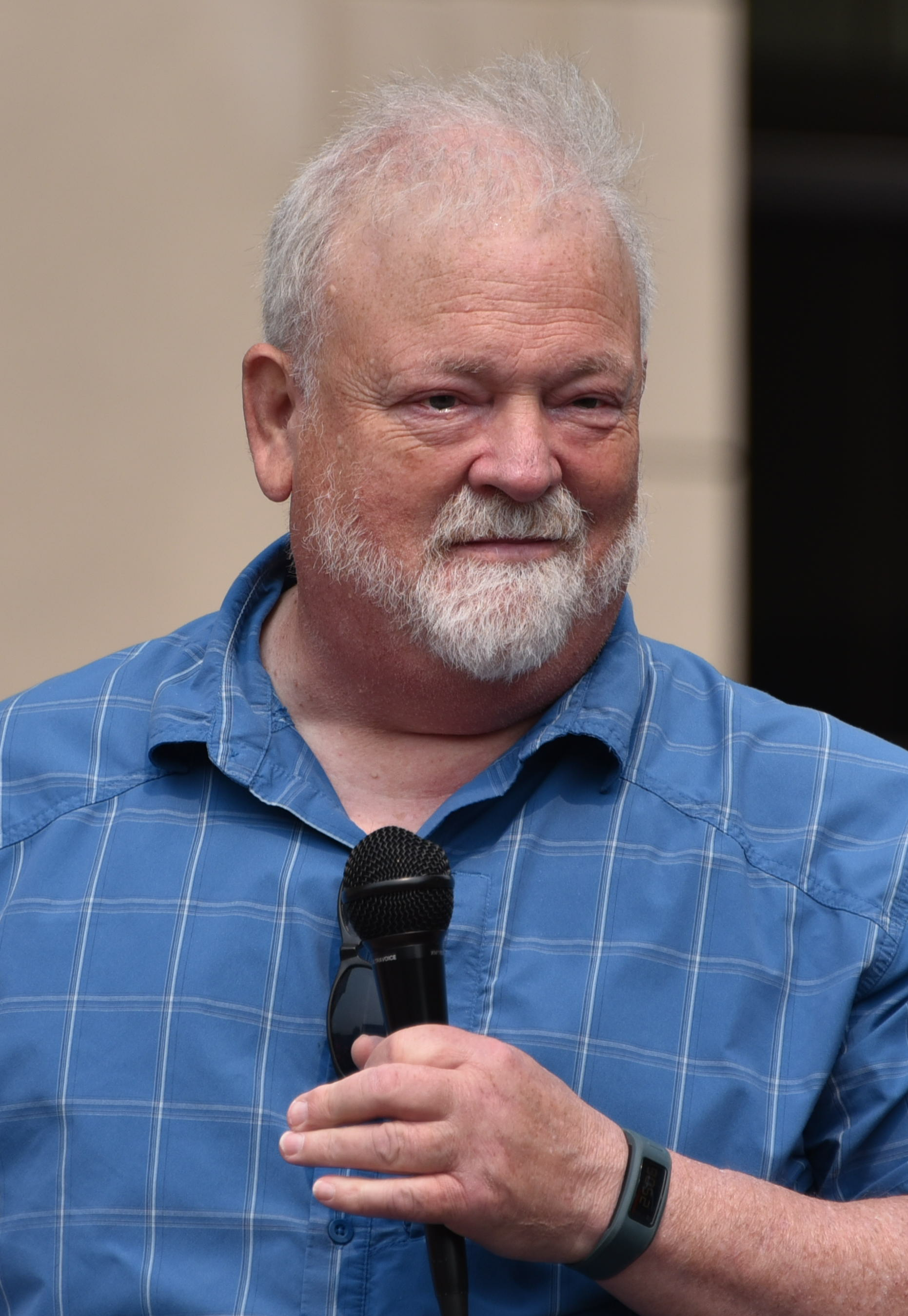
Bruce Botelho

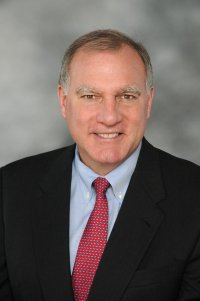
George Jepsen

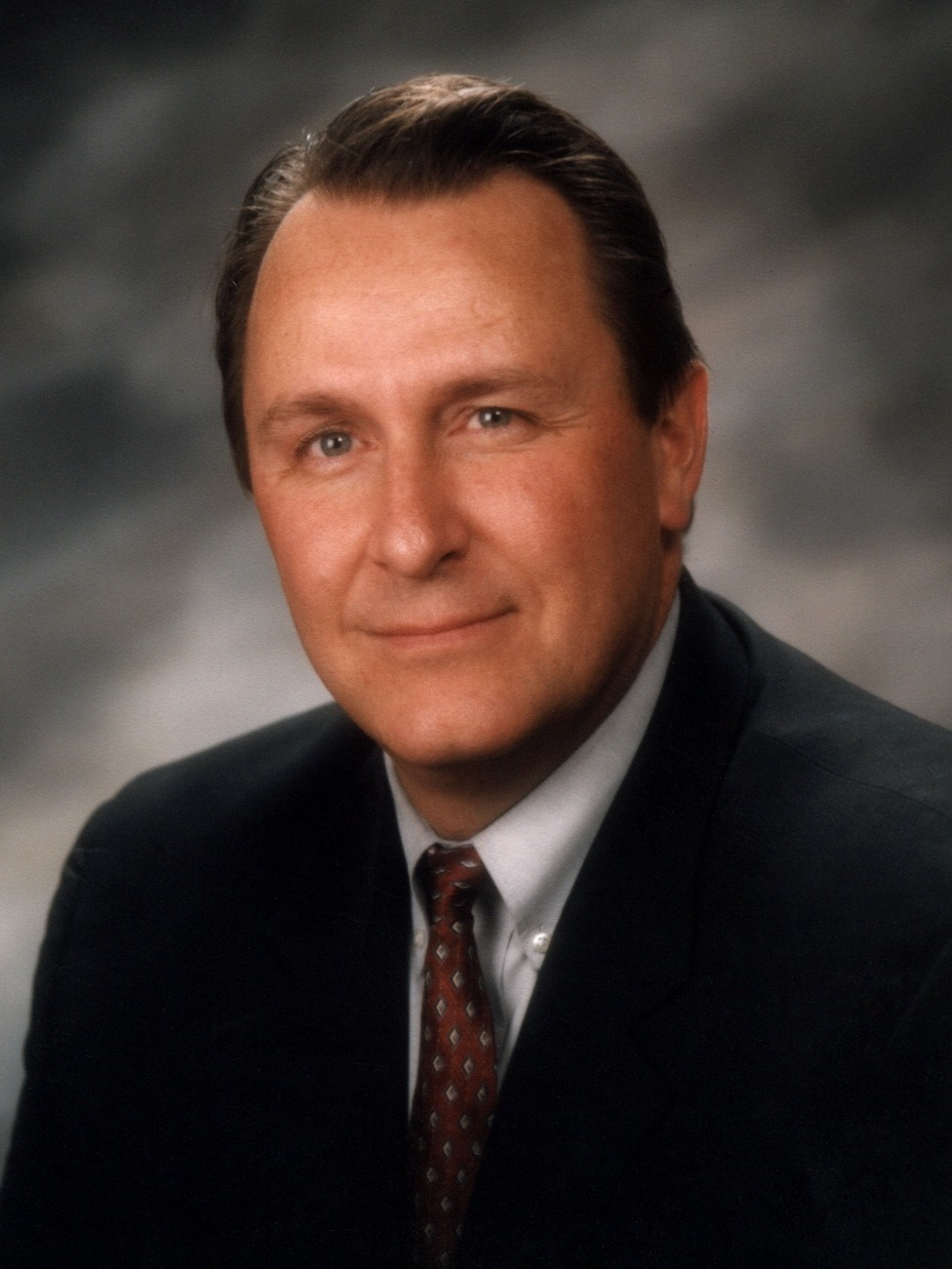
Mark Shurtleff

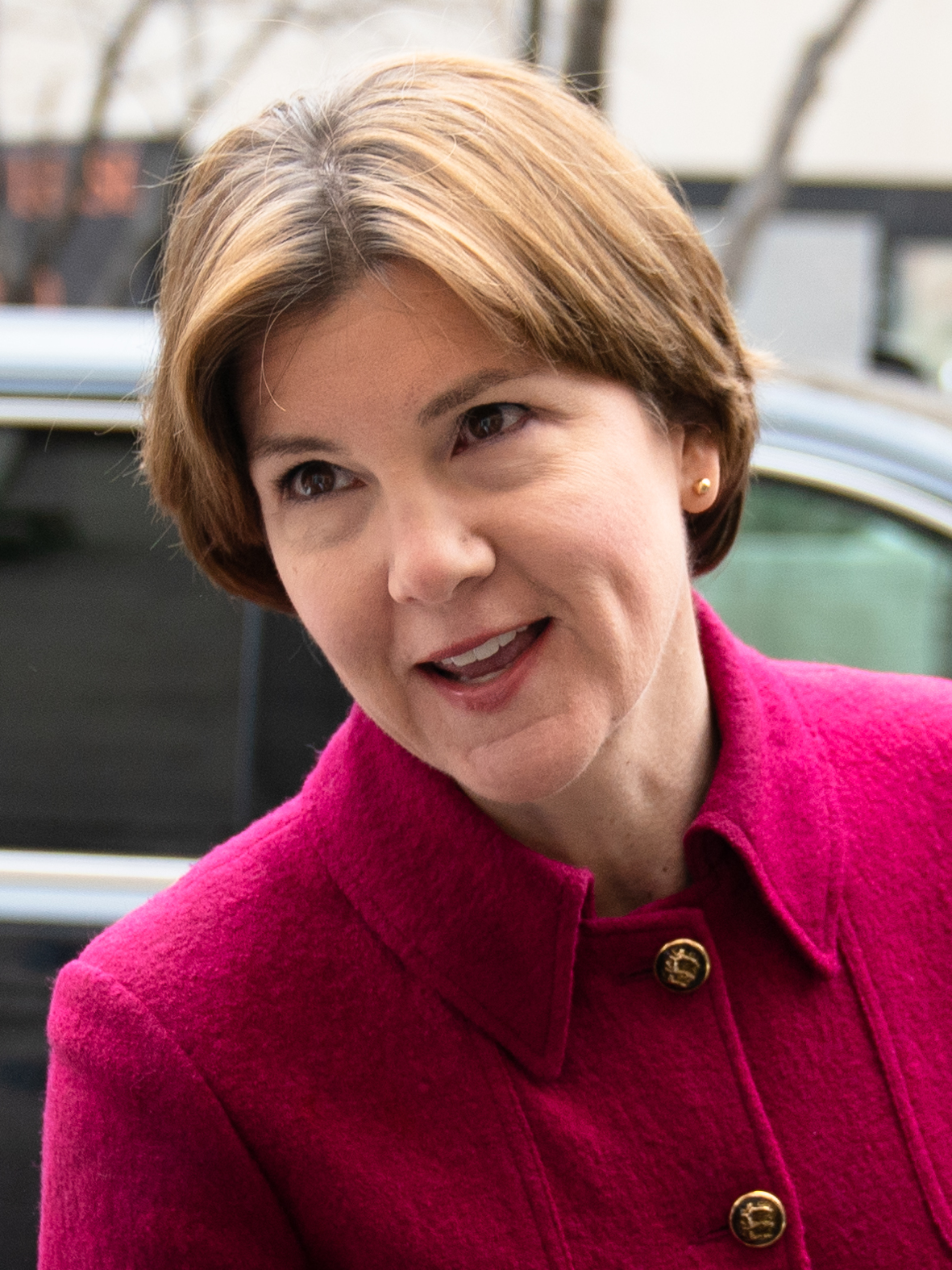
Lori Swanson

- Robert Abrams, attorney general of New York (1979–1993)
- Jeff Amestoy, chief justice of the Vermont Supreme Court (1997–2004), Attorney General of Vermont (1985–1997) (Republican)
- Doug Baily, Attorney General of Alaska (1989–1990) (Republican)
- Thurbert Baker, attorney general of Georgia (1997–2011)
- Rosalie Ballentine, attorney general of the United States Virgin Islands (1991–1995)
- Paul Bardacke, attorney general of New Mexico (1983–1986)
- Bruce Botelho, attorney general of Alaska (1994–2002), mayor of Juneau, AK (2003–2012, 1988–1991)
- Ethel Branch, attorney general of the Navajo Nation (2015–2019, 2023–present) (attorney general-equivalent)
- Margery Bronster, attorney general of Hawaii (1995–1999)
- Bob Butterworth, attorney general of Florida (1987–2002)
- Bonnie Campbell, Attorney General of Iowa (1991–1995)
- Pamela Carter, attorney general of Indiana (1993–1997)
- Steve Clark, attorney general of Arkansas (1979–1991)
- Martha Coakley, attorney general of Massachusetts (2007–2015)
- Mike Cody, attorney general of Tennessee (1984–1988)
- Walter Cohen, attorney general of Pennsylvania (1995) (Republican)
- Jack Conway, attorney general of Kentucky (2008–2016)
- Frederick Cooke, attorney general of the District of Columbia (1987–1990)
- Robert E. Cooper Jr., attorney general of Tennessee (2006–2014)
- J. Joseph Curran Jr., attorney general of Maryland (1987–2007), lieutenant governor of Maryland (1983–1987)
- Frankie Sue Del Papa, attorney general of Nevada (1991–2003), Secretary of State of Nevada (1987–1991)
- Michael Delaney, attorney general of New Hampshire (2009–2013)
- Matthew Denn, attorney general of Delaware (2015–2019), lieutenant governor of Delaware (2009–2015), Insurance Commissioner of Delaware (2005–2009)
- M. Jerome Diamond, attorney general of Vermont (1975–1981)
- Rufus Edmisten, attorney general of North Carolina (1974–1984), Secretary of State of North Carolina (1989–1996)
- Drew Edmondson, attorney general of Oklahoma (1995–2011)
- Joseph Foster, attorney general of New Hampshire (2013–2017)
- Karen Freeman-Wilson, attorney general of Indiana (2000–2001), mayor of Gary, IN (2012–2019)
- Steve Freudenthal, chair of the Wyoming Democratic Party (1999–2001), attorney general of Wyoming (1981–1983)
- Doug Gansler, attorney general of Maryland (2007–2015)
- Terry Goddard, attorney general of Arizona (2003–2011), mayor of Phoenix, AZ (1984–1990)
- Chris Gorman, attorney general of Kentucky (1992–1996)
- Jan Graham, attorney general of Utah (1993–2001)
- Scott Harshbarger, attorney general of Massachusetts (1991–1999)
- Neil Hartigan, attorney general of Illinois (1983–1991), lieutenant governor of Illinois (1973–1977)
- Peter C. Harvey, attorney general of New Jersey (2003–2006)
- Mike Hatch, attorney general of Minnesota (1999–2007)
- Jim Hood, attorney general of Mississippi (2004–2020)
- Skip Humphrey, attorney general of Minnesota (1983–1999)
- Richard Ieyoub, attorney general of Louisiana, (1992–2003)
- George Jepsen, attorney general of Connecticut (2011–2019)
- Jim Jones, chief justice (2015–2017) and justice (2015–2017) of the Idaho Supreme Court, attorney general of Idaho (1983–1991) (Republican)
- Drew Ketterer, attorney general of Maine (1995–2001)
- Peter Kilmartin, attorney general of Rhode Island (2011–2019)
- Gary King, attorney general of New Mexico (2007–2015)
- Oliver Koppell, attorney general of New York (1994)
- Jahna Lindemuth, attorney general of Alaska (2016–2018) (Independent)
- Bill Lockyer, treasurer of California (2007–2015), attorney general of California (1999–2007), president pro tempore of the California Senate (1994–1998)
- David M. Louie, attorney general of Hawaii (2011–2014)
- Lisa Madigan, attorney general of Illinois (2003–2019)
- Patricia A. Madrid, attorney general of New Mexico (1999–2007)
- Robert Marks, attorney general of Hawaii (1992–1995)
- Dustin McDaniel, attorney general of Arkansas (2007–2015)
- Frank Mendicino, attorney general of Wyoming (1975–1978)
- Anne Milgram, attorney general of New Jersey (2007–2010)
- Jeff Modisett, attorney general of Indiana (1997–2000)
- Mike Moore, attorney general of Mississippi (1988–2004)
- Irvin B. Nathan, attorney general of the District of Columbia (2011–2014), general counsel of the U.S. House of Representatives (2007–2011)
- Charles Oberly, U.S. Attorney for the District of Delaware (2010–2017), Attorney General of Delaware (1983–1995)
- Jeffrey B. Pine, attorney general of Rhode Island (1993–1999) (Republican)
- Edwin L. Pittman, chief justice (2001–2004) and justice (1989–2004) of the Supreme Court of Mississippi, attorney general of Mississippi (1984–1988)
- Warren Price, attorney general of Hawaii (1986–1992)
- Hector Reichard, secretary of justice of Puerto Rico (1981–1983)
- Thomas Reilly, attorney general of Massachusetts (1999–2007)
- Clarine Nardi Riddle, Secretary of Justice of Puerto Rico (1981–1983)
- Nancy H. Rogers, Attorney General of Ohio (2008–2009), dean of Moritz College of Law (2001–2006)
- Stephen Rosenthal, attorney general of Virginia (1993–1994)
- Luis Sánchez Betances, secretary of justice of Puerto Rico (2013)
- Mark Shurtleff, attorney general of Utah (2001–2013) (Republican)
- Steve Six, attorney general of Kansas (2008–2011)
- Gregory Smith, attorney general of New Hampshire (1980–1984) (Republican)
- James C. Smith, Secretary of State of Florida (2002–2003, 1987–1995), attorney general of Florida (1979–1987) (Republican)
- Bill Sorrell, attorney general of Vermont (1997–2017)
- Robert Spagnoletti, attorney general of the District of Columbia (2004–2006)
- Lori Swanson, attorney general of Minnesota (2007–2019)
- Mary Sue Terry, attorney general of Virginia (1986–1993)
- James Tierney, attorney general of Maine (1981–1991)
- Anthony Troy, attorney general of Virginia (1977–1978)
- Mike Turpen, attorney general of Oklahoma (1983–1987)
- John Knox Walkup, attorney general of Tennessee (1997–1999)
- Grant Woods, attorney general of Arizona (1991–1999) (Republican before 2018, Democratic 2018–present)
- James R. Zazzali, chief justice (2006–2007) and associate justice (2000–2006) of the New Jersey Supreme Court, attorney general of New Jersey (1981–1982)
- Greg Zoeller, attorney general of Indiana (2009–2017) (Republican)

=== Other executive elected officials ===
==== Current state ====
- Nikki Fried, Agriculture Commissioner of Florida (2019–2023)
- Nicole Galloway, 2020 nominee for governor of Missouri, State Auditor of Missouri (2015–2023)
- Sarah Godlewski, Treasurer of Wisconsin (2019–2023), Secretary of State of Wisconsin (2023–present)
- Richard Hodges, director of the Ohio Department of Health (2014–2017), Ohio House Representative (1993–1999) (Republican)
- Kathy Hoffman, Arizona Superintendent of Public Instruction (2019–2023)
- Sandra Kennedy, member of the Arizona Corporation Commission (2019–2023, 2009–2013), Arizona Senator (1993–2000), Arizona House Representative (1987–1992)
- Fiona Ma, Treasurer of California (2019–present), Speaker pro tempore of the California State Assembly (2010–2012)
- Susana Mendoza, Comptroller of Illinois (2016–present)
- Joe Torsella, treasurer of Pennsylvania (2017–2021), U.S. representative to the United Nations for Management and Reform (with the rank of ambassador) (2011–2014), chair and chief executive of the National Constitution Center (2006–2009, 1997–2003)
- Betty Yee, controller of California (2015–2023)

==== Tribal ====
- John Daniels Jr, treasurer of the Muckleshoot Indian Tribe
- Misty Napeahi, treasurer of the Tulalip
- Tommie Williamson, treasurer of the Match-e-be-nash-she-wish Band of Pottawatomi Indians of Michigan (2018–present)

==== Former ====
- Phil Angelides, California State Treasurer (1999–2007)
- Rebecca Holcombe, Vermont Secretary of Education (2014–2018)
- Lisa Graham Keegan, Arizona Superintendent of Public Instruction (1995–2001) (Republican)
- Andrew Sidamon-Eristoff, New Jersey State Treasurer (2010–2015) (Republican)
- Lynn Simons, Wyoming Superintendent of Public Instruction (1979–1991)
- Inez Tenenbaum, South Carolina Superintendent of Education (1999–2007)
- Steve Westly, California State Controller (2003–2007)

== State, territorial, and tribal judicial officials ==
=== Current ===
- Cheri Beasley, chief justice of the North Carolina Supreme Court (2019–2020), associate justice of the North Carolina Supreme Court (2012–2019)

=== Former ===
- Rebecca White Berch, chief justice of the Arizona Supreme Court (2009–2014) (Republican)
- John T. Broderick Jr., chief justice of the New Hampshire Supreme Court (1995–2004)
- Janine P. Geske, associate justice of the Wisconsin Supreme Court (1993–1998) (Republican)
- Robert C. Hunter, justice on the North Carolina Court of Appeals (1998–2014), North Carolina State Representative from District 49 (1980–1998)
- Stacy Leeds, justice of the Cherokee Nation Supreme Court, dean of the University of Arkansas School of Law (2011–2018)
- Greg Mathis, judge of the District Court of the State of Michigan (1995–1998)
- Robert F. Orr, justice of the North Carolina Supreme Court (1994–2004) (Republican)
- Leo E. Strine Jr., chief justice of the Delaware Supreme Court (2014–2019)
- Charles T. Wells, chief justice of the Supreme Court of Florida (2000–2002), member of the Supreme Court of Florida (1994–2009)

== Party officials ==
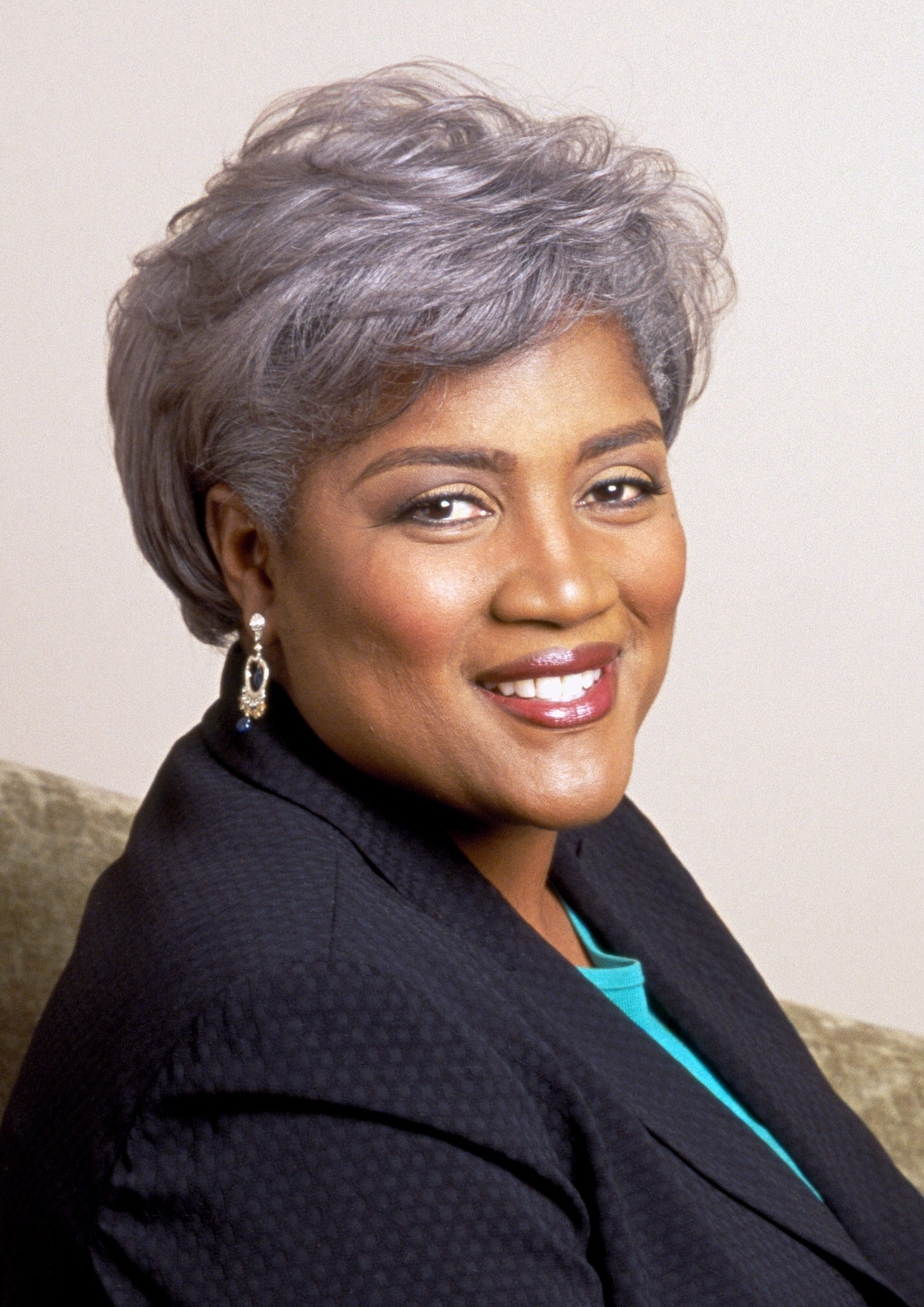
Donna Brazile

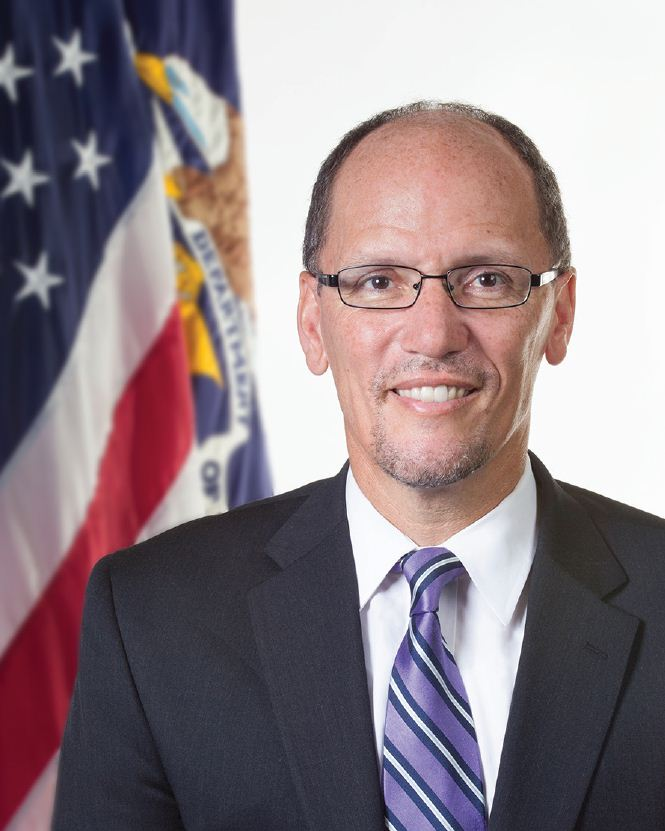
Tom Perez

=== Party chairs ===
- Donna Brazile, acting chair of the Democratic National Committee (2011, 2016–2017)
- Maurice Mitchell, national director of the Working Families Party (2018–present) (Working Families Party)
- Tom Perez, chair of the Democratic National Committee (2017–2021), U.S. Secretary of Labor (2013–2017), Assistant Attorney General for the Civil Rights Division (2013–2017)
- David Wilhelm, chair of the Democratic National Committee (1993–1994)
- Rosalind Wiener Wyman, chair of the 1984 Democratic National Convention, member of the Los Angeles City Council from District 5 (1953–1965)

=== Members of the DNC ===
==== Current ====
- Bob Mulholland, senior advisor for the California Democratic Party
- Henry R. Muñoz III, finance chair of the Democratic National Committee (2017–2019)
- Jason Rae, Secretary of the Democratic National Committee (2017–present)
- James Roosevelt, attorney, grandson of President Franklin D. Roosevelt, co-chair of the Rules and Bylaws Committee of the Democratic National Committee (1995–present)
- Symone Sanders, political commentator, national press secretary for the Bernie Sanders 2016 presidential campaign, senior advisor for the Joe Biden 2020 presidential campaign

==== Former ====
- Steve Kerrigan, CEO of the DNC (2009–2012)
- Hildy Kuryk, national finance director (2011–2013)
- Jane Watson Stetson, national finance chair (2009–2013)
- Andrew Tobias, treasurer of the DNC (1999–2017)

=== State and territory party chairs ===
==== Current ====
- Cecil Benjamin, chair of the Democratic Party of the Virgin Islands
- Nancy DiNardo, chair of the Connecticut Democratic Party (2005–2015, 2020–2025)
- Jane Kleeb, chair of the Nebraska Democratic Party (2016–present)
- Felecia Rotellini, chair of the Arizona Democratic Party (2018–2021)

==== Former ====
- Paul Berendt, chair of the Washington State Democratic Party (1995–2006)
- Matt Borges, chair of the Ohio Republican Party (2013–2017) (Republican)
- Pat Brady, chair of the Illinois Republican Party (2009–2013) (Republican)
- Chip Forrester, chair of the Tennessee Democratic Party (2009–2013)
- Jaime Harrison, 2020 nominee for Senate, chair of the South Carolina Democratic Party (2013–2017)
- Wayne Holland, chair of the Utah Democratic Party (2005–2011), president of United Steelworkers District 12 (2019–present)
- Jennifer Horn, chair of the New Hampshire Republican Party (2013–2017), co-founder of The Lincoln Project (Republican)
- Bob Tuke, chair of the Tennessee Democratic Party (2005–2007)
- David Young, chair of the North Carolina Democratic Party (2009–2011)

== Other 2020 candidates ==
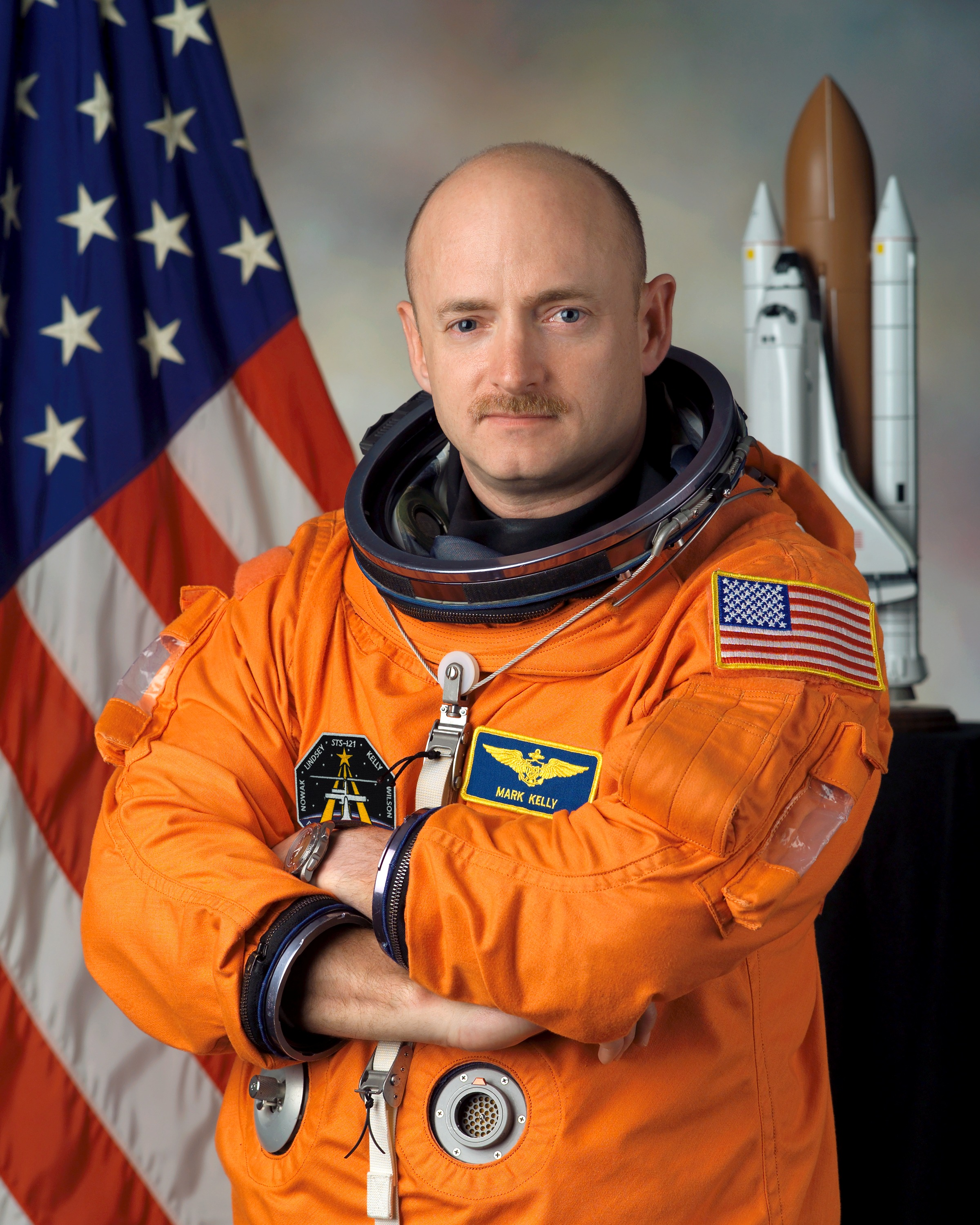
Mark Kelly

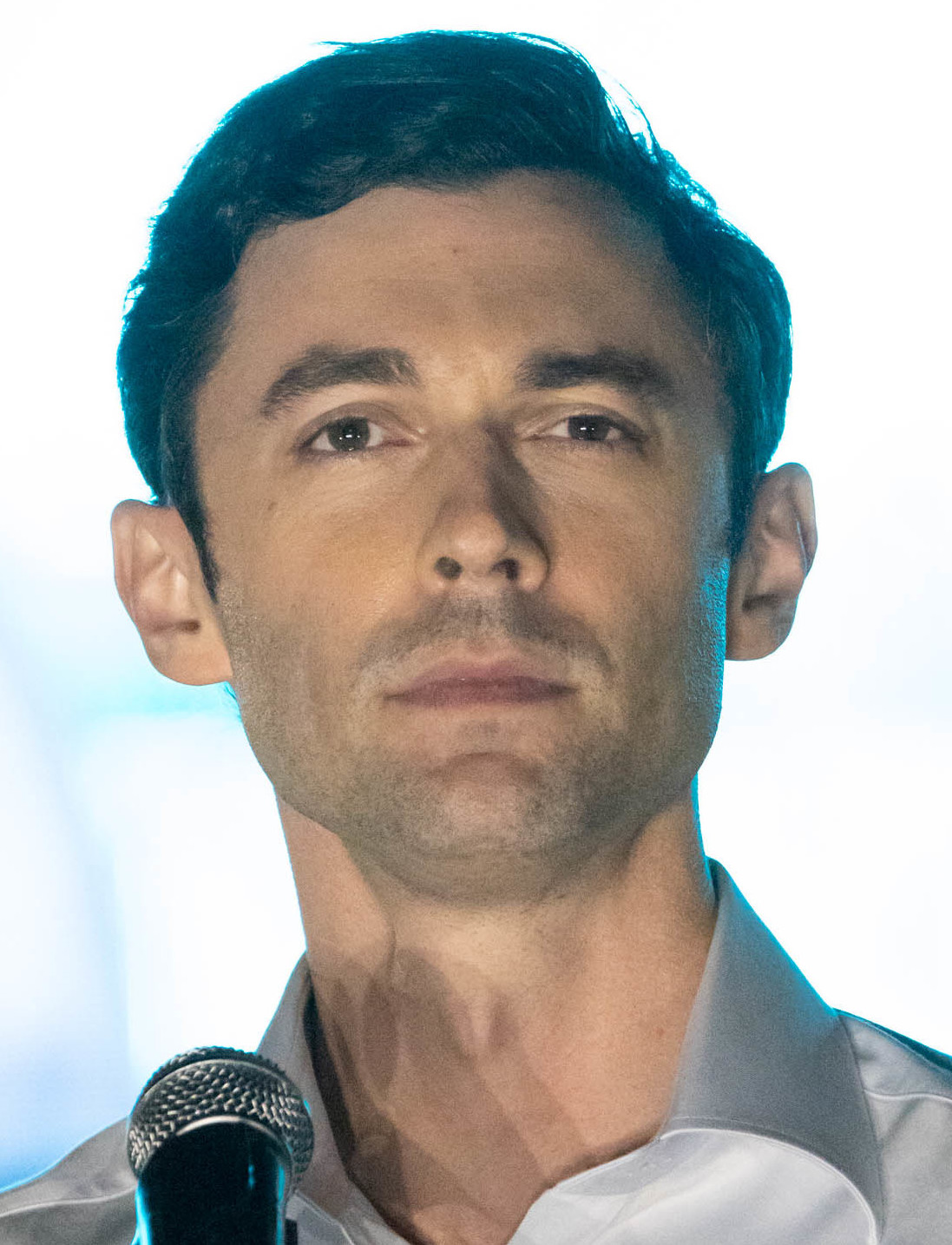
Jon Ossoff

- Jake Auchincloss, 2020 nominee for Massachusetts's 4th congressional district
- Jamaal Bowman, 2020 nominee for New York's 16th congressional district
- Nancy Goroff, 2020 nominee for New York's 1st congressional district, chair of the chemistry department at Stony Brook University
- Al Gross, Alaska 2020 nominee for Senate, orthopedic surgeon, former commercial fisherman
- MJ Hegar, 2020 Texas nominee for Senate
- Mondaire Jones, 2020 nominee for New York's 17th congressional district
- Mark Kelly, Arizona 2020 nominee for Senate, former astronaut
- Amy Kennedy, 2020 nominee for New Jersey's 2nd congressional district
- Sri Preston Kulkarni, 2020 nominee for Texas's 22nd congressional district
- Preston Love Jr., Nebraska 2020 write-in candidate for Senate
- Kathy Manning, 2020 nominee for North Carolina's 6th congressional district
- Amy McGrath, Kentucky 2020 nominee for Senate
- Woody Myers, 2020 nominee for governor of Indiana
- Marie Newman, 2020 nominee for Illinois' 3rd congressional district
- Christopher Peterson, 2020 nominee for governor of Utah, John J. Flynn Endowed Professor of Law at the University of Utah S.J. Quinney College of Law
- Nikil Saval, Pennsylvania 2020 candidate for State Senate
- Raphael Warnock, Georgia 2020 candidate for Senate, senior pastor of Ebenezer Baptist Church

== International officials ==
=== Heads of state and government ===
==== Current ====
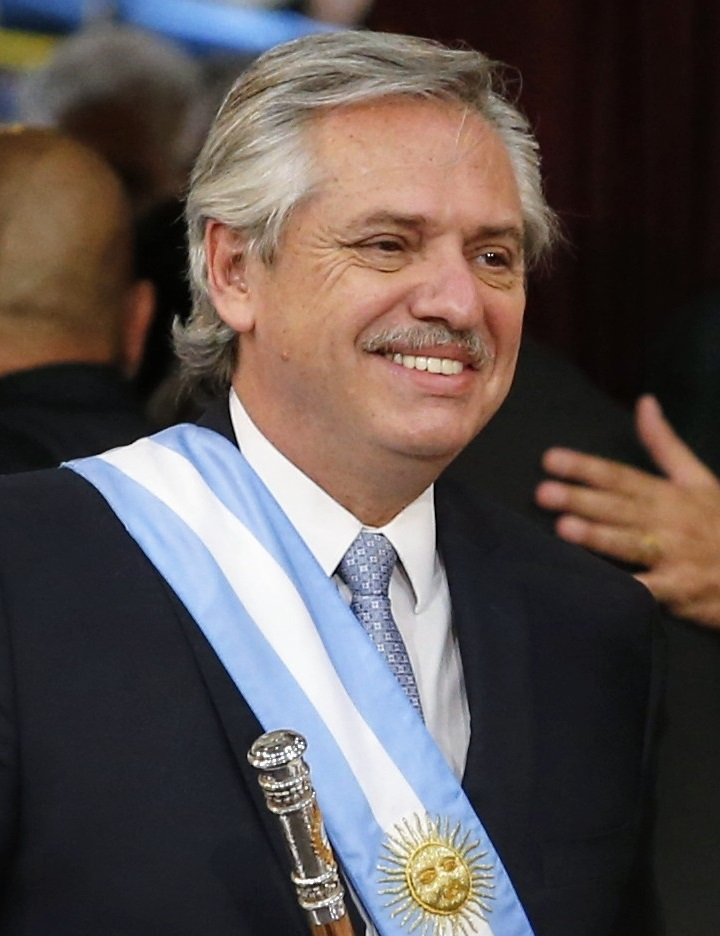
Alberto Fernandez

- Mahmoud Abbas, president of the State of Palestine (2005–present) (Fatah)
- Alberto Fernández, president of Argentina (2019–2023) (Justicialist Party)
- Zoran Milanović, president of Croatia (2020–present) (Independent)
- Mohammad Shtayyeh, prime minister of the State of Palestine (2019–2024) (Fatah)

==== Former ====
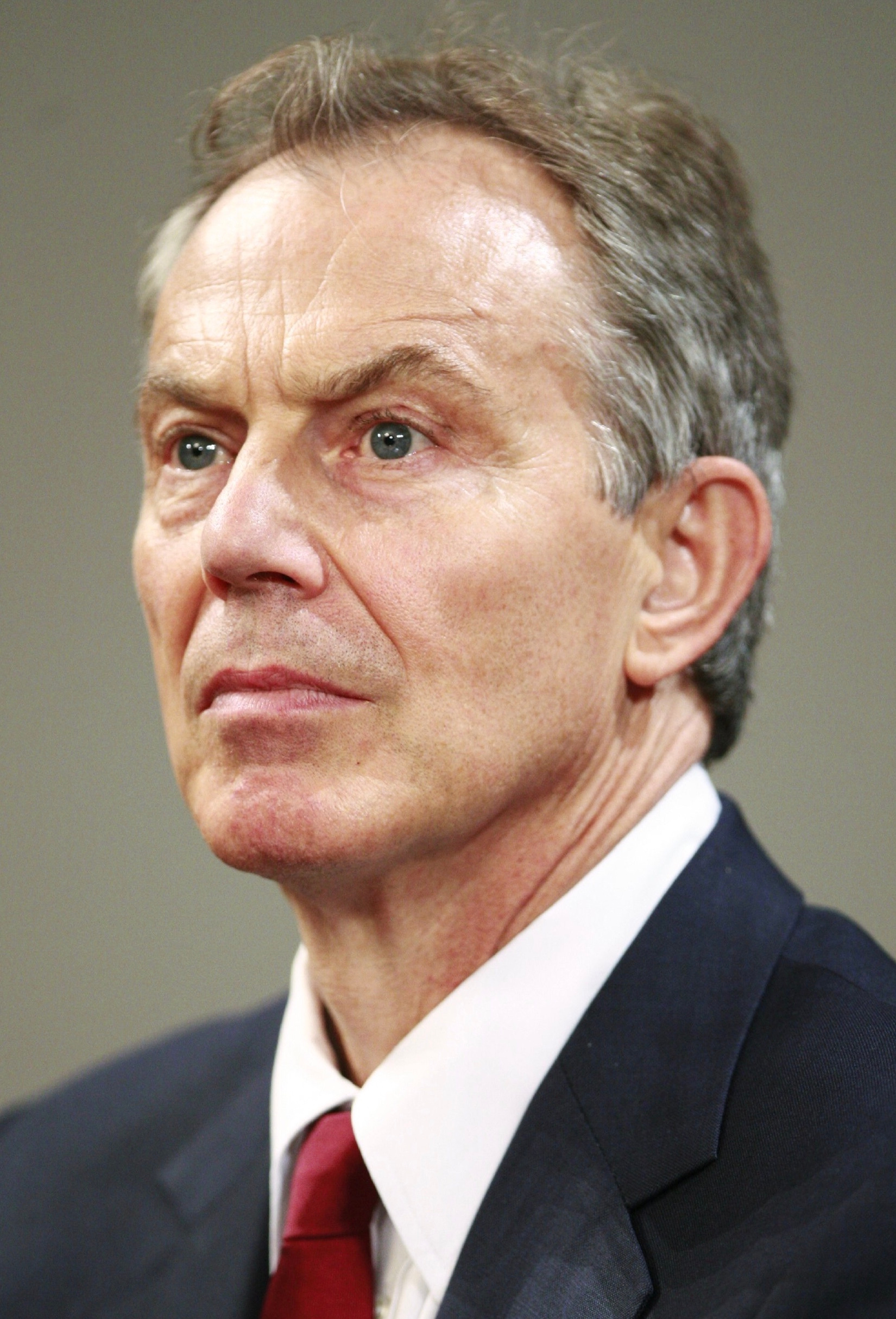
Tony Blair

David Cameron

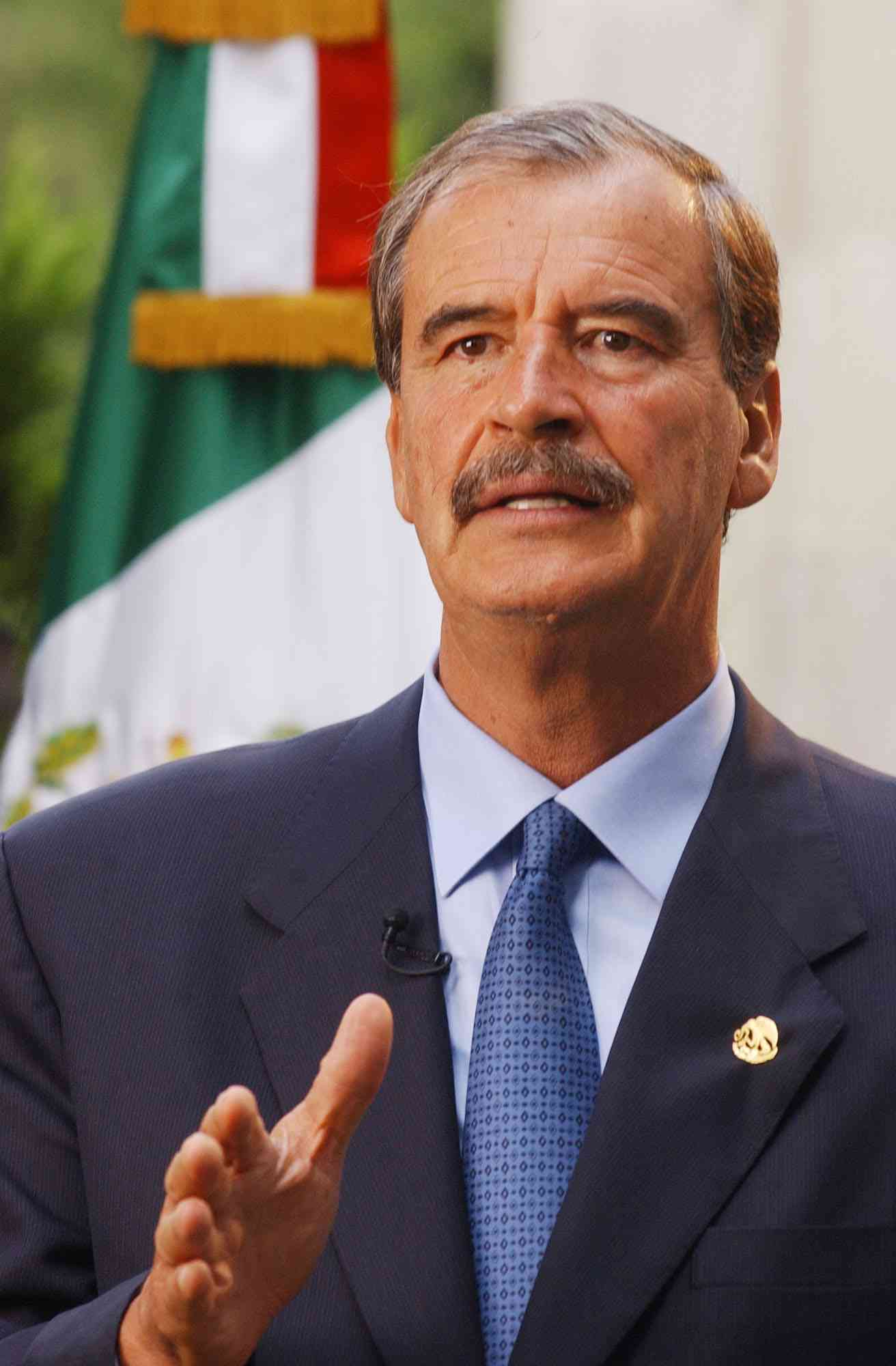
Vicente Fox

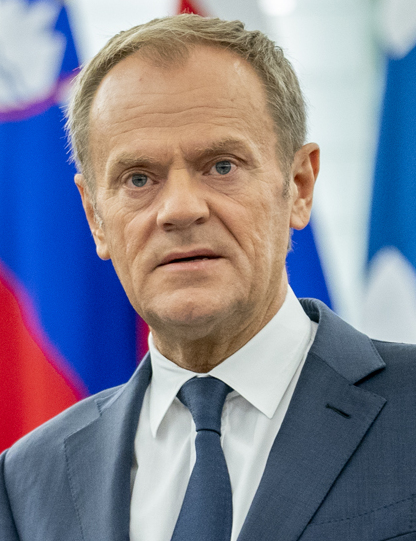
Donald Tusk

- Carl Bildt, prime minister of Sweden (1991–1994) (Moderate Party)
- Tony Blair, prime minister of the United Kingdom (1997–2007) (Labour Party)
- Jim Bolger, prime minister of New Zealand (1990–1997) (New Zealand National Party)
- Felipe Calderón, president of Mexico (2006–2012) (National Action Party)
- David Cameron, prime minister of the United Kingdom (2010–2016) (Conservative Party)
- Helen Clark, prime minister of New Zealand (1999–2008) (New Zealand Labour Party)
- Rafael Correa, president of Ecuador (2007–2017) (Citizen Revolution Movement)
- Mikuláš Dzurinda, prime minister of Slovakia (1998–2006), president of Slovakia (1998–1999) (Slovak Democratic and Christian Union – Democratic Party)
- Laurent Fabius, prime minister of France (1984–1986) (Socialist Party)
- José María Figueres, president of Costa Rica (1994–1998) (National Liberation Party)
- Anders Fogh Rasmussen, prime minister of Denmark (2001–2009), Secretary General of NATO (2009–2014) (Venstre)
- Vicente Fox, president of Mexico (2000–2006) (Independent)
- Julia Gillard, prime minister of Australia (2010–2013) (Labor Party)
- Ferenc Gyurcsány, prime minister of Hungary (2004–2009) (Democratic Coalition)
- Ellen Johnson Sirleaf, president of Liberia (2006–2018) (Independent)
- Albin Kurti, prime minister of Kosovo (2020) (Vetëvendosje)
- Henry McLeish, first minister of Scotland (2000–2001), leader of the Scottish Labour Party (2000–2001) (Scottish Labour)
- Mahathir Mohamad, prime minister of Malaysia (2018–2020, 1981–2003) (Homeland Fighters' Party)
- Evo Morales, president of Bolivia (2006–2019) (Movement for Socialism)
- Brian Mulroney, prime minister of Canada (1984–1993) (Conservative Party)
- P. J. Patterson, prime minister of Jamaica (1992–2006) (People's National Party)
- Petro Poroshenko, president of Ukraine (2014–2019) (European Solidarity)
- Fredrik Reinfeldt, prime minister of Sweden (2006–2014) (Moderate Party)
- Matteo Renzi, prime minister of Italy (2014–2016) (Italia Viva)
- Kevin Rudd, prime minister of Australia (2007–2010, 2013) (Labor Party)
- Malcolm Turnbull, prime minister of Australia (2015–2018) (Liberal Party)
- Donald Tusk, president of the European Council (2014–2019), Prime Minister of Poland (2007–2014 and 2023–present) (Civic Platform)
- Leo Varadkar, taoiseach of Ireland (2022–2024, 2017–2020) (Fine Gael)

=== Other executive officials ===
==== Current ====
- Jean Asselborn, Minister of Foreign Affairs of Luxembourg (2004–2023), Deputy Prime Minister of Luxembourg (2004–2013)
- Francesco Boccia, Italian Minister of Regional Affairs and Autonomies (2019–2021), member of the Italian Chamber of Deputies (2008–2022) (Democratic Party)
- Hilde Crevits, Vice Minister-President and Minister for Economy, Innovation, Work, Social economy and Agriculture of the Flemish Government (2019–present), Vice Minister-President and Minister of Education of the Flemish Government (2014–2019) (Christen-Democratisch en Vlaams)
- Jan Hamáček, First Deputy Prime Minister of the Czech Republic (2018–2021) (Czech Social Democratic Party)
- Kamina Johnson-Smith, Ministry of Foreign Affairs and Foreign Trade of Jamaica (2016–present) (Labour Party)
- Meryame Kitir, Minister of Development Cooperation and Urban Policy of Belgium (2020–2022) (Socialistische Partij Anders)
- Sammy Mahdi, Secretary of State for Asylum and Migration of Belgium (2020–2022) (Christen-Democratisch en Vlaams)
- Vincent Van Quickenborne, Minister of Justice and the North Sea of Belgium (2020–2023) (Open Vlaamse Liberalen en Democraten)
- Olaf Scholz, Federal Minister of Finance and Vice-Chancellor of Germany (2018–2021), Chancellor of Germany (2021–2025)(Social Democratic Party of Germany)
- Petra De Sutter, Minister of Civil Service of Belgium (2020–present) (Groen)

==== Former ====
- Simon Burns, Minister of State for Transport of the United Kingdom (2012–2013) (Conservative Party)
- Alan Duncan, Minister of State for International Development of the United Kingdom (2010–2014) (Conservative Party)
- Sigmar Gabriel, Vice-Chancellor of Germany (2013–2018) (Social Democratic Party of Germany)
- William Hague, First Secretary of State of the United Kingdom (2010–2015), Leader of the House of Commons (2014–2015), Leader of the Conservative Party (1997–2001) (Conservative Party)
- Sajid Javid, Secretary of State for Housing, Communities and Local Government of the United Kingdom (2016–2018), Home Secretary (2018–2019), Chancellor of the Exchequer (2019–2020) (Conservative Party)
- Marina Kaljurand, Minister of Foreign Affairs for Estonia (2015–2016) (Social Democratic Party)
- Luis Gilberto Murillo, Ministry of Environment and Sustainable Development of Colombia (2016–2018) (Radical Change)
- Ana Palacio, Minister of Foreign Affairs of Spain (2002–2004) (People's Party)
- Christopher Pyne, Minister for Defence of Australia (2018–2019) (Liberal Party)
- Fahrudin Radončić, Minister of Security of Bosnia and Herzegovina (2012–2014, 2019–2020) (Union for a Better Future of BiH)

=== Legislative officials ===
==== Current ====
- Markéta Adamová, party leader of TOP 09 (2019–2025), member of the Chamber of Deputies of the Czech Republic (2013–2025) (TOP 09)
- Meyrem Almaci, party president of Groen (2014–2022), member of the Flemish Parliament (2019–present), member of the Belgian Chamber of Representatives (2007–2019) (Groen)
- Anna Ascani, member of the Italian Chamber of Deputies (2013–present) (Democratic Party)
- Ivan Bartoš, member of the Chamber of Deputies of the Czech Republic (2017–present), leader of the Czech Pirate Party (2009–2013, 2013–2014, 2016–2024) (Czech Pirate Party)
- Alfredo Bazoli, member of the Italian Chamber of Deputies (2013–2022), member of the Italian Senate (2022–present) (Democratic Party)
- Caterina Biti, member of the Italian Senate (2018–2022) (Democratic Party)
- Georges-Louis Bouchez, president of the Mouvement Réformateur (2019–present), member of the Belgian Senate (2019–present) (Mouvement Réformateur)
- Nooshi Dadgostar, Leader of the Left Party (2019–present), member of the Riksdag from Stockholm County (2014–present) (Left Party)
- Ed Davey, Leader of the Liberal Democrats (2020–present), Member of Parliament of the United Kingdom for Kingston and Surbiton (1997–2015, 2017–present) (Liberal Democrats)
- Pia Olsen Dyhr, Leader of the Socialist People's Party (2004–present), member of the Danish Folketing (2006, 2007–present) (Socialist People's Party)
- Jakob Ellemann-Jensen, leader of Venstre (2019–2023), member of the Danish Folketing (2011–2023) (Venstre)
- Davide Faraone, member of the Italian Senate (2019–present) (Italia Viva)
- Stephen Farry, Member of Parliament of the United Kingdom for North Down (2019–2024) (Alliance Party of Northern Ireland)
- Valeria Fedeli, member of the Italian Senate (2013–2022) (Democratic Party)
- Maximiliano Ferraro, National Deputy for the City of Buenos Aires (2019–present), president of the Civic Coalition ARI (2018–present) (Civic Coalition ARI)
- Emanuele Fiano, member of the Italian Chamber of deputies (2006–2022) (Democratic Party)
- Dagmar Freitag, member of the German Bundestag (1994–2021) (Social Democratic Party of Germany)
- Peđa Grbin, president of the Social Democratic Party of Croatia (2020–2024), member of the Croatian Parliament (2011–2025) (Social Democratic Party of Croatia)
- Gregor Gysi, member of the German Bundestag for Berlin-Treptow-Köpenick (2005–present, 1990–2002) (The Left)
- Marian Jurečka, Leader of KDU-ČSL (2020–2024), member of the Chamber of deputies of the Czech Republic (2013–present) (KDU-ČSL)
- Neil Kinnock, member of the House of Lords of the United Kingdom (2005–present), Leader of the Labour Party (1983–1992), Member of Parliament of the United Kingdom for Islwyn (1983–1995), MP for Bedwellty (1970–1983) (Labour Party)
- Ulf Kristersson, Leader of the Opposition (2017–2022), Leader of the Moderate Party (2017–present), member of the Riksdag (1994–2000, 2014–present) (Moderate Party)
- Egbert Lachaert, member of the Belgian Chamber of Representatives (2014–present) (Open Vlaamse Liberalen en Democraten)
- Alexander Graf Lambsdorff, member of the German Bundestag for North Rhine-Westphalia (2017–2023) (Free Democratic Party)
- Facundo Suárez Lastra, National Deputy of Argentina (2017–2021) (Radical Civic Union)
- Stefan Liebich, member of the German Bundestag for Berlin (2009–2021) (The Left)
- Annie Lööf, Leader of the Centre Party (2011–2023), member of the Riksdag (2006–2023) (Centre Party)
- Luca Lotti, member of the Italian Chamber of Deputies (2013–present) (Democratic Party)
- Andrea Marcucci, member of the Italian Senate (2008–2022) (Democratic Party)
- Salvatore Margiotta, member of the Italian Senate (2013–2021) (Democratic Party)
- Maurizio Martina, member of the Italian Chamber of deputies for Lombardy (2018–2021) (Democratic Party)
- John McGahon, Seanad Éireann (2020–2025) (Fine Gael)
- Erin McGreehan, Seanad Éireann (2020–2024) (Fianna Fáil)
- Katherine Miranda, member of the Chamber of Representatives of Colombia (2018–present) (Green Alliance)
- Alessia Morani, member of the Italian Chamber of Deputies (2013–2022) (Democratic Party)
- Omid Nouripour, member of the German Bundestag for Hesse (2006–2021), member of the German Bundestag for Frankfurt am Main II (2021–present) (Alliance 90/The Greens)
- Dario Parrini, member of the Italian Senate (2018–present) (Democratic Party)
- Adam Price, Leader of Plaid Cymru (2018–2023), Member of the Senedd (2016–present) and MP (2001–2010) for Carmarthen East and Dinefwr (Plaid Cymru)
- Lia Quartapelle, member of the Italian Chamber of Deputies (2013–present) (Democratic Party)
- Vít Rakušan, member of the Chamber of Deputies of the Czech Republic (2017–present) (Mayors and Independents)
- Neale Richmond, member of the Teachta Dála of Ireland (2020–present) (Fine Gael)
- Gabriela Rivadeneira, member of the Ecuadorian National Assembly for the National Constituency (2013–2021) (Citizen Revolution Movement)
- Randolfe Rodrigues, Brazilian Senator for Amapá (2011–present) (Sustainability Network)
- Ettore Rosato, member of the Italian Chamber of Deputies (2008–present, 2003–2006) (Italia Viva)
- Norbert Röttgen, member of the Bundestag for Rhein-Sieg-Kreis II of Germany (1994–present) (Christian Democratic Union)
- Jagmeet Singh, member of the Canadian Parliament for Burnaby South (2019–2025), leader of the New Democratic Party (2017–2025) (New Democratic Party
- Pernille Skipper, member of the Danish Folketing (2011–2021) (Red–Green Alliance)
- Jonas Gahr Støre, Leader of the Opposition (2014–2021), Leader of the Labour Party (2014–present), Member of the Norwegian Parliament (2009–present) (Labour Party)
- Gabriele Toccafondi, member of the Italian Chamber of Deputies (2018–2022, 2008–2013) (Italia Viva)
- Erkki Tuomioja, member of the Parliament of Finland (1970–1979, 1991–present) (Social Democratic Party of Finland)
- Walter Verini, member of the Italian Chamber of Deputies (2008–2022), member of the Italian Senate (2022–present) (Democratic Party)
- Louisa Wall, member of the New Zealand Parliament, (2008, 2011, 2020–2022) (New Zealand Labour Party)

==== Former ====
- Ricardo Anaya, president of the Mexican Chamber of Deputies (2013–2014), 2018 nominee for president (National Action Party)
- Elisa Carrió, National Deputy for the City of Buenos Aires (2005–2007, 2009–2019) (Civic Coalition ARI)
- Josephine Fock, member of the Danish Folketing (2015–2018) (The Alternative)
- Antonello Giacomelli, member of the Italian Chamber of Deputies (2004–2020) (Democratic Party)
- Neil Kinnock, Leader of the Opposition in parliament (1983–1992) (Labour Party)
- Boris Miletić, member of the Croatian Parliament (2008–2011, 2015–2018) (Istrian Democratic Assembly)
- Leopoldo Martínez Nucete, deputy of the National Assembly of Venezuela (2000–2005)
- Struan Stevenson, member of the European Parliament for Scotland (1999–2014) (Scottish Conservative)
- Anne Tolley, deputy Speaker of the New Zealand House of Representatives (2017–2020) (New Zealand National Party)

== Academics and scholars ==
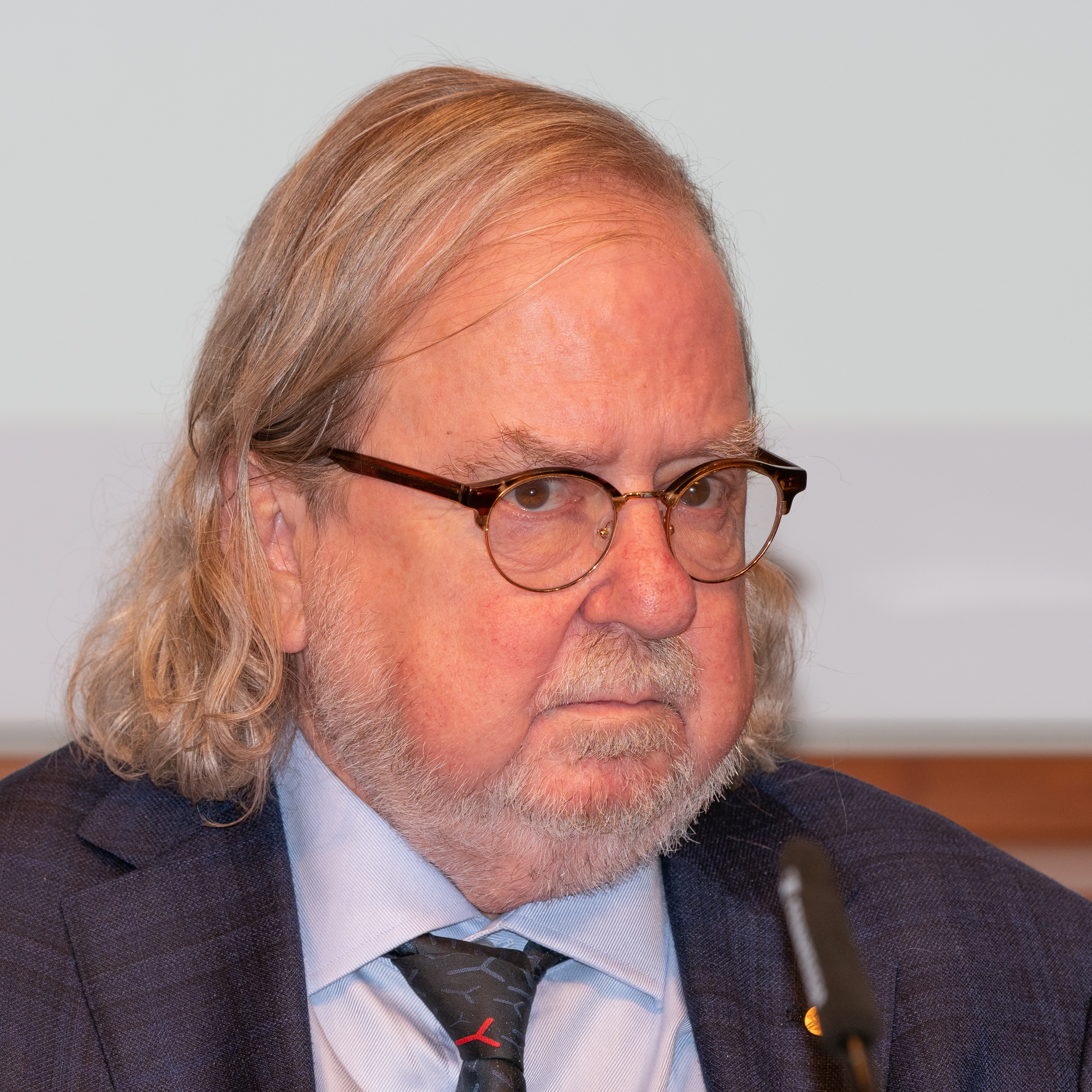
James P. Allison

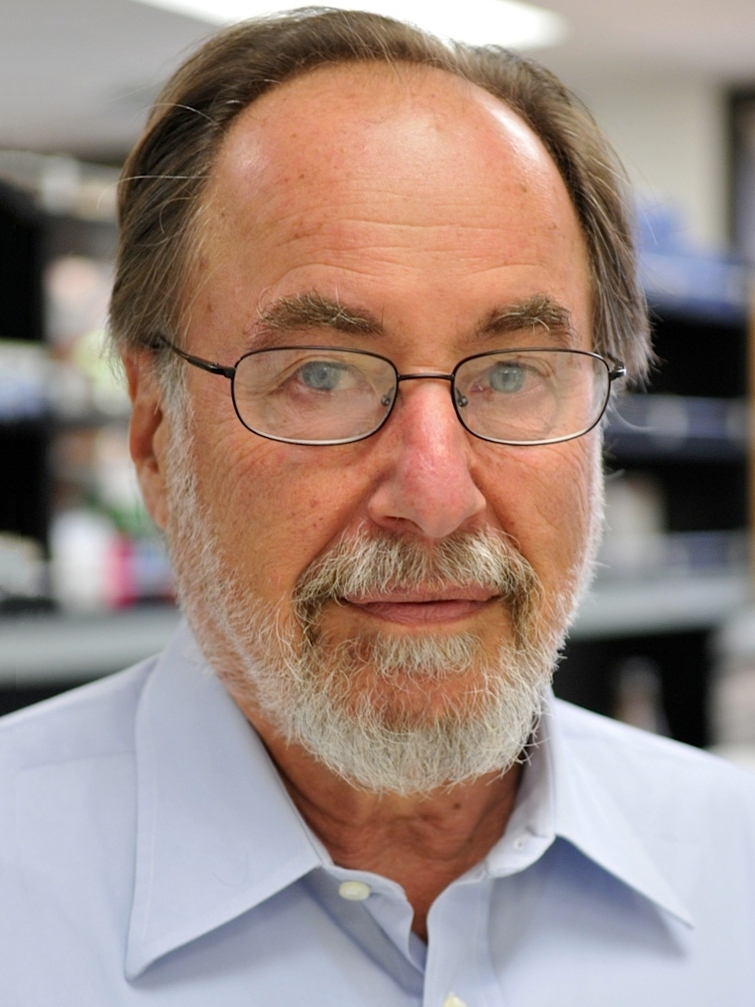
David Baltimore

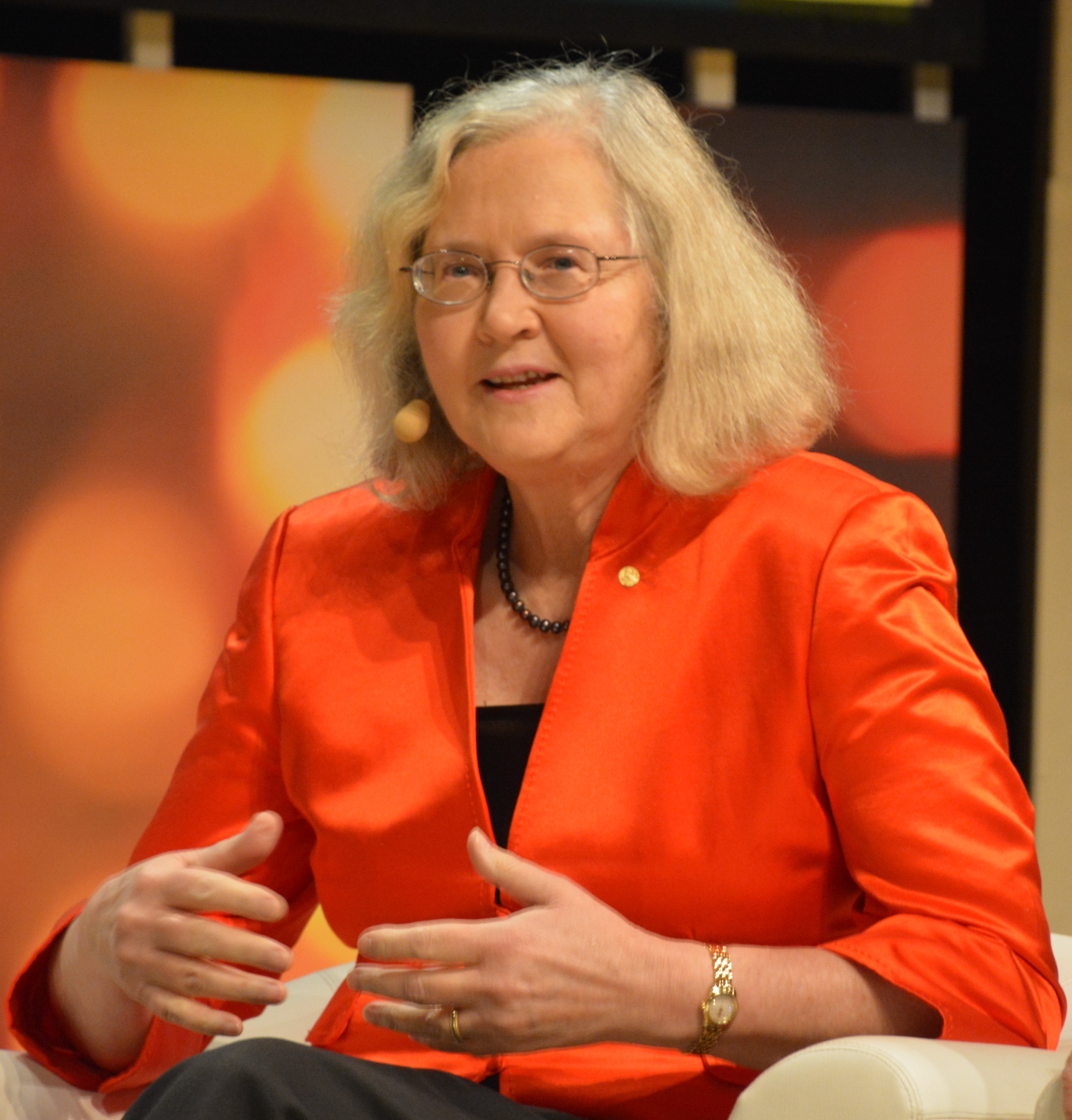
Elizabeth Blackburn

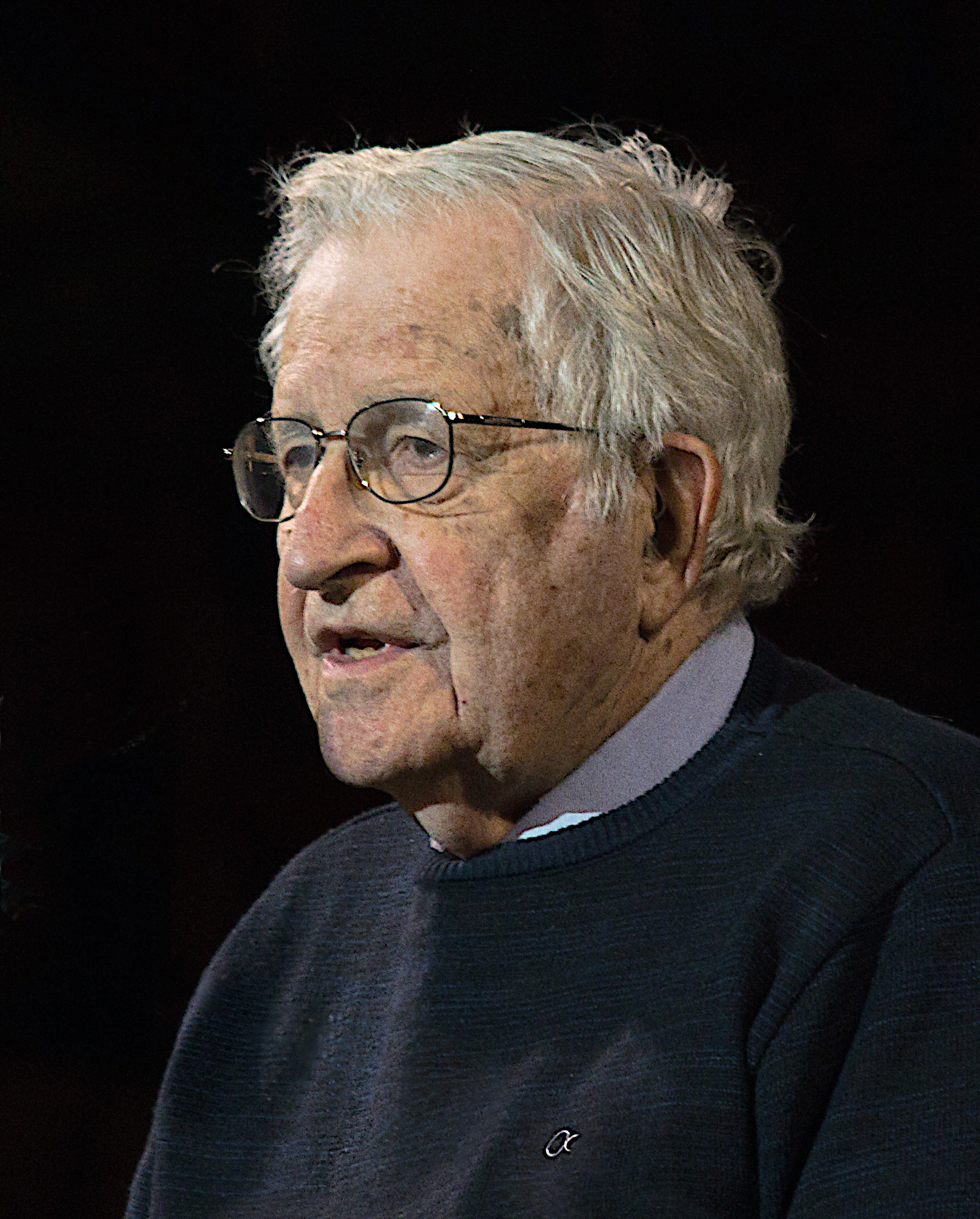
Noam Chomsky

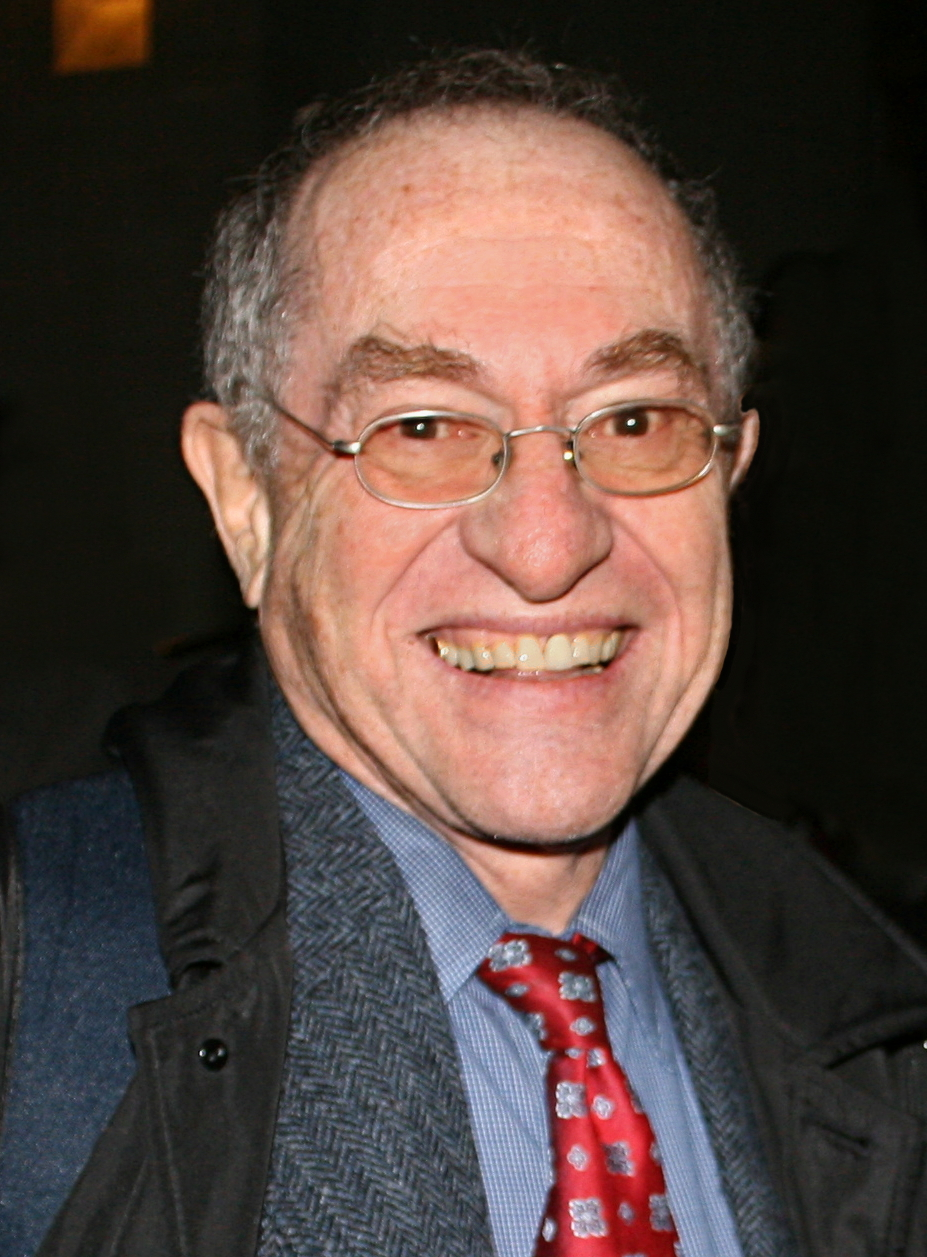
Alan Dershowitz

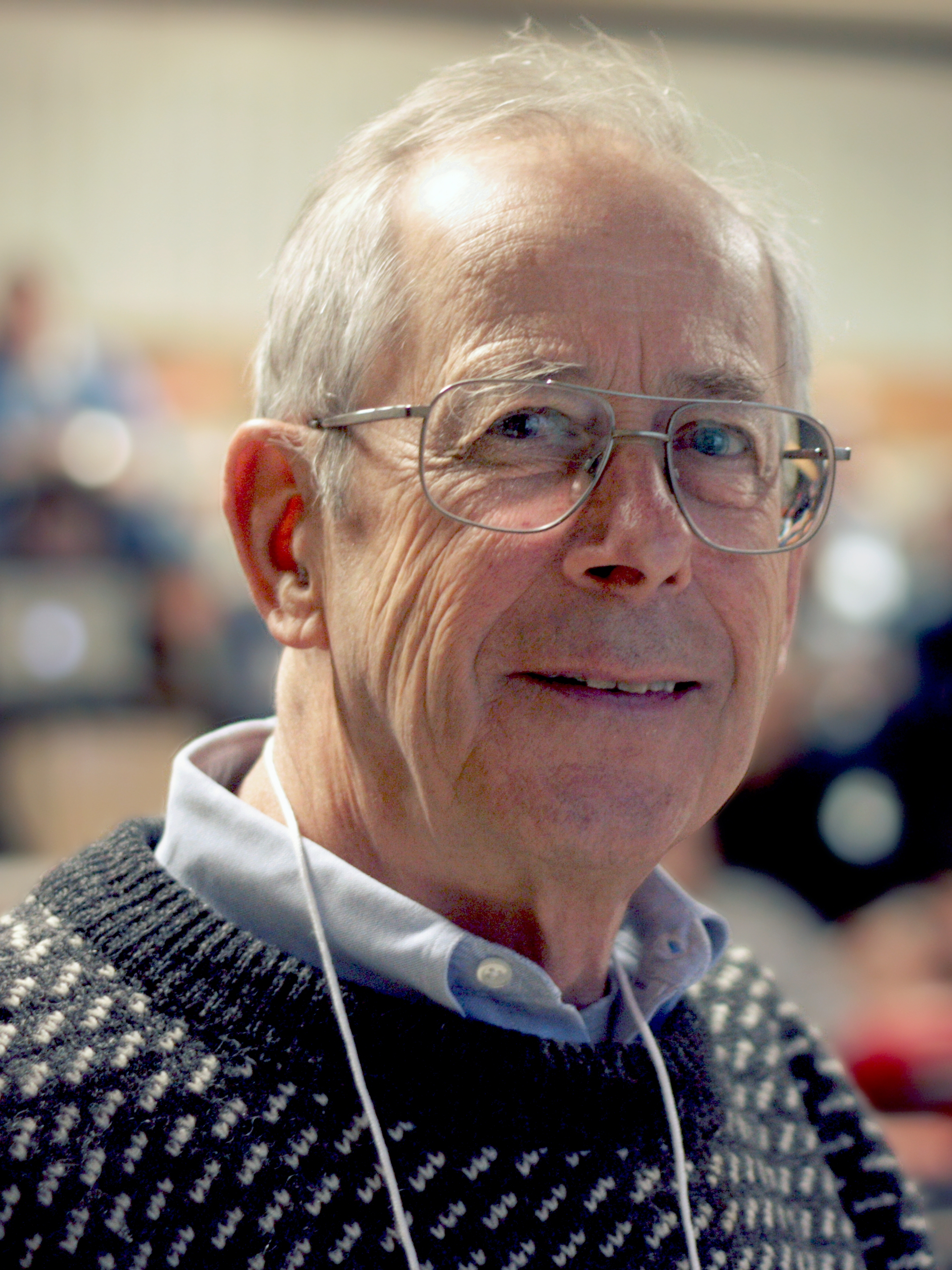
Jim Peebles

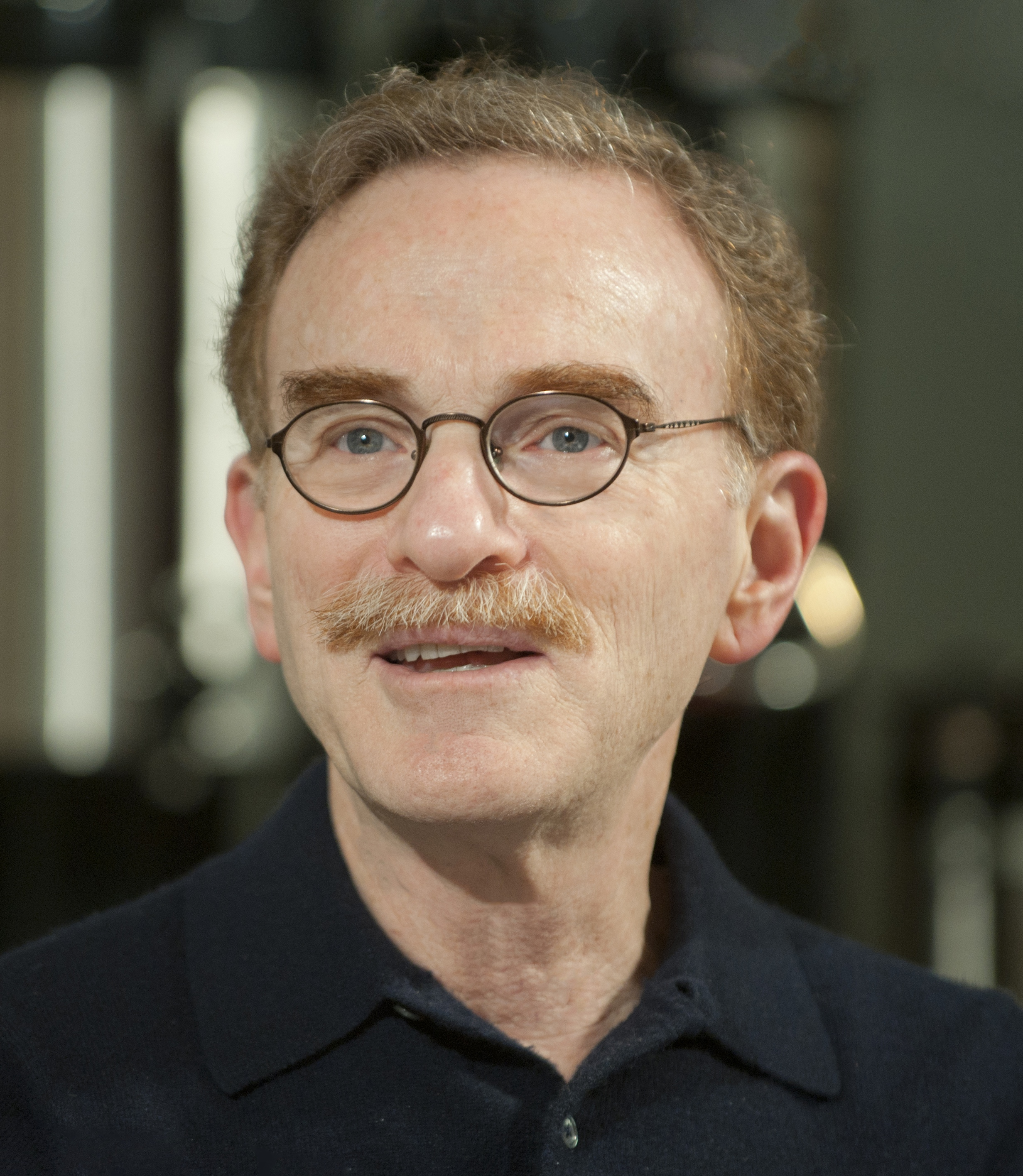
Randy Schekman

- Andreas Acrivos, Albert Einstein Professor Emeritus of Science and Engineering at City College of New York
- Peter Agre, physician, molecular biologist, Bloomberg Distinguished Professor at the Johns Hopkins Bloomberg School of Public Health and Johns Hopkins School of Medicine and recipient of the Nobel Prize in Chemistry in 2003
- George Akerlof, economist, professor at the McCourt School of Public Policy at Georgetown University, professor of Economics Emeritus at the University of California, Berkeley and 2001 recipient of the Nobel Memorial Prize in Economics
- Bruce Alberts, Chancellor's Leadership Chair in Biochemistry and Biophysics for Science and Education at the University of California, San Francisco, president of the National Academy of Sciences (1993–2005)
- Parney Albright, physicist, weapons scientist and former director of the Lawrence Livermore National Laboratory
- James P. Allison, immunologist, professor and chair of immunology and executive director of immunotherapy platform at the MD Anderson Cancer Center at the University of Texas and recipient of the Nobel Prize in Physiology or Medicine in 2018
- Gar Alperovitz, historian, political economist, Lionel R. Bauman Professor of Political Economy at the University of Maryland, College Park
- Sidney Altman, molecular biologist, Sterling Professor of Molecular, Cellular, and Developmental Biology and Chemistry at Yale University and recipient of the Nobel Prize in Chemistry in 1989
- Bernard Amadei, professor of civil engineering at the University of Colorado Boulder, founder of Engineers without Borders USA
- Frances Arnold, chemical engineer, Linus Pauling Professor of Chemical Engineering, Bioengineering and Biochemistry at California Institute of Technology and recipient of the Nobel Prize in Chemistry in 2018
- Reza Aslan, Iranian-American scholar of religious studies, writer, television host
- Myron Augsburger, theologian, former president of Eastern Mennonite University and the Council for Christian Colleges and Universities, pastor
- Richard Axel, molecular biologist, professor in the Department of Neuroscience at Columbia University and recipient of the Nobel Prize in Physiology or Medicine in 2004
- David Baltimore, biologist, professor of Biology and former president at California Institute of Technology and recipient of the Nobel Prize in Physiology or Medicine in 1975
- Barry Barish, experimental physicist, professor of physics, emeritus, at the California Institute of Technology and recipient of the Nobel Prize in Physics in 2017
- Paul Berg, biochemist and professor emeritus at Stanford University, recipient of the Nobel Prize in Chemistry in 1980
- Joshua Berman, professor of Bible at Bar-Ilan University
- J. Michael Bishop, immunologist, microbiologist, former chancellor of University of California, San Francisco and recipient of the Nobel Prize in Physiology or Medicine in 1989
- Rachel Bitecofer, author, assistant director of the Wason Center for Public Policy at Christopher Newport University and senior fellow at the Niskanen Center
- Elizabeth Blackburn, biologist, former president of the Salk Institute for Biological Studies and recipient of the Nobel Prize in Physiology or Medicine in 2009
- Manuel Blum, former professor of computer science at University of California, Berkeley and Carnegie Mellon University
- Philip Bobbitt, Herbert Wechsler Professor of Jurisprudence at Columbia Law School
- Michael Stuart Brown, geneticist and recipient of the Nobel Prize in Physiology or Medicine in 1985
- Linda B. Buck, biologist at Fred Hutchinson Cancer Research Center and recipient of the Nobel Prize in Physiology or Medicine in 2004
- Diana Butler Bass, historian of Christianity, independent scholar, advocate for Progressive Christianity
- Daniel Byman, Senior Associate Dean at the Georgetown University Walsh School of Foreign Service
- Mario Capecchi, geneticist, distinguished professor of Human Genetics and Biology at the University of Utah School of Medicine and recipient of the Nobel Prize in Physiology or Medicine in 2007
- Thomas Cech, chemist and recipient of the Nobel Prize in Chemistry in 1989
- Vint Cerf, internet pioneer, former assistant professor at Stanford University
- Martin Chalfie, neurobiologist, professor at Columbia University and recipient of the Nobel Prize in Chemistry in 2008
- Aviva Chomsky, historian, professor of history and the coordinator of Latin American, Latino and Caribbean Studies at Salem State University
- Noam Chomsky, linguist, Institute Professor Emeritus at the Massachusetts Institute of Technology
- Kim Cobb, professor in the School of Earth and Atmospheric Sciences at the Georgia Institute of Technology
- Marjorie Cohn, professor of law at the Thomas Jefferson School of Law, former president of the National Lawyers Guild
- Elias James Corey, organic chemist and recipient of the Nobel Prize in Chemistry in 1990
- Yi Cui, professor of materials science and engineering at Stanford University
- John Dabiri, Centennial Chair Professor of Fluid Dynamics at the California Institute of Technology
- Gretchen Daily, Bing Professor of Environmental Science at Stanford University
- Ruth DeFries, environmental geographer and professor at Columbia University
- Alan Dershowitz, lawyer and former Felix Frankfurter Professor of Law at Harvard Law School
- Peter Diamond, economist, Institute Professor at the Massachusetts Institute of Technology, winner of the Nobel Memorial Prize in Economic Sciences in 2010
- Whitfield Diffie, consulting scholar at Stanford University
- Anne H. Ehrlich, associate director of the Center for Conservation Biology at Stanford University
- Paul R. Ehrlich, Bing Professor of Population Studies at Stanford University
- Ezekiel Emanuel, oncologist, bioethicist, senior fellow at the Center for American Progress and vice provost for global initiatives at the University of Pennsylvania
- Ann Ferguson, philosopher, Professor Emerita of Philosophy and Women's Studies at the University of Massachusetts Amherst
- Edmond H. Fischer, biochemist, recipient of the Nobel Prize in Physiology or Medicine in 1992
- Joachim Frank, biophysicist at Columbia University and recipient of the Nobel Prize in Chemistry in 2017
- Linda P. Fried, dean of the Columbia University Mailman School of Public Health (2008–present)
- Jerome Isaac Friedman, physicist, professor of physics, emeritus, at the Massachusetts Institute of Technology and recipient of the Nobel Prize in Physics in 1990
- Walter Gilbert, biochemist, physicist, molecular biology pioneer and recipient of the Nobel Prize in Chemistry in 1980
- Sheldon Glashow, theoretical physicist, Eugene Higgins Professor of Physics, Emeritus, at Harvard University and recipient of the Nobel Prize in Physics in 1979
- Joseph L. Goldstein, biochemist and recipient of the Nobel Prize in Physiology or Medicine in 1985
- Shafi Goldwasser, director of the Simons Institute for the Theory of Computing, former mathematical science professor at Weizmann Institute of Science and RSA professor at MIT
- John B. Goodenough, materials scientist, a solid-state physicist and recipient of the Nobel Prize in Chemistry in 2019
- Carol W. Greider, Daniel Nathans Professor and director of molecular biology and genetics at Johns Hopkins University and recipient of the Nobel Prize in Physiology or Medicine in 2009
- David Gross, theoretical physicist, string theorist and recipient of the Nobel Prize in Physics in 2004
- Andrej Grubačić, Yugoslav world-systems historian, professor and department chair of anthropology and social change at the California Institute of Integral Studies
- Robin Hahnel, economist, professor of economics at Portland State University
- Jeffrey C. Hall, geneticist, chronobiologist, professor Emeritus of Biology at Brandeis University and recipient of the Nobel Prize in Physiology or Medicine in 2017
- John L. Hall, physicist and recipient of the Nobel Prize in Physics in 2005
- Oliver Hart, economist, university professor at Harvard University, winner of the Nobel Memorial Prize in Economic Sciences in 2016
- Leland H. Hartwell, geneticist, former president, and director of the Fred Hutchinson Cancer Research Center, and recipient of the Nobel Prize in Physiology or Medicine in 2001
- Oona A. Hathaway, Gerard C. and Bernice Latrobe Smith Professor of International Law at Yale Law School
- Alan J. Heeger, physicist, academic and recipient of the Nobel Prize in Chemistry in 2000
- Dudley R. Herschbach, chemist at Harvard University and recipient of the Nobel Prize in Chemistry in 1986
- Roald Hoffmann, Holocaust survivor, theoretical chemist, Frank H. T. Rhodes Professor of Humane Letters, Emeritus, at Cornell University and recipient of the Nobel Prize in Chemistry in 1981
- H. Robert Horvitz, biologist and recipient of the Nobel Prize in Physiology or Medicine in 2002
- Louis Ignarro, pharmacologist, professor emeritus of pharmacology at the UCLA School of Medicine's department of molecular and medical pharmacology and recipient of the Nobel Prize in Physiology or Medicine in 1998
- William Kaelin Jr., physician-scientist, professor of medicine at Harvard University and the Dana–Farber Cancer Institute, and recipient of the Nobel Prize in Physiology or Medicine in 2019
- Daniel Kammen, Distinguished Professor of Energy in the Energy and Resources Group at the University of California, Berkeley
- Eric Kandel, medical doctor, neuroscientist, professor of biochemistry and biophysics at Columbia University and recipient of the Nobel Prize in Physiology or Medicine in 2000
- Rebecca Katz, professor and director of the Center for Global Health Science and Security at Georgetown University Medical Center
- Wolfgang Ketterle, physicist, professor of physics at the Massachusetts Institute of Technology and recipient of the Nobel Prize in Physics in 2001
- Brian Kobilka, physiologist, professor in the department of Molecular and Cellular Physiology at Stanford University School of Medicine and recipient of the Nobel Prize in Chemistry in 2012
- Roger D. Kornberg, biochemist, professor of structural biology at Stanford University and recipient of the Nobel Prize in Chemistry in 2006
- J. Michael Kosterlitz, physicist, professor of physics at Brown University and recipient of the Nobel Prize in Physics in 2016
- Herbert Kroemer, physicist, professor emeritus of electrical and computer engineering at the University of California, Santa Barbara and recipient of the Nobel Prize in Physics in 2000
- Robert B. Laughlin, theoretical physicist, Anne T. and Robert M. Bass Professor of Physics and Applied Physics at Stanford University and recipient of the Nobel Prize in Physics in 1998
- Yann LeCun, computer scientist and Silver Professor of the Courant Institute of Mathematical Sciences at New York University
- Robert J. Lefkowitz, physician, biochemist, professor of biochemistry and chemistry at Duke University and recipient of the Nobel Prize in Chemistry in 2012
- Anthony James Leggett, theoretical physicist. professor emeritus at the University of Illinois at Urbana-Champaign and recipient of the Nobel Prize in Physics in 2003
- Samuel T. Logan, professor of church history at Biblical Theological Seminary, ecclesiastic historian, Presbyterian minister
- Roderick MacKinnon, biophysicist, neuroscientist, professor of molecular neurobiology and biophysics at Rockefeller University and recipient of the Nobel Prize in Chemistry in 2003
- Michael E. Mann, director of the Earth System Science Center at Pennsylvania State University
- Eric Maskin, economist, Harvard University Professor, professor of economics and mathematics at Harvard University
- John C. Mather, cosmologist, senior astrophysicist at the NASA Goddard Space Flight Center (GSFC) in Maryland and adjunct professor of physics at the University of Maryland College of Computer, Mathematical, and Natural Sciences and recipient of the Nobel Prize in Physics in 2006
- Robert W. McChesney, Gutgsell Endowed Professor in the department of communication at the University of Illinois at Urbana–Champaign
- Daniel McFadden, econometrician, recipient of the Nobel Memorial Prize in Economic Sciences in 2000, Presidential Professor of Health Economics at the University of Southern California, professor of the Graduate School at University of California, Berkeley
- Bill McKibben, environmentalist, author, journalist, Schumann Distinguished Scholar at Middlebury College, leader of 350.org
- Jon Meacham, writer, presidential biographer and Carolyn T. and Robert M. Rogers Endowed Chair in American Presidency at Vanderbilt University
- Craig Mello, biologist, professor of molecular medicine at the University of Massachusetts Medical School and recipient of the Nobel Prize in Physiology or Medicine in 2006
- Paul L. Modrich, biochemist, James B. Duke Professor of biochemistry at Duke University, investigator at the Howard Hughes Medical Institute and recipient of the Nobel Prize in Chemistry in 2015
- William E. Moerner, physical chemist and chemical physicist and recipient of the Nobel Prize in Chemistry in 2014
- Mario J. Molina, chemist, professor at the University of California, San Diego and recipient of the Nobel Prize in Chemistry in 1995
- Richard Mouw, former president of the Fuller Theological Seminary, theologian, philosopher
- Roger Myerson, economist, recipient of the Nobel Memorial Prize in Economic Sciences in 2007, David L. Pearson Distinguished Service Professor of Global Conflict Studies at the University of Chicago
- Shuji Nakamura, electronic engineer, professor at the College of Engineering, University of California, Santa Barbara (UCSB)and recipient of the Nobel Prize in Physics in 2014
- Jeremy Nathans, professor of molecular biology and genetics at Johns Hopkins University
- Tom Nichols, professor of national security affairs at the U.S. Naval War College and Harvard Extension School
- William Nordhaus, economist, recipient of the Nobel Memorial Prize in Economic Sciences in 2018, Sterling Professor of Economics at Yale University
- John O'Keefe, neuroscientist, psychologist, professor at the Sainsbury Wellcome Centre for Neural Circuits and Behaviour and the Research Department of Cell and Developmental Biology at University College London, and recipient of the Nobel Prize in Physiology or Medicine in 2014
- Paul Ortiz, historian, professor of history at the University of Florida, director of the Samuel Proctor Oral History Program
- Douglas Osheroff, physicist, J. G. Jackson and C. J. Wood Professor of Physics, Emeritus at Stanford University and recipient of the Nobel Prize in Physics in 2012
- Jim Peebles, astrophysicist, astronomer, theoretical cosmologist who is currently the Albert Einstein Professor of Science, Emeritus, at Princeton University and recipient of the Nobel Prize in Physics in 2019
- Arno Allan Penzias, physicist, radio astronomer and recipient of the Nobel Prize in Physics in 1978
- Saul Perlmutter, astrophysicist at the Lawrence Berkeley National Laboratory, professor of physics at the University of California, Berkeley and recipient of the Nobel Prize in Physics in 2011
- Taylor G. Petrey, scholar of religion, former associate professor and research associate at Harvard Divinity School
- Edmund Phelps, economist, recipient of the Nobel Memorial Prize in Economic Sciences, former McVickar Professor of Political Economy at Columbia University
- Anthony B. Pinn, Agnes Cullen Arnold Professor of Humanities and Professor of Religious Studies at Rice University
- Hugh David Politzer, theoretical physicist and recipient of the Nobel Prize in Physics in 2004
- Paul Romer, economist, recipient of the Nobel Memorial Prize in Economic Sciences in 2018, former professor of economics at University of Chicago, University of California, Berkeley, Stanford Graduate School of Business, and University of Rochester, former World Bank Chief Economist (2016–2018)
- Michael Rosbash, geneticist, chronobiologist, professor and researcher at Brandeis University, recipient of the Nobel Prize in Physiology or Medicine in 2017
- James Rothman, biochemist, Fergus F. Wallace Professor of Biomedical Sciences at Yale University and recipient of the Nobel Prize in Physiology or Medicine in 2013
- Joseph Sakran, assistant professor of surgery at the Johns Hopkins University
- Barbara A. Schaal, professor of evolutionary biology, dean of Arts and Sciences at Washington University (2013–present)
- Randy Schekman, professor of cell biology at the University of California, Berkeley and recipient of the Nobel Prize in Physiology or Medicine in 2013
- Brian Schmidt, astrophysicist, vice-chancellor of the Australian National University and recipient of the Nobel Prize in Physics in 2011
- Juliet Schor, economist and Sociology Professor at Boston College
- Richard R. Schrock, chemist and recipient of the Nobel Prize in Chemistry in 2005
- Gregg L. Semenza, physician, professor of genetic medicine at the Johns Hopkins School of Medicine, and recipient of the Nobel Prize in Physiology or Medicine in 2019
- Stephen Shalom, professor of political science at William Paterson University (Socialist Party of America)
- Karl Barry Sharpless, chemist and recipient of the Nobel Prize in Chemistry in 2001
- Drew Shindell, physicist and professor of climate science at Duke University
- Ron Sider, theologian, Distinguished Professor of Theology, Holistic Ministry and Public Policy at the Palmer Theological Seminary of St. Davids, Pennsylvania, social activist
- Hamilton O. Smith, microbiologist and recipient of the Nobel Prize in Physiology or Medicine in 1978
- Kirk R. Smith, professor of Global Environmental Health at the University of California, Berkeley
- Adam Sobel, professor of applied physics, applied mathematics, and earth sciences at Columbia University
- Sean Solomon, William B. Ransford Professor of Earth and Planetary Science and director of the Lamont–Doherty Earth Observatory at Columbia University
- Robert Solow, economist, Eremitus Institute Professor of economics at the Massachusetts Institute of Technology, recipient of the Nobel Memorial Prize in Economic Sciences in 1987
- Alfred Sommer, ophthalmologist and epidemiologist at the Johns Hopkins Bloomberg School of Public Health
- Michael Spence, economist, professor William R. Berkley Professor in Economics and Business at the Stern School of Business at New York University, Philip H. Knight Professor of Management, Emeritus, and dean at the Stanford Graduate School of Business, recipient of the Nobel Memorial Prize in Economic Sciences in 2001
- Fraser Stoddart, chemist, Board of Trustees Professor of Chemistry and head of the Stoddart Mechanostereochemistry Group in the department of chemistry at Northwestern University and recipient of the Nobel Prize in Chemistry in 2016
- Thomas C. Südhof, biochemist, professor at Stanford University and recipient of the Nobel Prize in Physiology or Medicine in 2013
- Karel Svoboda, neuroscientist at Howard Hughes Medical Institute's Janelia Research Campus
- Jack W. Szostak, biologist, professor of genetics at Harvard Medical School, Alexander Rich Distinguished Investigator at Massachusetts General Hospital, Boston, and recipient of the Nobel Prize in Physiology or Medicine in 2009
- Joseph Hooton Taylor Jr. astrophysicist and recipient of the Nobel Prize in Physics in 1993
- Richard Thaler, economist, Charles R. Walgreen Distinguished Service Professor of Behavioral Science and Economics at the University of Chicago Booth School of Business, recipient of the Nobel Memorial Prize in Economic Sciences in 2017
- Kip Thorne, theoretical physicist and recipient of the Nobel Prize in Physics in 2017
- Susumu Tonegawa, molecular biologist, neuroscientist, and recipient of the Nobel Prize in Physiology or Medicine in 1987
- Laurence Tribe, Carl M. Loeb University Professor at Harvard Law School
- Daniel C. Tsui, physicist, Arthur Legrand Doty Professor of Electrical Engineering, emeritus, at Princeton University and recipient of the Nobel Prize in Physics in 1998
- Harold E. Varmus, biologist, former director of the National Institutes of Health, former director of the National Cancer Institute, Lewis Thomas University Professor of Medicine at Weill Cornell Medicine and recipient of the Nobel Prize in Physiology or Medicine in 1989
- Burton Visotzky, scholar of Midrash, Appleman Professor of Midrash and Interreligious Studies at the Jewish Theological Seminary of America
- Rainer Weiss, physicist, professor of physics, emeritus, at the Massachusetts Institute of Technology and recipient of the Nobel Prize in Physics in 2017
- Cornel West, historian
- Maureen White, senior fellow at the Foreign Policy Institute at Johns Hopkins School of Advanced International Studies
- M. Stanley Whittingham, chemist, professor of chemistry, director of both the Institute for Materials Research and the Materials Science and Engineering program at Binghamton University and recipient of the Nobel Prize in Chemistry in 2019
- Eric F. Wieschaus, evolutionary developmental biologist and recipient of the Nobel Prize in Physiology or Medicine in 1995
- Torsten Wiesel, neurophysiologist and recipient of the Nobel Prize in Physiology or Medicine in 1981
- Frank Wilczek, theoretical physicist, mathematician, Herman Feshbach Professor of Physics at the Massachusetts Institute of Technology (MIT), and recipient of the Nobel Prize in Physics in 2004
- Robert Woodrow Wilson, astronomer and recipient of the Nobel Prize in Physics in 1978
- David J. Wineland, physicist at the National Institute of Standards and Technology and recipient of the Nobel Prize in Physics in 2012
- Michael W. Young, biologist, geneticist, and recipient of the Nobel Prize in Physiology or Medicine in 2017

== Activists and public figures ==
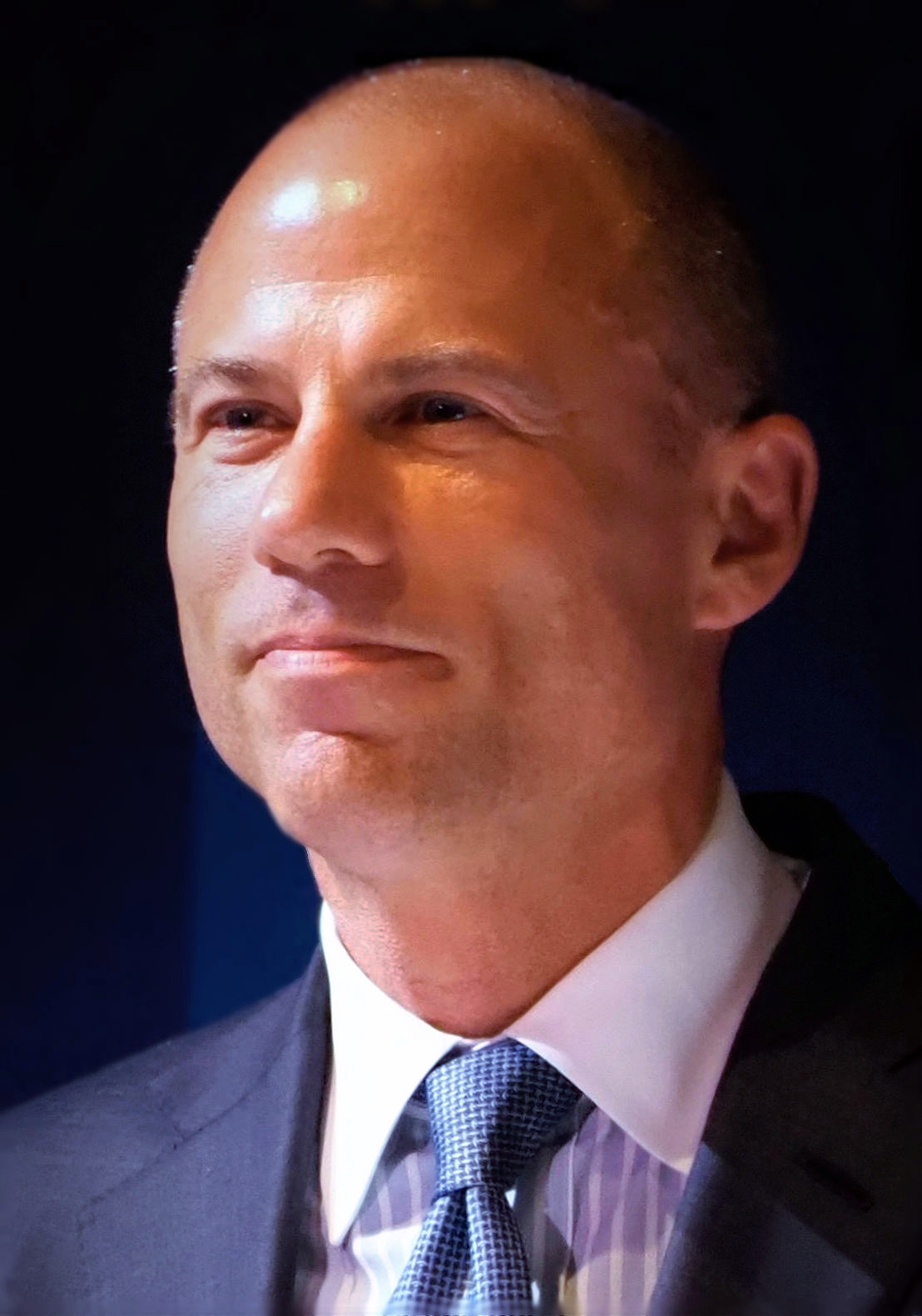
Michael Avenatti

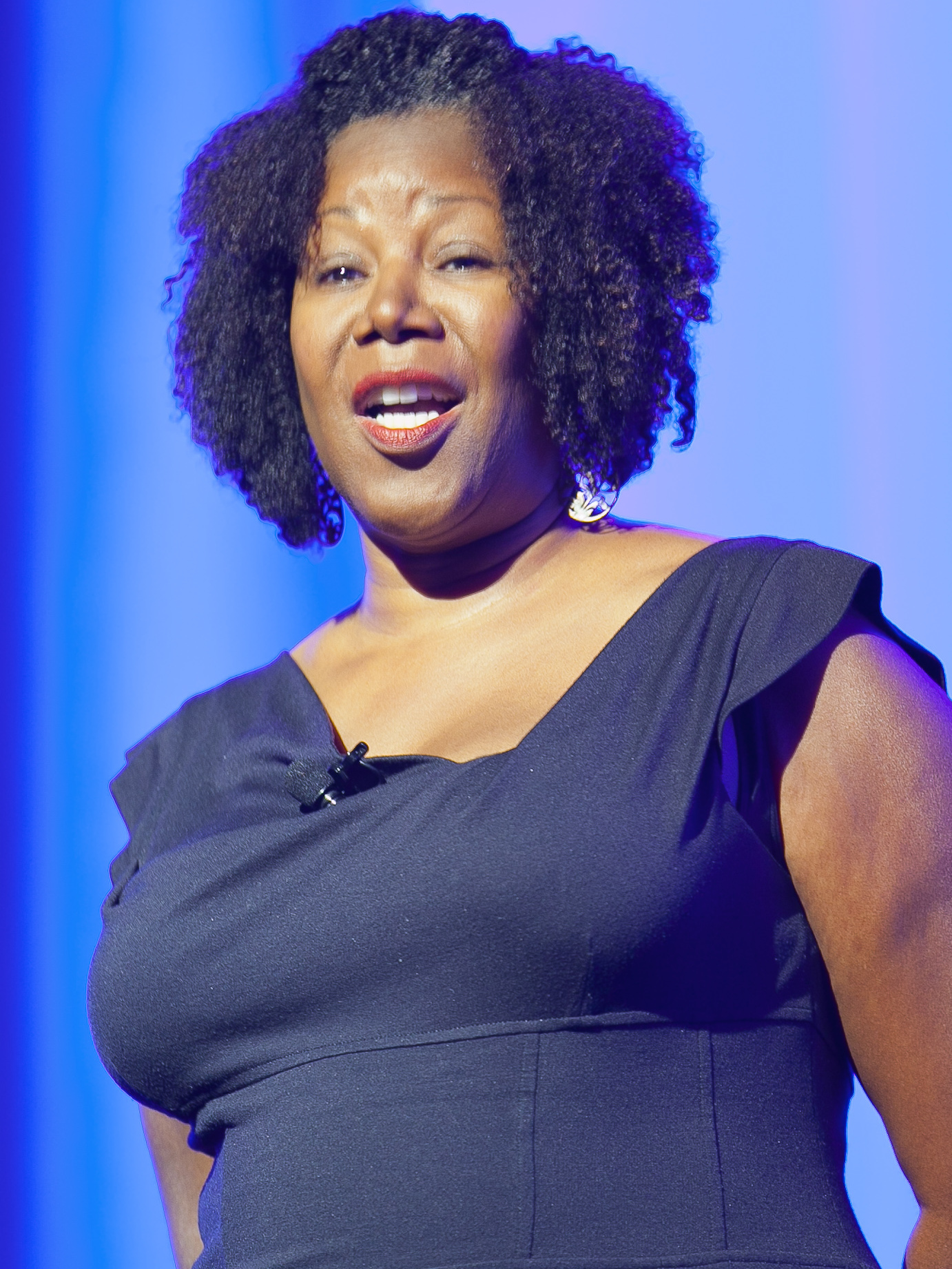
Ruby Bridges

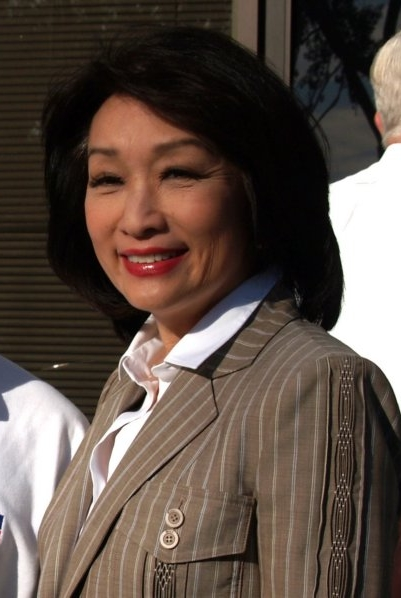
Connie Chung

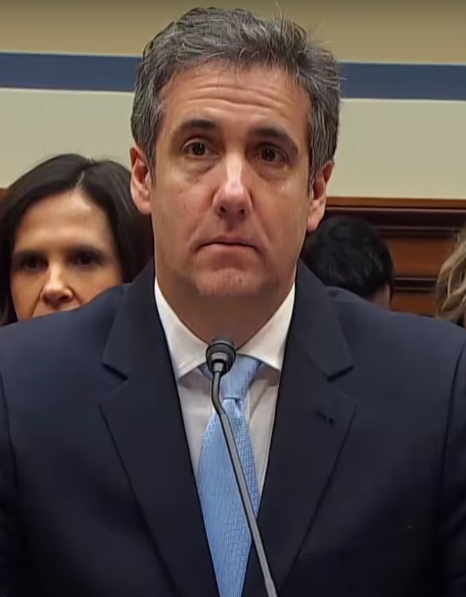
Michael Cohen

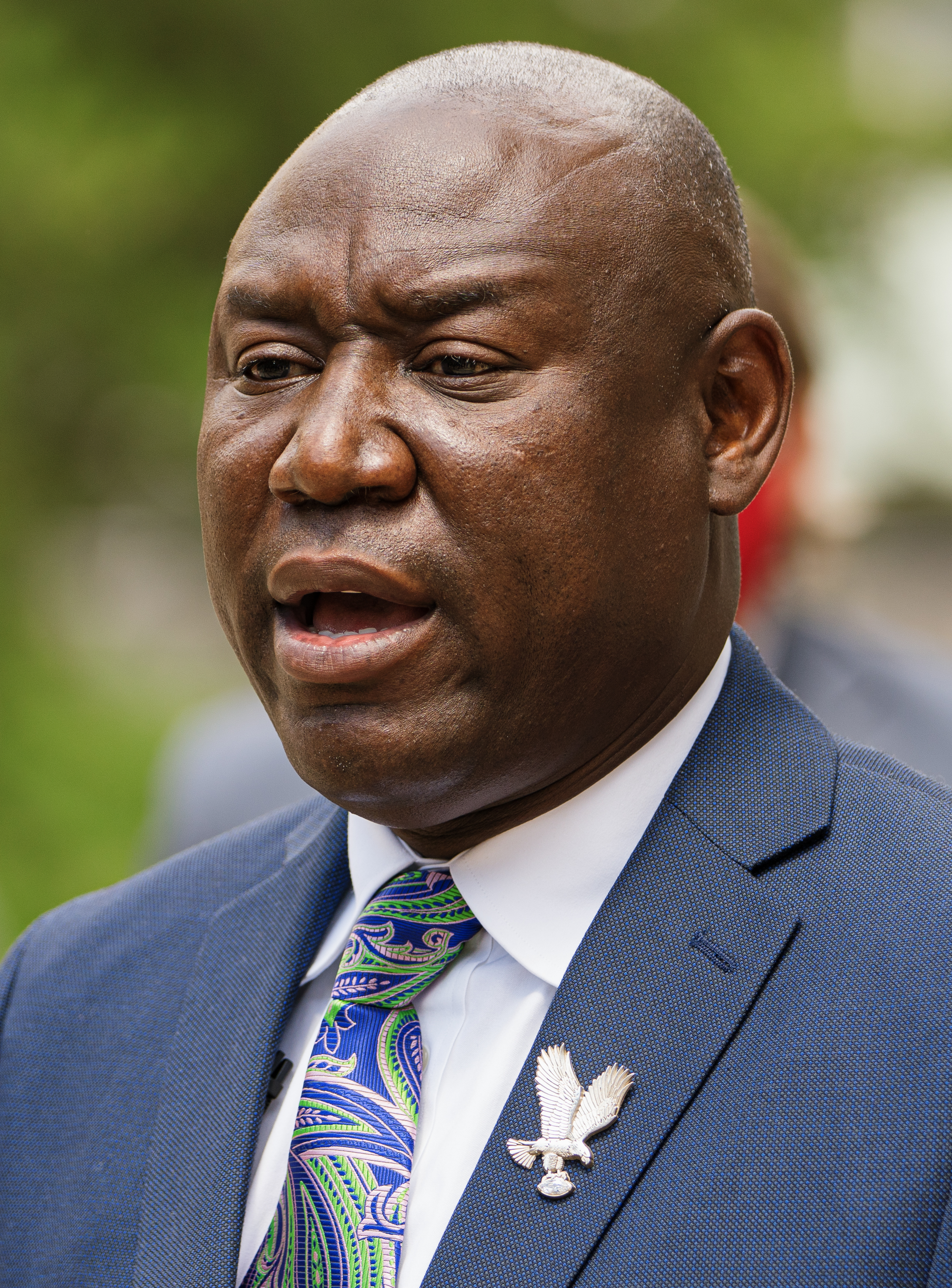
Benjamin Crump

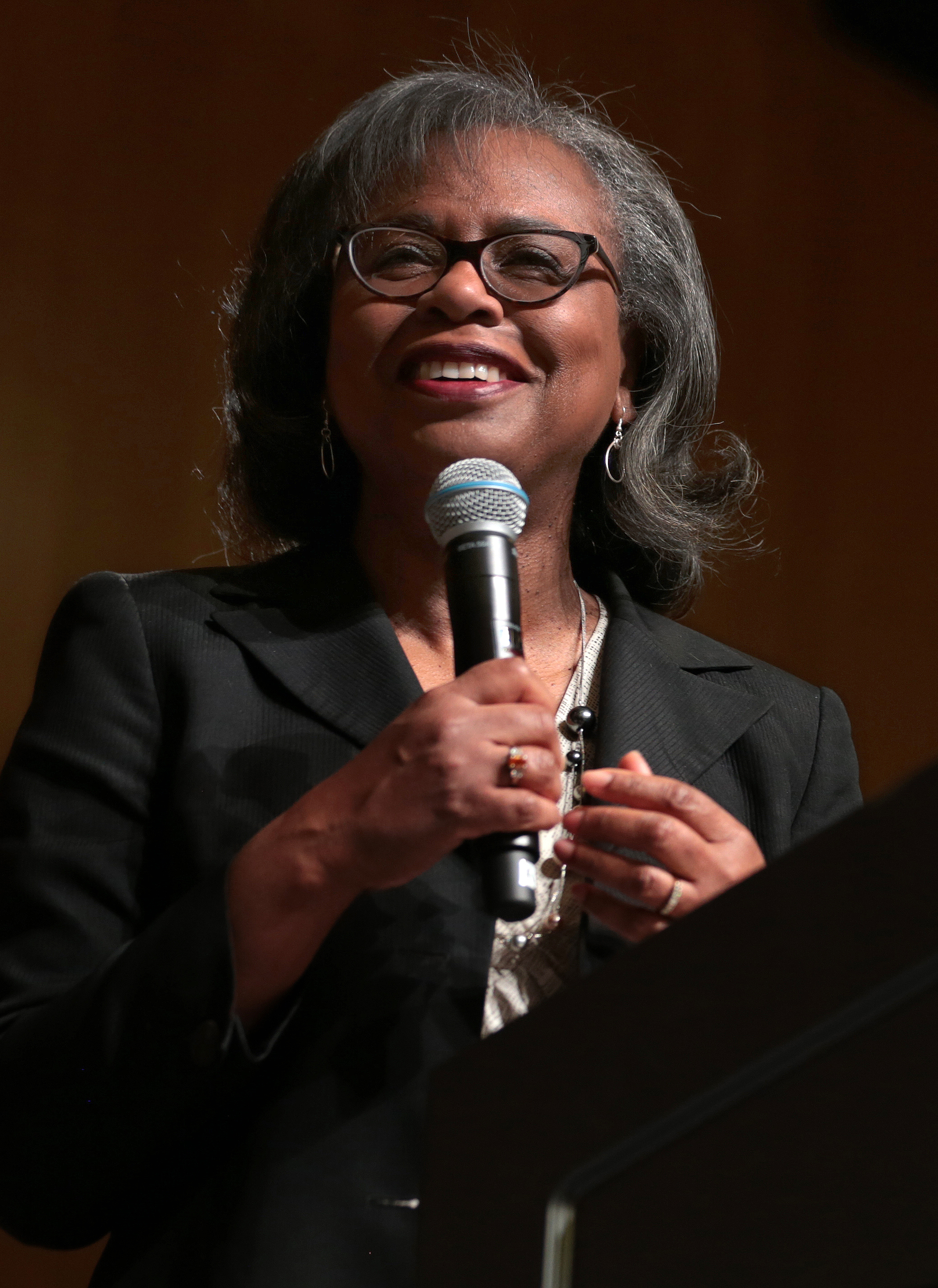
Anita Hill

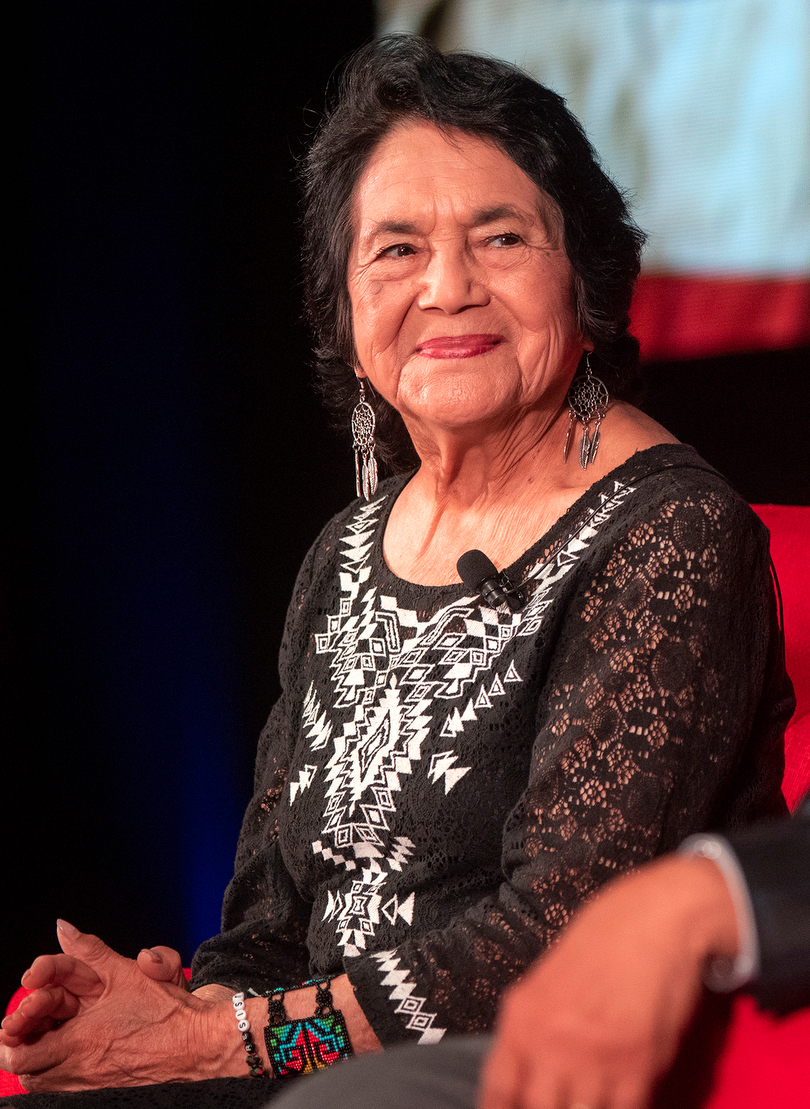
Dolores Huerta

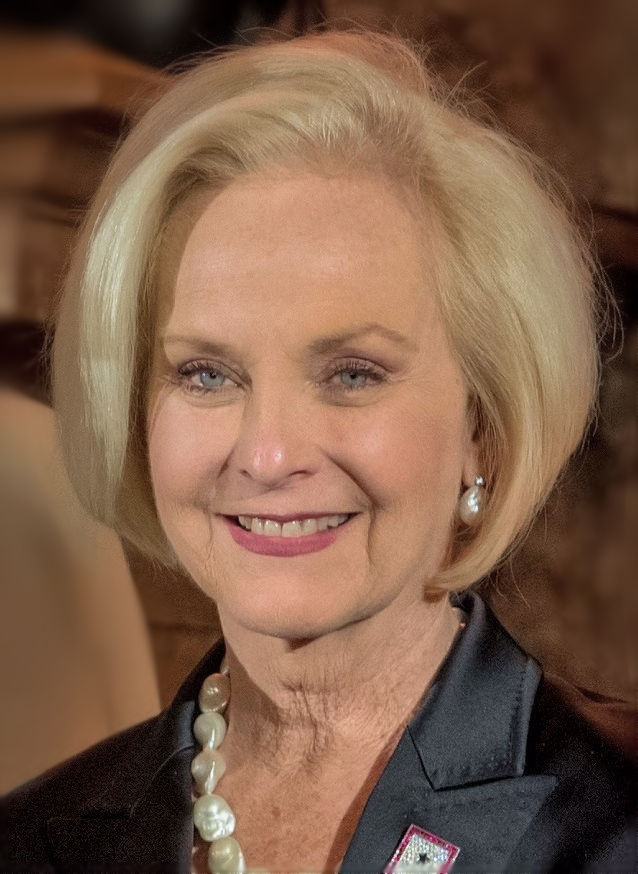
Cindy McCain

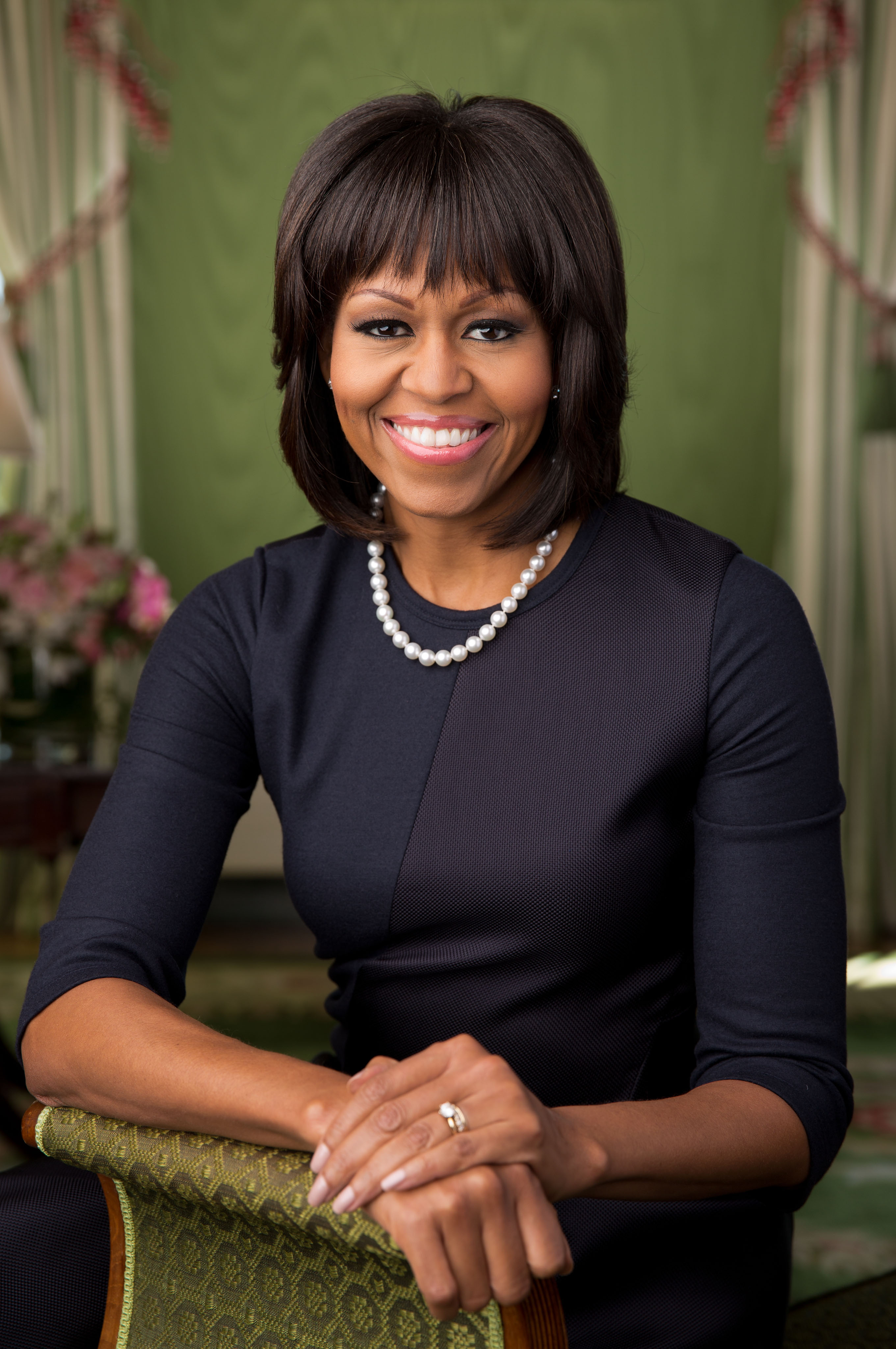
Michelle Obama

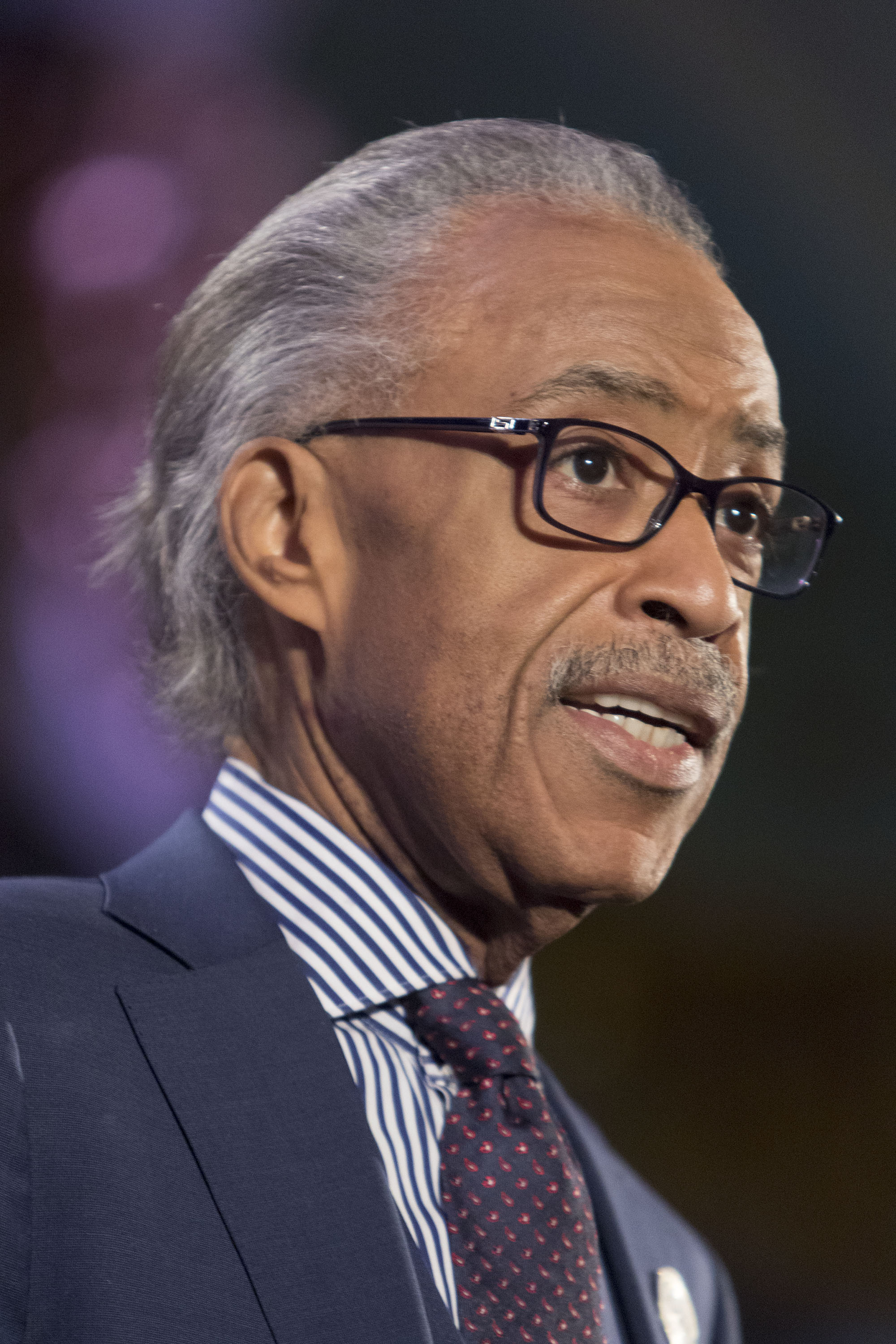
Al Sharpton

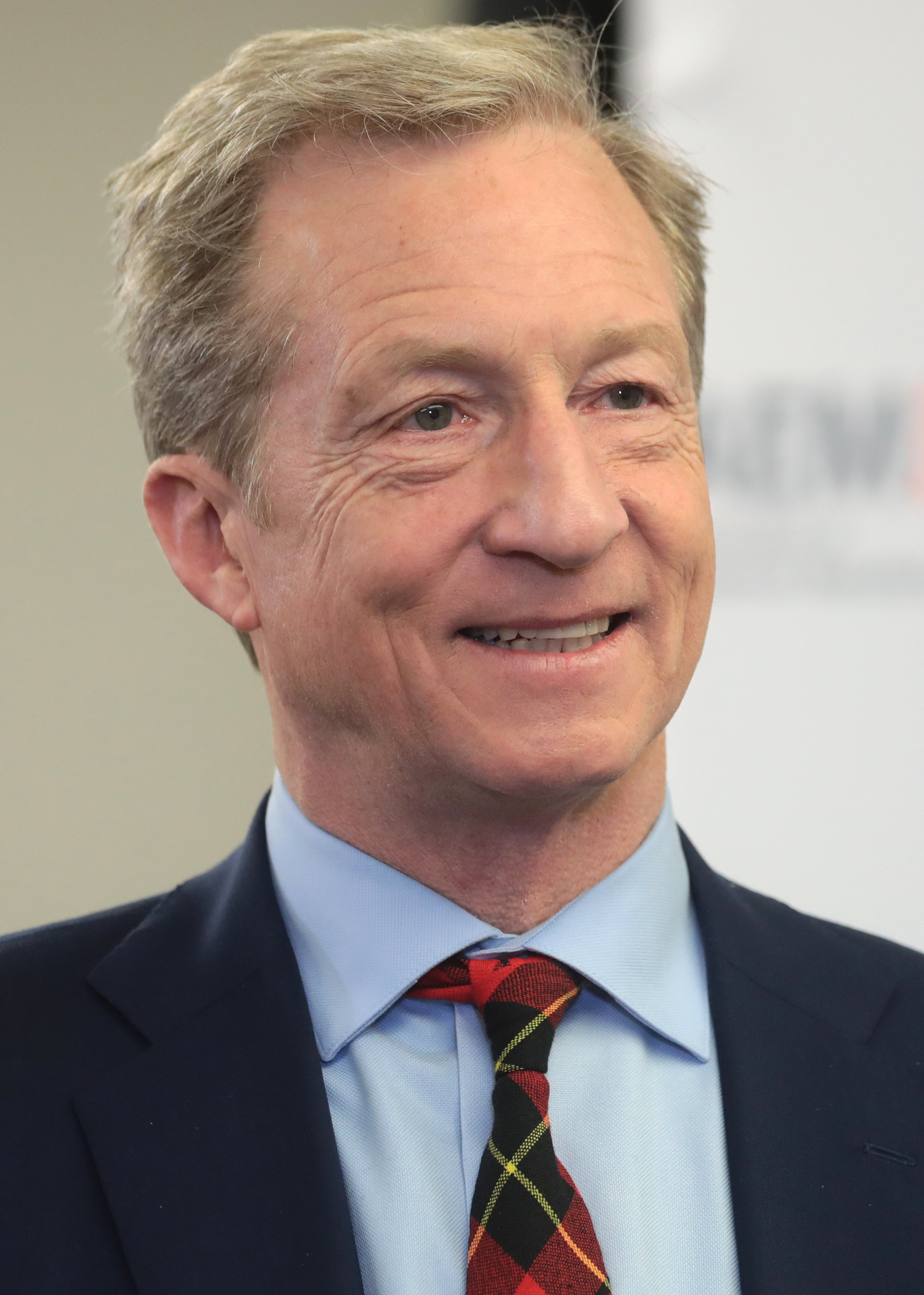
Tom Steyer

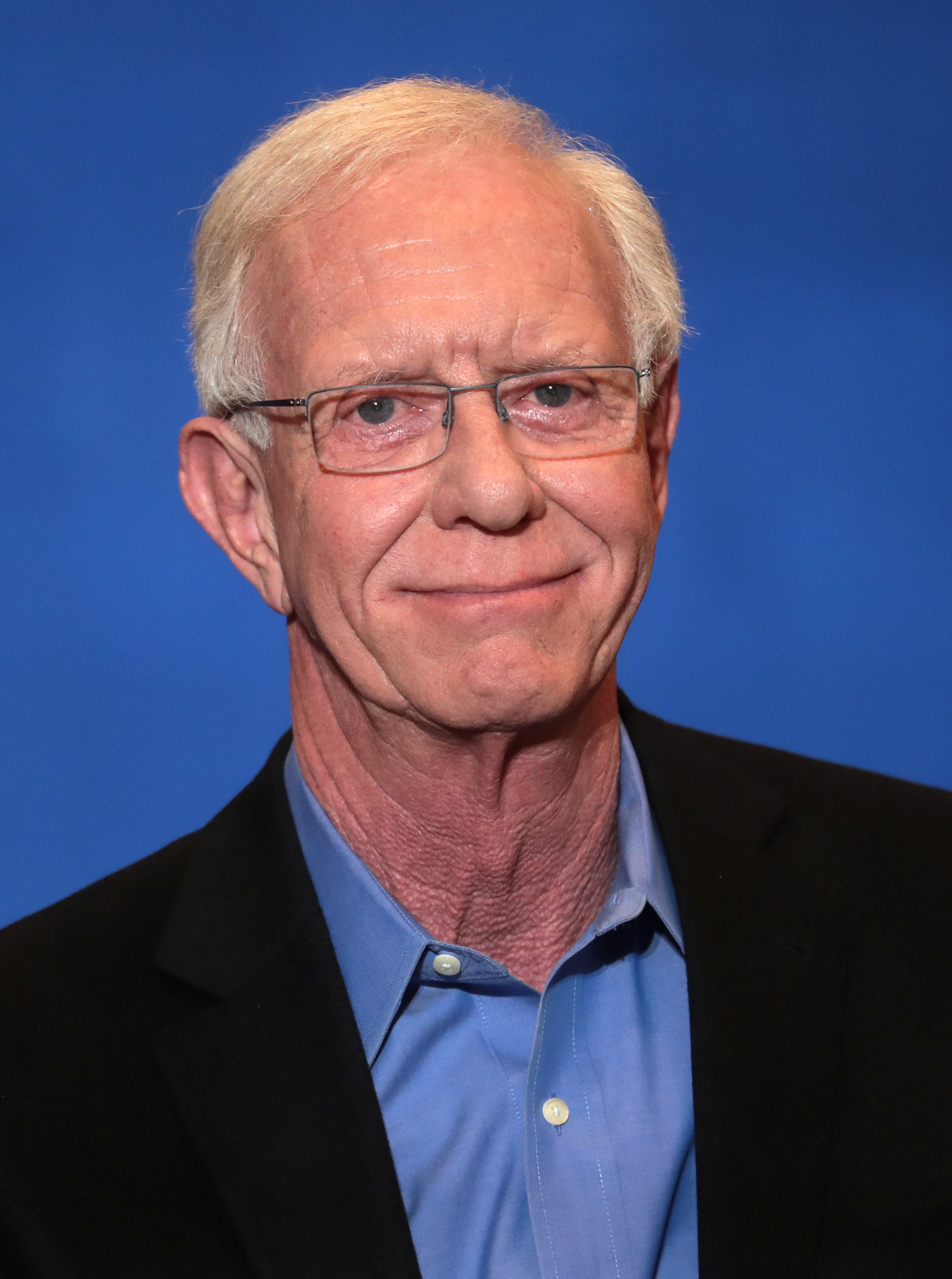
Sully Sullenberger

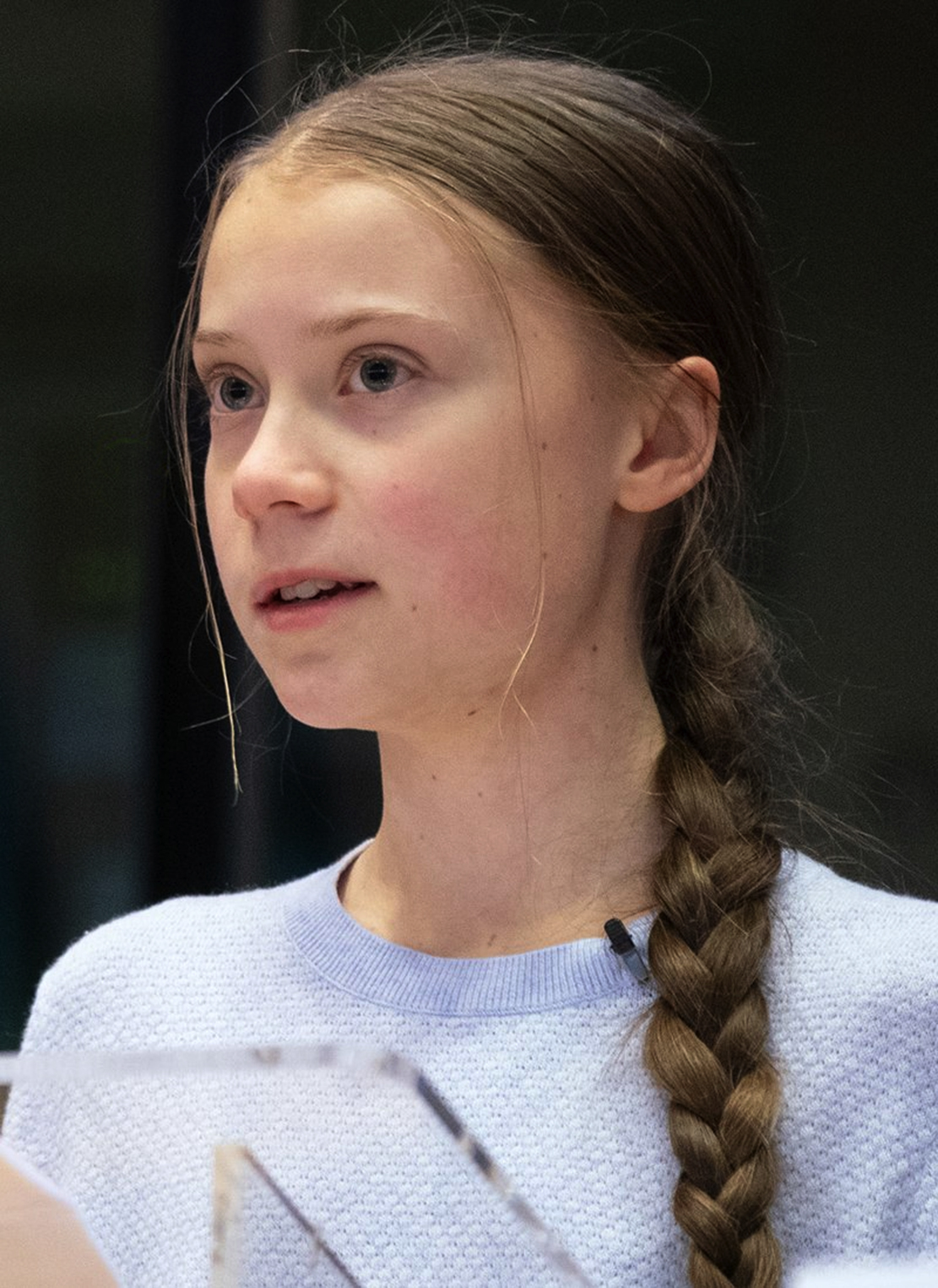
Greta Thunberg

- Clay Aiken, Democratic candidate for NC-02 in 2014, singer, television personality, actor, activist
- Michael Albert, economist, speaker, writer, political critic
- Valerie Alexander, speaker, writer for The Huffington Post
- Aimee Allison, founder and president of She the People
- Debbie Almontaser, schoolteacher, Yemeni activist, founder of the Khalil Gibran International Academy
- Clayton Anderson, retired NASA astronaut, author, motivational speaker
- Bob Avakian, chairman of the Revolutionary Communist Party, USA (Revolutionary Communist)
- Michael Avenatti, former attorney to Stormy Daniels, convicted felon
- Ady Barkan, activist, attorney
- Lisa Blue Baron, trial lawyer
- David Barsamian, Armenian-American radio broadcaster, writer, founder and director of Alternative Radio
- Ryan J. Bell, atheist, former Seventh-day Adventist Pastor, contributor to HuffPost
- Medea Benjamin, political activist, co-founder of Code Pink
- Ruthie Berman, LGBT rights activist
- Megan Beyer, journalist, activist, advocate of women's rights and gender issues, former Second Lady of Virginia (1990–1998)
- Ashley Biden, Biden's daughter, social worker, activist, philanthropist, fashion designer
- Jill Biden, Second Lady of the United States (2009–2017), Biden's wife, educator
- Richard Bloomingdale, president of the Pennsylvania AFL–CIO (2010–2022)
- Max Boot, author, consultant, military historian, columnist for The Washington Post (Republican before 2016, now independent)
- Keith Boykin, progressive broadcaster, political commentator for CNN
- Greg Boyle, Roman Catholic priest of the Jesuit order, founder and director of Homeboy Industries
- Ruby Bridges, civil rights activist and the first African-American child to desegregate the all-white William Frantz Elementary School in Louisiana during the New Orleans school desegregation crisis
- Sharon Brous, senior rabbi at IKAR
- Amy Butler, Christian minister, former senior minister at the Riverside Church
- Leslie Cagan, activist, writer, socialist organizer
- Simone Campbell, Roman Catholic Religious Sister, lawyer, executive director of NETWORK
- Amanda Carpenter, author, political advisor, speechwriter (Republican)
- Gwen Carr, activist, public speaker, author, mother of police brutality victim Eric Garner
- Rosalynn Carter, First Lady of the United States (1977–1981) and First Lady of Georgia (1971–1975)
- James Carville, Democratic political consultant
- Mona Charen, columnist, journalist, political commentator, writer (Republican)
- Niki Christoff, economic policy advisor, campaign operative (Republican)
- Connie Chung, journalist, reporter, former evening news anchor
- Shane Claiborne, Christian activist, author
- Charlotte Clymer, LGBTQ+ activist, writer for The Washington Post
- Jeff Cohen, journalist, co-founder of RootsAction.org
- Michael Cohen, disbarred lawyer, former attorney of Donald Trump (Former Republican, later Democratic)
- Claudia Conway, liberal activist, daughter of Kellyanne Conway and George Conway
- George Conway, attorney, co-founder of The Lincoln Project (Republican before 2018, now Independent)
- Christian Cooper, LGBTQ+ activist, comic book writer, birder
- Phil Coorey, Australian journalist, political editor for The Australian Financial Review
- Benjamin Crump, civil rights lawyer
- Alphonso David, LGBTQ+ activist president of Human Rights Campaign (2019–2021)
- Susan Del Percio, political strategist, media analyst (Republican)
- Anthony Diekema, former president of Calvin University
- TJ Ducklo, political aide, media strategist
- Chaz Ebert, attorney, businesswoman
- Douglas Emhoff, entertainment lawyer, Harris's husband
- Adam C. Engst, publisher of TidBITS
- Greg Epstein, Humanist rabbi, chaplain at Harvard University and Massachusetts Institute of Technology
- Liza Featherstone, journalist, writer for The Nation and Jacobin
- Karen Finney, political commentator for CNN, spokesperson for the Hillary Clinton 2016 presidential campaign
- Mary Fisher, HIV/AIDS activist
- Abraham Foxman, lawyer, Holocaust survivor, national director of the Anti-Defamation League (1987–2015)
- Roxane Gay, writer, professor, editor
- Helene D. Gayle, doctor, CEO of the Chicago Community Trust
- Menachem Genack, Orthodox rabbi, CEO of the Orthodox Union Kosher Division
- Joseph Gerson, peace and disarmament activist
- Jeffrey Goldberg, journalist and editor-in-chief of The Atlantic magazine
- X González, gun control activist, co-founder of Never Again MSD
- Linda Gordon, feminist, historian
- Suzanne Gordon, journalist, author
- Chad Griffin, founder of American Foundation for Equal Rights, president of Human Rights Campaign (2012–2019)
- Eugene Gu, former resident physician, social media personality (previously endorsed Andrew Yang)
- Rhiana Gunn-Wright, Climate Policy Director at the Roosevelt Institute, co-author of the Green New Deal
- Bruce Guthrie, Australian journalist
- Fred Guttenberg, gun control activist, father of Stoneman Douglas High School shooting victim Jaime Guttenberg
- Maya Harris, lawyer, public policy advocate, television commentator, Harris' sister
- Meena Harris, lawyer, children's book author, founder of the Phenomenal Woman Action Campaign, Harris' niece
- Jill Hazelbaker, communications director for the 2008 McCain presidential campaign (Republican)
- Mary Kay Henry, labor leader, international president of SEIU
- Doug Henwood, journalist, economic analyst, author, financial trader
- Katrina vanden Heuvel, publisher, part-owner, and former editor of The Nation
- Anita Hill, lawyer, professor, accused Clarence Thomas of sexual harassment in 1991
- David Hogg, gun control activist, student who survived the Stoneman Douglas High School shooting
- Ilyse Hogue, progressive activist, president of NARAL Pro-Choice America
- Jared Hohlt, writer, editor of Slate
- Dolores Huerta, labor leader, civil rights activist, co-founder of United Farm Workers
- Coleman Hughes, writer, opinion columnist
- Joel Hunter, former senior pastor of Northland Church
- John Ibbitson, Canadian journalist, columnist for The Globe and Mail
- Ben Jealous, civil rights leader, president of People for the American Way (2020–2022)
- Karine Jean-Pierre, political campaign organizer, activist, political commentator, lecturer in international and public affairs at Columbia University
- Miriam Jerris, rabbi of the Society for Humanistic Judaism
- Alexis McGill Johnson, president and CEO of Planned Parenthood (2020–present)
- Derrick Johnson, lawyer, current CEO of the NAACP (2017–present)
- Molly Jong-Fast, author, liberal political commentator, editor-at-large at The Daily Beast
- Fred Kaplan, author, journalist, writer of the "War Stories" column for Slate
- Cameron Kasky, activist, gun control activist, co-founder of Never Again MSD (previously endorsed Andrew Yang)
- Valarie Kaur, activist, documentary filmmaker, lawyer, educator and faith leader
- Joshua Keating, foreign policy analyst, staff writer and author of the World blog at Slate
- Mara Keisling, founding executive director of the National Center for Transgender Equality
- Kathy Kelly, peace activist, pacifist, author
- Kate Kendell, former executive director of the National Center for Lesbian Rights
- Ibram X. Kendi, author, historian, activist, professor
- Victoria Reggie Kennedy, attorney, widow of former senator Ted Kennedy
- Khizr Khan, father of deceased U.S. Army Captain Humayun Khan
- Brian Klaas, political scientist, columnist for The Washington Post
- Sharon Kleinbaum, rabbi, spiritual leader of New York City's Congregation Beit Simchat Torah
- Jeff Klepper, cantor, Contemporary Jewish religious music influencer
- Howard Krein, Biden's son-in-law, otolaryngologist, plastic surgeon, business executive
- María Teresa Kumar, Colombian American political rights activist, president and CEO of Voto Latino
- Dan La Botz, labor union activist, academic, journalist, author (Socialist Party USA)
- Joy Ladin, poet and the David and Ruth Gottesman Chair in English at Stern College for Women at Yeshiva University
- Khalid Latif, imam
- James Lawson, activist in the Civil Rights Movement, pastor, professor
- Lilly Ledbetter, equal pay for equal work activist, lead plaintiff in the landmark employment discrimination Supreme Court case, Ledbetter v. Goodyear Tire & Rubber Co., namesake of the Lilly Ledbetter Fair Pay Act of 2009
- Robert W. Lee IV, activist, former pastor, descendant of Robert E. Lee
- Rodrigo Lehtinen, Cuban-American LGBT rights advocate
- Josh Levin, writer, executive editor at Slate
- Sarah Longwell, publisher of The Bulwark, former board chair of the Log Cabin Republicans (Republican)
- John R. MacArthur, journalist, president of Harper's Magazine
- Ben Mathis-Lilley, journalist, chief news blogger of Slate's news section Slatest
- Cindy McCain, businesswoman, philanthropist, humanitarian, widow of late Senator John McCain (Republican)
- Steve McIntosh, author, lawyer, entrepreneur
- Vashti Murphy McKenzie, Bishop of the African Methodist Episcopal Church
- Evan McMullin, activist, former CIA officer, 2016 independent candidate for President (Independent)
- Michael Medved, radio show host
- Mike Mignola, comics artist, writer
- Stuart Milk, LGBT rights activist, political speaker, nephew of civil rights leader Harvey Milk
- Laura Miller, journalist, critic, Books and Culture columnist at Slate
- Dale Minami, lawyer, represented Fred Korematsu in Korematsu v. United States
- Shannon Minter, civil rights attorney, legal director of the National Center for Lesbian Rights
- Jack Moline, Conservative rabbi, executive director of Interfaith Alliance
- Michael Mulgrew, president of the United Federation of Teachers (2009–present)
- Mike Murphy, political consultant, strategist (Republican)
- Tammy Murphy, First Lady of New Jersey (2018–present)
- William Murphy, former Bishop of the Roman Catholic Diocese of Rockville Centre
- Ana Navarro, political commentator, strategist (Republican)
- Bill Nye, science communicator, television presenter, and mechanical engineer
- Michelle Obama, activist, First Lady of the United States (2009–2017)
- Jim Obergefell, lead plaintiff in landmark civil rights Supreme Court case Obergefell v. Hodges
- Jen O'Malley Dillon, political strategist, campaign manager for the Joe Biden 2020 presidential campaign, campaign manager for the Beto O'Rourke 2020 presidential campaign
- Howard Opinsky, national press secretary of the 2000 McCain presidential campaign (Republican)
- Doug Pagitt, progressive evangelical pastor, author
- Claudia Palacios, Colombian journalist, former news anchor for CNN en Español
- John M. Perkins, Christian minister, civil rights activist, Bible teacher, best-selling author, philosopher, community developer
- Mike Pesca, radio journalist, host of Slate’s podcast The Gist
- Alexandra Petri, humorist, columnist for The Washington Post
- Megan Phelps-Roper, former member and spokesperson of the Westboro Baptist Church
- Leonard Pitts, commentator, journalist, and novelist
- Abigail Pogrebin, writer, journalist, podcast host for Tablet magazine, former director of Jewish Outreach for the Michael Bloomberg 2020 presidential campaign
- Katha Pollitt, post, essayist, critic
- Dan Rather, journalist, former national evening news anchor
- Irwin Redlener, pediatrician, public health activist
- Cecile Richards, former president of Planned Parenthood
- Laura Ricketts, former attorney, first openly gay owner of a major-league sports franchise
- Gene Robinson, former bishop of the Episcopal Diocese of New Hampshire
- Julie Chavez Rodriguez, political rights activist, designated director of the White House Office of Intergovernmental Affairs for Biden
- Joanne Rogers, widow of Fred Rogers
- Shmuel Rosner, Israeli columnist, editor, researcher
- Jonathan Rotenberg, executive coach, co-founder of the Boston Computer Society
- Jennifer Rubin, journalist, columnist for The Washington Post (Independent)
- Faiza Saeed, attorney, partner at Cravath, Swaine & Moore
- Bamby Salcedo, founder of TransLatina Coalition
- William Saletan, writer and national correspondent at Slate
- Mark Salter, speechwriter of the 2008 McCain presidential campaign (Republican)
- David Sanford, civil rights attorney
- Lydia Sargent, feminist, writer, author, playwright, actor
- Harut Sassounian, Armenian-American writer, public activist, publisher of The California Courier
- Reshma Saujani, lawyer, founder of Girls Who Code
- Andrea Saul, press secretary of the 2012 Romney presidential campaign (Republican)
- Rob Schenck, Evangelical clergyman, president of the Dietrich Bonhoeffer Institute
- Jack Schlossberg, writer, grandson of former president John F. Kennedy
- Steve Schmidt, chief strategist for the John McCain 2008 presidential campaign, co-founder of The Lincoln Project (Republican before 2018, now Democrat)
- Stephen F. Schneck, Catholic activist, executive director of Franciscan Action Network
- Stephanie Schriock, political strategist and president of EMILY's List
- Stuart Schuffman, contemporary travel writer, blogger
- Connie Schultz, writer, journalist, wife of Senator Sherrod Brown
- Jacques Servin, leading member of The Yes Men
- Tara Setmayer, CNN political commentator, contributor to ABC News (Republican)
- Fawn Sharp, politician, attorney, president of the National Congress of American Indians (since 2019)
- Al Sharpton, civil rights activist, Baptist minister, talk show host
- Dennis Shepard, father of Matthew Shepard, co-founder of the Matthew Shepard Foundation, LGBTQ+ activist
- Judy Shepard, mother of Matthew Shepard, co-founder of the Matthew Shepard Foundation, LGBTQ+ activist
- Maria Shriver, journalist, author, First Lady of California (2003–2011) (Independent)
- Timothy Shriver, chairman of the Special Olympics, disability rights activist, film producer, member of the Kennedy family
- Ron Sider, theologian, social activist and founder of Evangelicals for Social Action
- Simran Jeet Singh, educator, writer and activist
- Marina Sitrin, writer, professor, lawyer, activist
- Norman Solomon, journalist, activist, co-founder of RootsAction.org
- Mohamed Soltan, Egyptian-American human rights advocate, former political prisoner in Egypt
- Andy Spahn, political activist, consultant
- Roy Speckhardt, executive director of the American Humanist Association, author
- Richard B. Spencer, neo-Nazi, antisemitic conspiracy theorist, white supremacist (endorsement rejected by Biden)
- Andrea Dew Steele, co-founder of Emerge California
- Bret Stephens, recipient of the Pulitzer Prize, conservative journalist, editor, columnist
- Stuart Stevens, writer and senior political strategist for Mitt Romney's 2012 presidential campaign (Republican)
- Tom Steyer, hedge fund manager, liberal activist, philanthropist, 2020 candidate for president
- Mac Stipanovich, political activist, strategist
- Sully Sullenberger, former U.S. Air Force captain and commercial airline pilot during the water landing of US Airways Flight 1549
- Charlie Sykes, conservative talk show radio host, founder of The Bulwark (Republican)
- Greta Thunberg, Swedish environmental activist and de facto leader of the school strike for climate movement
- Richard Trumka, president of the AFL–CIO (2009–2021), president of the United Mine Workers (1982–1995)
- Mary L. Trump, psychologist, businessperson, author, niece of Donald Trump
- Cristina Tzintzún Ramirez, labor organizer, writer
- Cenk Uygur, liberal political commentator, media host, journalist
- Alexandria Villaseñor, climate activist, co-founder of US Youth Climate Strike
- Christie Vilsack, First Lady of Iowa (1999–2007), 2012 nominee for IA-04
- Ou Virak, Cambodian human rights activist, public intellect
- Suzyn Waldman, sportscaster
- Dane Waters, campaign strategist (Republican)
- Mikal Watts, attorney
- Jeff Weaver, president of Our Revolution (2016–2017), campaign manager for the Bernie Sanders 2016 presidential campaign, advisor to the Bernie Sanders 2020 presidential campaign
- John Weaver, political consultant, chief strategist for the John Kasich 2016 presidential campaign, co-founder of The Lincoln Project (Republican)
- Peter Wehner, writer for The New York Times, former speechwriter (Republican)
- Randi Weingarten, president of the American Federation of Teachers (2008–present), president of the United Federation of Teachers (1998–2008), labor leader, attorney, educator
- Perry Weitz, attorney, partner at Weitz & Luxenberg P.C.
- George Will, journalist, columnist for The Washington Post (Formerly Republican, now Independent since 2016)
- John Eddie Williams, pharmaceutical injury and mass tort attorney
- Gregory Wilpert, German activist, founder of Venezuelanalysis.com
- Nancy Wilson, cleric, former moderator of the Universal Fellowship of Metropolitan Community Churches
- Rick Wilson, political strategist, media consultant, author, co-founder of The Lincoln Project (Former Republican, now Independent since 2019)
- Jonathan Wilson-Hartgrove, writer, Baptist preacher
- Mark Winer, interfaith activist, rabbi
- Evan Wolfson, attorney, gay rights activist, founder and president of Freedom to Marry
- Eric Yoffie, rabbi, president of the Union for Reform Judaism (1996–2012)
- Rick Zbur, executive director of Equality California
- James Zogby, founder and president of the Arab American Institute
- Marc Zwillinger, founder and managing member of the privacy and information security law firm ZwillGen

== Business executives and leaders ==
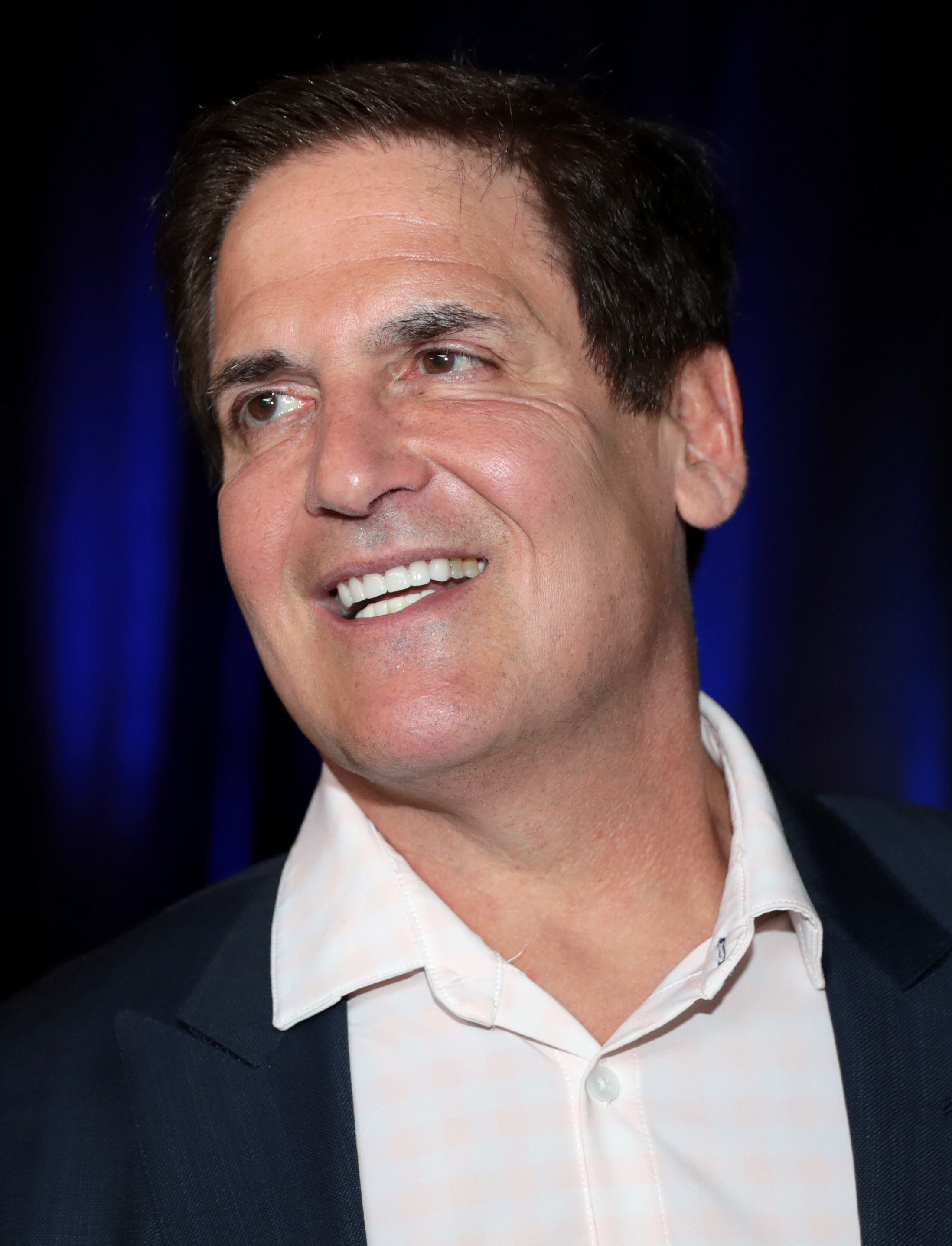
Mark Cuban

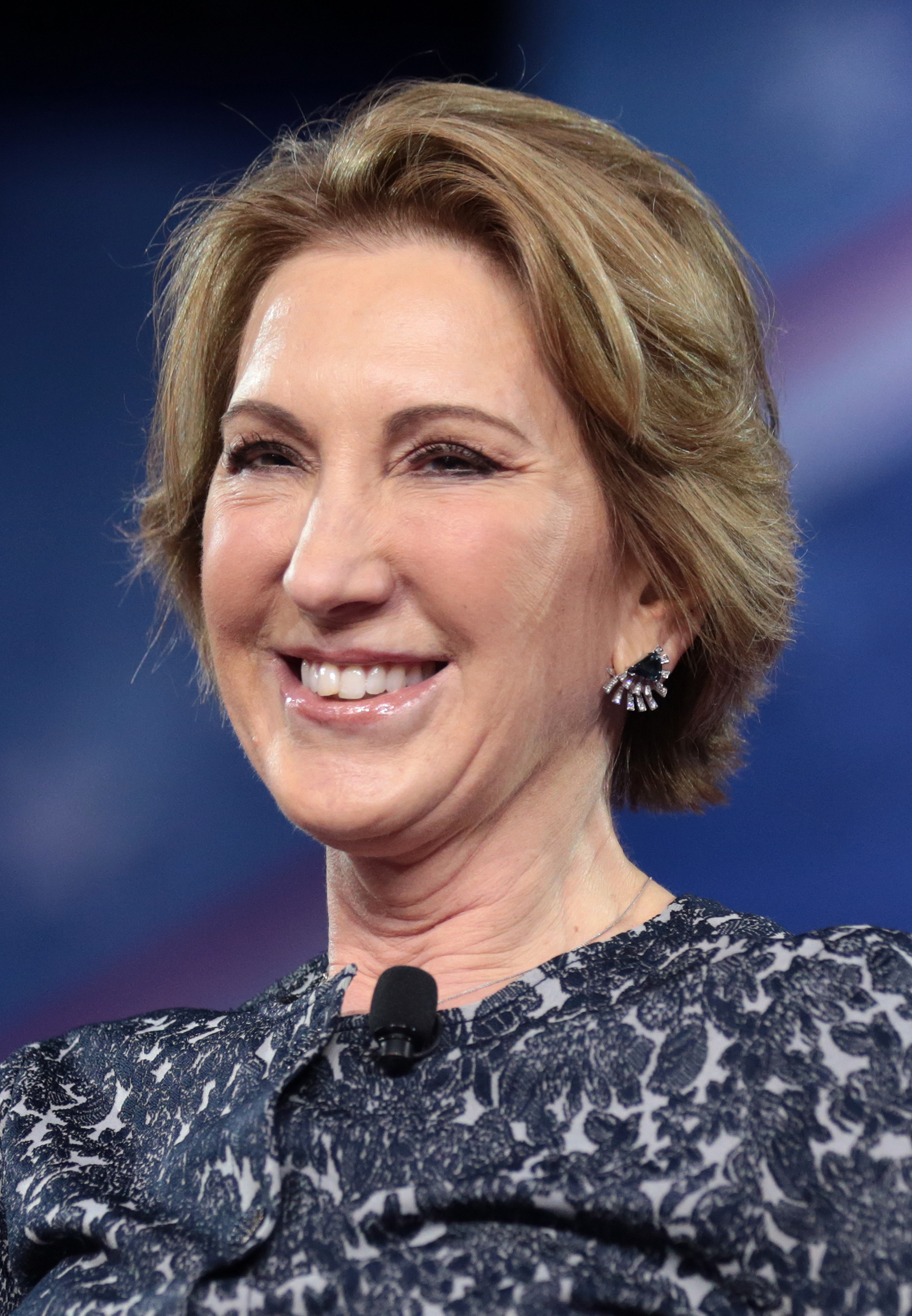
Carly Fiorina

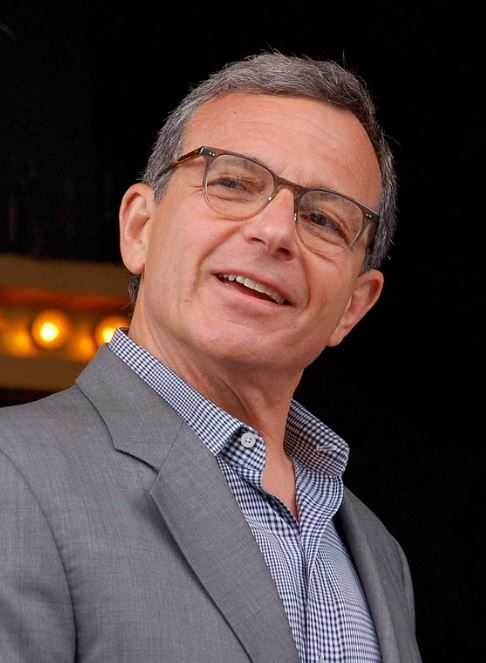
Bob Iger

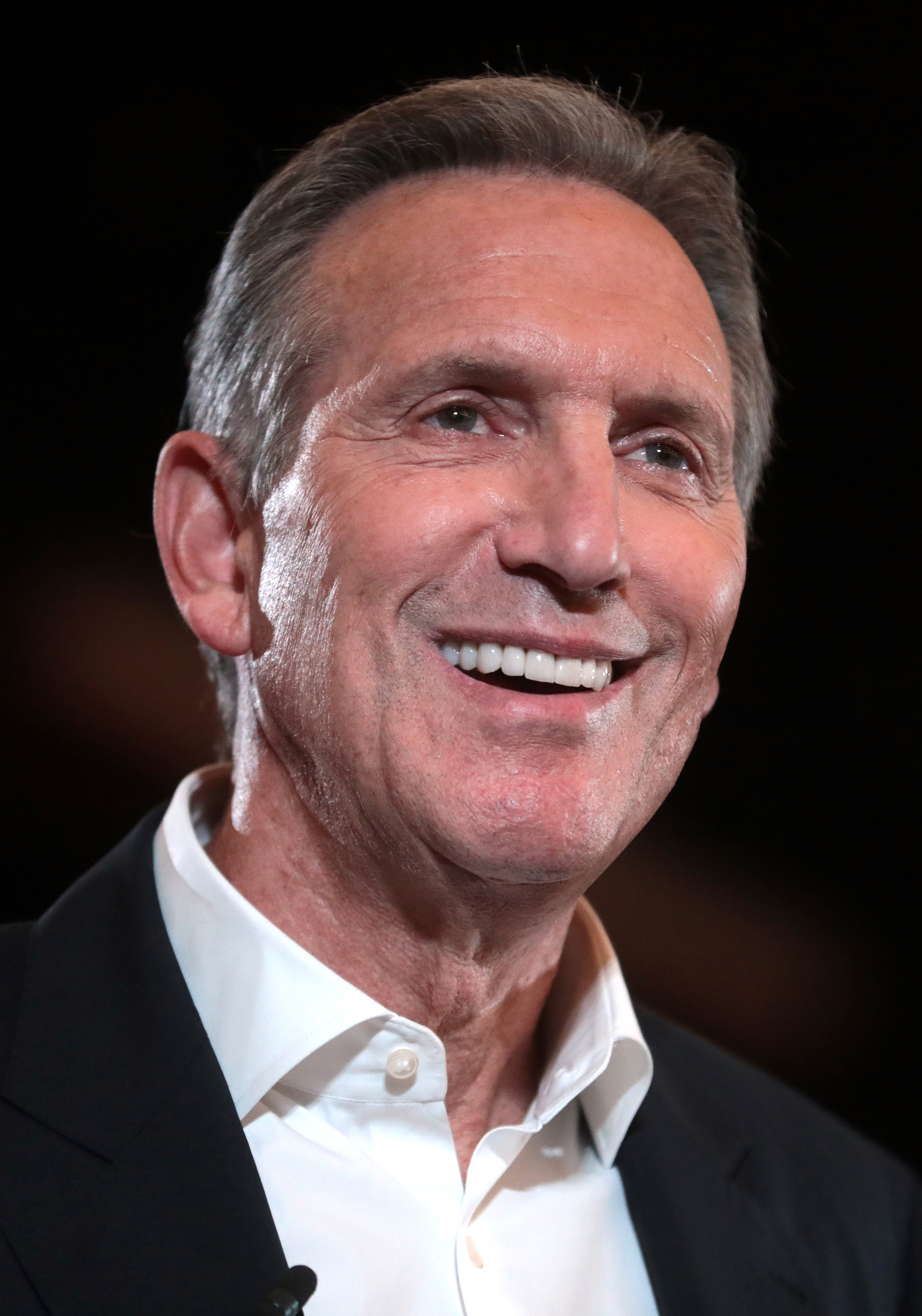
Howard Schultz

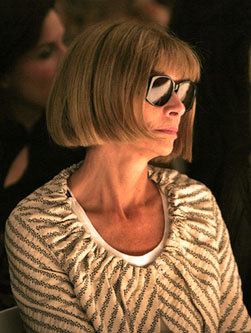
Anna Wintour

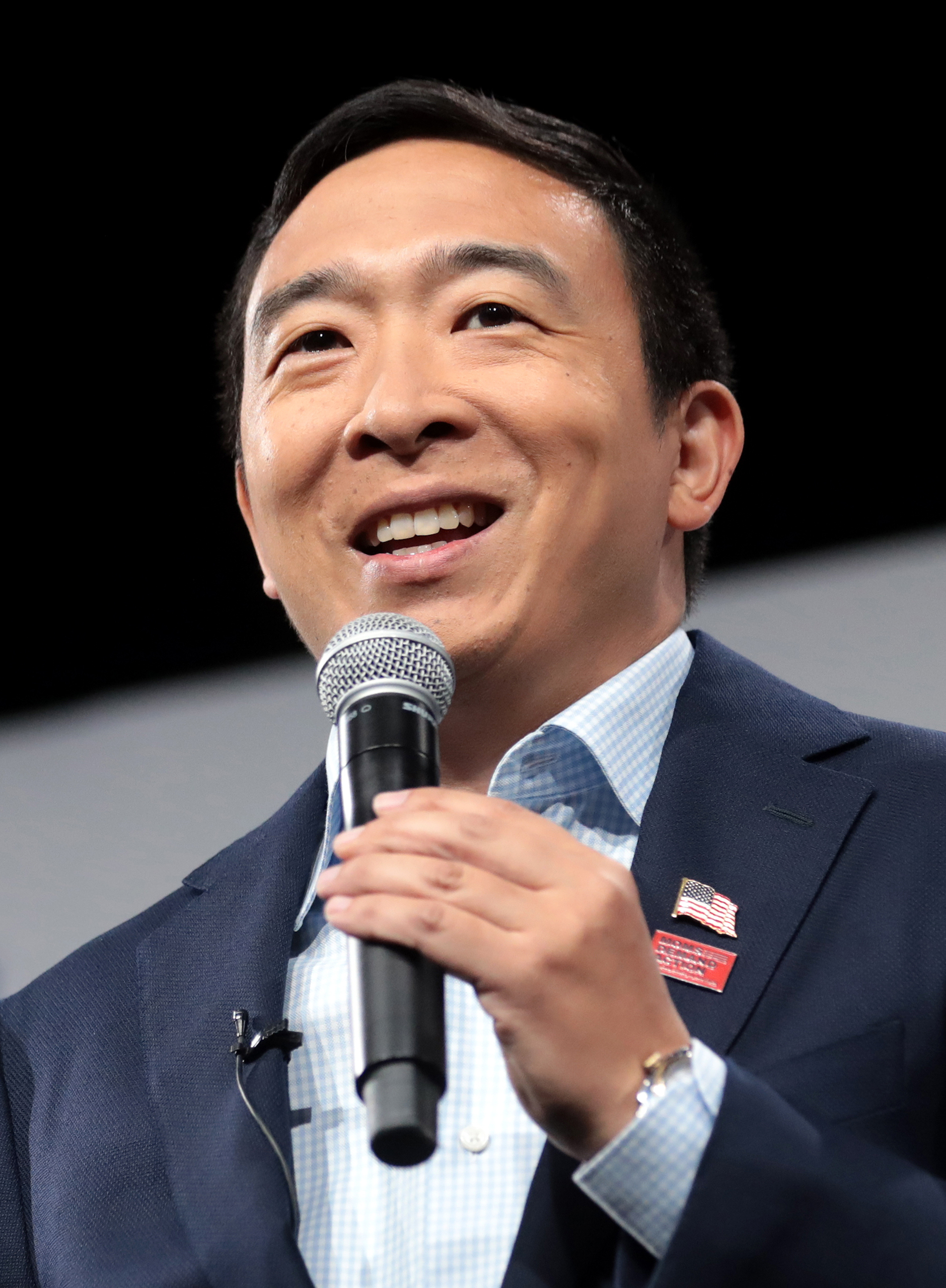
Andrew Yang

- Joyce Aboussie, founder and CEO of Aboussie & Associates and Telephone Contact Inc.
- S. Daniel Abraham, investor, philanthropist and founder of Thompson Medical
- Michael Alter, president and owner of the Alter Group
- Ashok Amritraj, chairman and CEO of the Hyde Park Entertainment Group
- José Andrés, chef and founder of World Central Kitchen
- Mark Arabo, Assyrian-American businessman
- Amy Banse, managing director and head of funds for Comcast Ventures, senior vice president of Comcast, member of the board of directors at Adobe Systems and Clorox
- Robert Bass, Texas billionaire investor
- Arthur Blank, co-founder of The Home Depot
- David Bonderman, billionaire, founding partner of TPG Capital and Newbridge Capital
- Lisa Brummel, co-owner of the Seattle Storm
- Sandy Carter, vice president at Amazon Web Services
- Edwin Catmull, co-founder of Pixar, former president of Walt Disney Animation Studios, computer scientist
- Peter Chernin, chairman and CEO of the Chernin Group
- David L. Cohen, senior executive vice-president and chief lobbyist for Comcast
- Mark Cuban, investor and owner of the Dallas Mavericks (Independent)
- Leslee Dart, founder and co-CEO of 42West
- Michael De Luca, chairman of MGM Studios
- Morgan DeBaun, founder and CEO of Blavity Inc.
- Barry Diller, chairman and senior executive of IAC/InterActiveCorp and Expedia Group, founder of Fox Broadcasting Company and USA Broadcasting
- Jamie Dinan, investor, hedge fund manager, philanthropist
- Kevin Feige, president of Marvel Studios
- Carly Fiorina, chair (2000–2005), president and CEO (1999–2005) of Hewlett-Packard, 2016 candidate for president, California 2010 nominee for Senate (Republican)
- Rob Friedman, media executive
- Nely Galán, former president of entertainment for Telemundo
- Mark Gallogly, managing principal and founder of Centerbridge Partners
- Jim Gianopulos, CEO of Paramount Pictures
- L. Felice Gorordo, entrepreneur and CEO of eMerge Americas
- Julia S. Gouw, former president and COO of East West Bank
- Peter Guber, chairman and CEO of Mandalay Entertainment
- Reed Hastings, co-founder, chairman, and co-chief executive officer (CEO) of Netflix
- John L. Hennessy, computer scientist and chair of Alphabet Inc.
- Mellody Hobson, president and co-CEO of Ariel Investments
- Reid Hoffman, co-founder and former executive chairman of LinkedIn
- Lisa Hook, former president of CEO of Neustar
- Alan F. Horn, co-chairman of Walt Disney Studios
- Bob Iger, executive chairman of The Walt Disney Company
- Laurene Powell Jobs, billionaire heiress, businesswoman, executive and founder of the Emerson Collective
- Jeffrey Katzenberg, co-founder and CEO of DreamWorks Animation and DreamWorks Records, (previously endorsed Steve Bullock)
- Donna Langley, chairwoman of Universal Pictures
- Sherry Lansing, former CEO of Paramount Pictures
- Marc Lasry, billionaire, hedge fund manager, co-founder and CEO of Avenue Capital Group, co-owner of the Milwaukee Bucks
- Keith Leaphart, entrepreneur, philanthropist and physician
- Aileen Lee, founder of Cowboy Ventures
- Kevin Liles, record executive and co-founder and CEO of 300 Entertainment
- Bryan Lourd, partner, managing director and co-chairman of Creative Artists Agency
- Li Lu, founder and chairman of Himalaya Capital
- Daniel Lubetzky, founder and executive chairman of Kind
- Larry Lucchino, former CEO of the Boston Red Sox
- Christina Weiss Lurie, part owner of the Philadelphia Eagles
- Jacqueline Mars, heiress to Mars, Inc and investor
- David Morehouse, CEO and president of the Pittsburgh Penguins
- James Murdoch, former CEO of 21st Century Fox
- Dominic Ng, chairman, president and CEO of East West Bank
- Indra Nooyi, former chairman and CEO of PepsiCo
- Jorge M. Pérez, chairman and CEO of The Related Group, real estate developer, art collector, and philanthropist
- Kathryn Petralia, co-founder and COO of Kabbage
- John Pritzker, billionaire and investor
- M. R. Rangaswami, Indian software executive
- Douglas Rediker, founder and chairman of International Capital Strategies, LLC
- Joyce Rey, luxury real estate agent, head of the Global Luxury division for Coldwell Banker
- Joseph L. Rice III, co-founder of Clayton, Dubilier & Rice
- Katie Rodan, dermatologist, entrepreneur and author
- John W. Rogers Jr., investor, philanthropist founder of Ariel Investments
- Art Rooney II, owner of the Pittsburgh Steelers
- Angelica Ross, businesswoman, founder and CEO of TransTech Social Enterprises
- Tom Rothman, chairman of Sony Pictures Motion Picture Group
- Haim Saban, Israeli-American media proprietor, investor, and producer of records, film, and television
- Howard Schultz, former CEO of Starbucks
- Mark Schuster, dean and CEO of the Kaiser Permanente Bernard J. Tyson School of Medicine
- Jon Shirley, former president, chief operating officer, and director of Microsoft
- David A. Siegel, founder of Westgate Resorts
- Herbert Simon, real estate developer, owner of the Indiana Pacers
- Nat Simons, hedge fund manager, billionaire, philanthropist
- Michael Peter Skelly, renewable energy and infrastructure developer and entrepreneur
- Harry E. Sloan, director of ZeniMax Media
- Brad Smith, president of Microsoft
- Chip Smith, executive vice president of Public Affairs at 21st Century Fox
- Jay T. Snyder, philanthropist
- Jonathan Soros, founder and chief executive officer of JS Capital Management LLC
- Bill Stetson, businessman
- Arn Tellem, vice chairman of the Detroit Pistons
- Jonathan Tisch, chairman emeritus of the United States Travel Association, board member of the Tribeca Film Institute and co-owner of the New York Giants
- Glen Tullman, former CEO of Allscripts
- Jon F. Vein, co-founder and former co-Chief of MarketShare
- Dana Walden, chairman of entertainment at Walt Disney Television
- Tom Werner, chairman of the Boston Red Sox
- Meg Whitman, CEO of Quibi, CEO of Hewlett Packard Enterprise (2011–2018), CEO of eBay (1998–2008), 2010 nominee for governor of California (Republican)
- Zygi Wilf, billionaire, co-owner of the Minnesota Vikings
- Whitney Williams, businesswoman
- Anna Wintour, journalist, editor-in-chief of Vogue
- Anne Wojcicki, co-founder and CEO of 23andMe
- Robert Wolf, chairman and CEO of UBS Americas
- Andrew Yang, Presidential Ambassador for Global Entrepreneurship (2015–17), founder of Venture for America, 2020 candidate for president
- Kneeland Youngblood, co-founder of private equity firm Pharos Capital Group, LLC
- Kinney Zalesne, general manager for corporate strategy at Microsoft
- Peng Zhao, CEO of Citadel LLC
- Jeremy Zimmer, CEO of United Talent Agency

== See also ==
- Endorsements in the 2020 Democratic Party presidential primaries
- News media endorsements in the 2020 United States presidential primaries
- News media endorsements in the 2020 United States presidential election
- List of Donald Trump 2020 presidential campaign political endorsements
- List of Donald Trump 2020 presidential campaign non-political endorsements
- List of former Trump administration officials who endorsed Joe Biden
- List of Jo Jorgensen 2020 presidential campaign endorsements
- List of Howie Hawkins 2020 presidential campaign endorsements
- List of Republicans who opposed the Donald Trump 2020 presidential campaign
- List of Joe Biden 2020 presidential campaign celebrity endorsements
- List of Joe Biden 2024 presidential campaign primary endorsements
