= 2022 United States Senate election in Utah =

- November 8, 2022
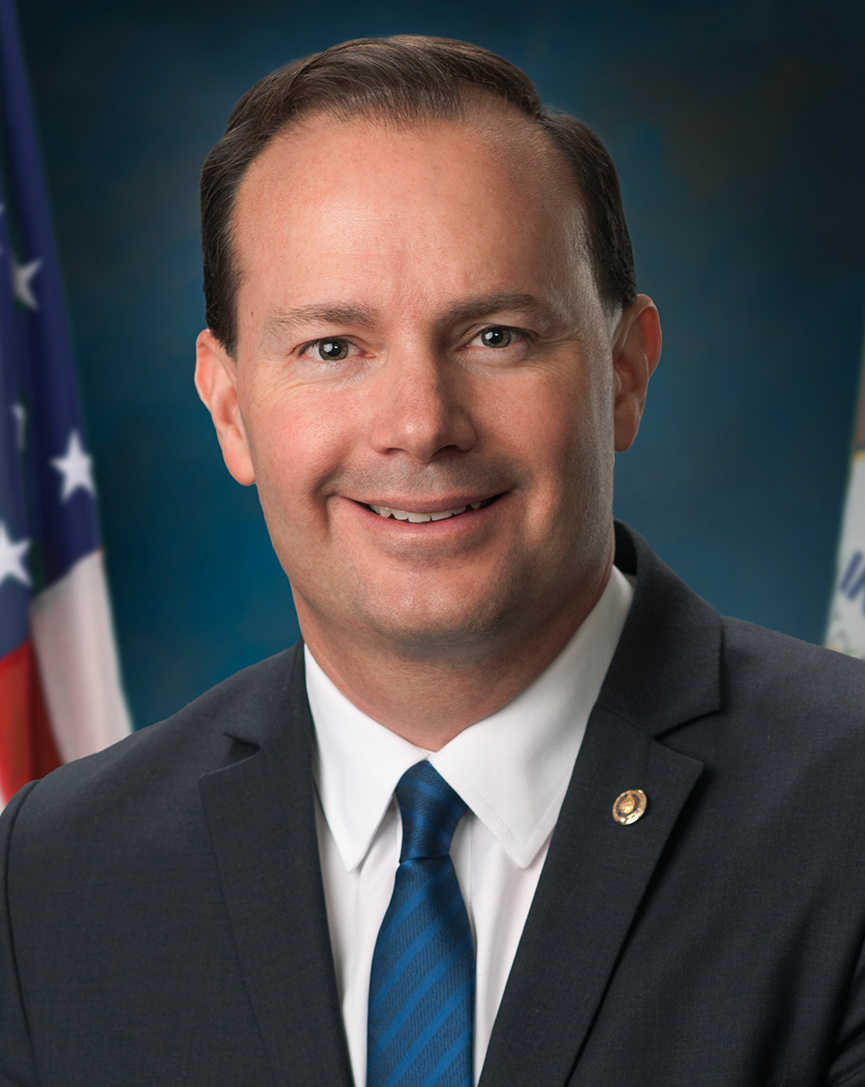

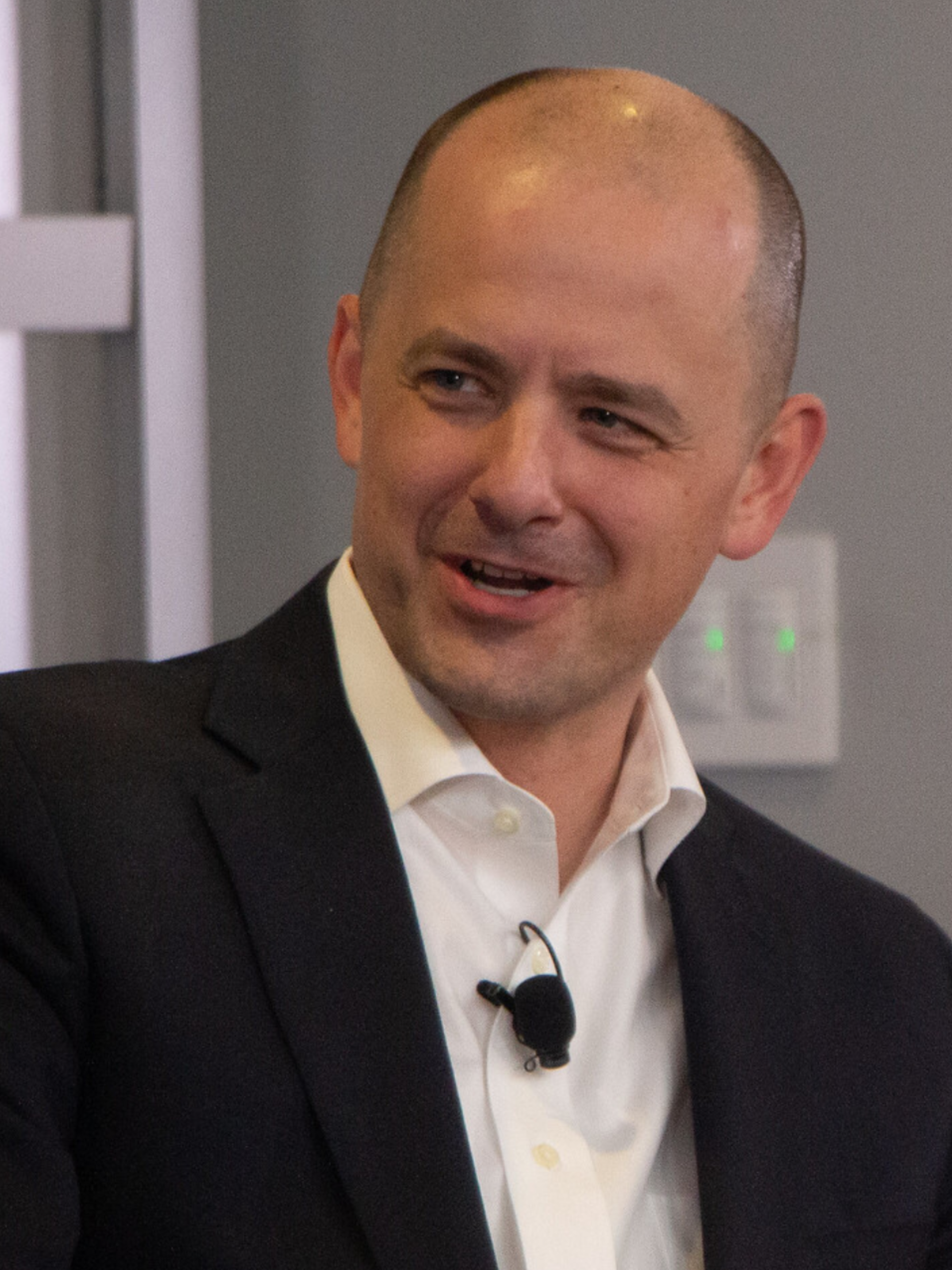
Nominee	Mike Lee	Evan McMullin
Party	Republican	Independent
Alliance		Democratic
Popular vote	571,974	459,958
Percentage	53.15%	42.74%
- Lee: 40–50% 50–60% 60–70% 70–80% 80–90% >90% McMullin: 40–50% 50–60% 60–70% 70–80% >80% Hansen: >90% Williams: >90% Tie: 30–40% 40–50% 50% No votes
U.S. senator before election
Mike Lee
Republican
Elected U.S. senator
Mike Lee
Republican

The 2022 United States Senate election in Utah was held on November 8, 2022, to elect a member of the United States Senate to represent the State of Utah. Incumbent senator Mike Lee, who was first elected in 2010, won re-election to a third term, defeating Evan McMullin, an independent candidate who was endorsed by the Utah Democratic Party.

This was the first Senate election in Utah's history in which there was no Democratic nominee. Lee's performance was the worst for a Republican in a Utah U.S. Senate election since 1974, while McMullin's was the best ever for an independent in a Utah U.S. Senate race and the best for a non-Republican since 1976. This was the first Senate election since 1974 in which Salt Lake County did not vote Republican.

== Republican primary ==
Incumbent U.S. Senator Mike Lee won over 70% of the vote at the Utah Republican Party state convention on April 23, 2022. Though considered by the party to be its nominee, a primary was still held on June 28, 2022, after two other candidates garnered enough signatures to qualify.

=== Candidates ===
==== Nominee ====
- Mike Lee, incumbent U.S. senator (2011–present)

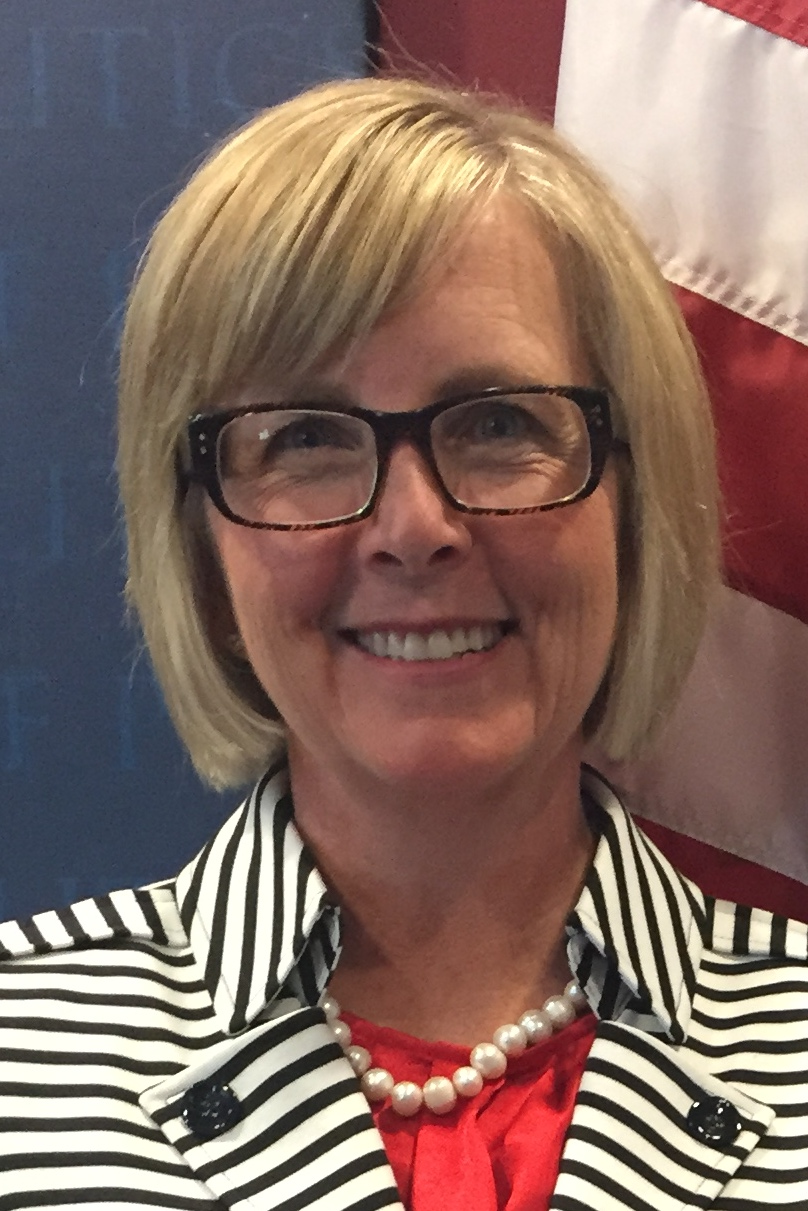
Former state representative Becky Edwards finished second in the primary.

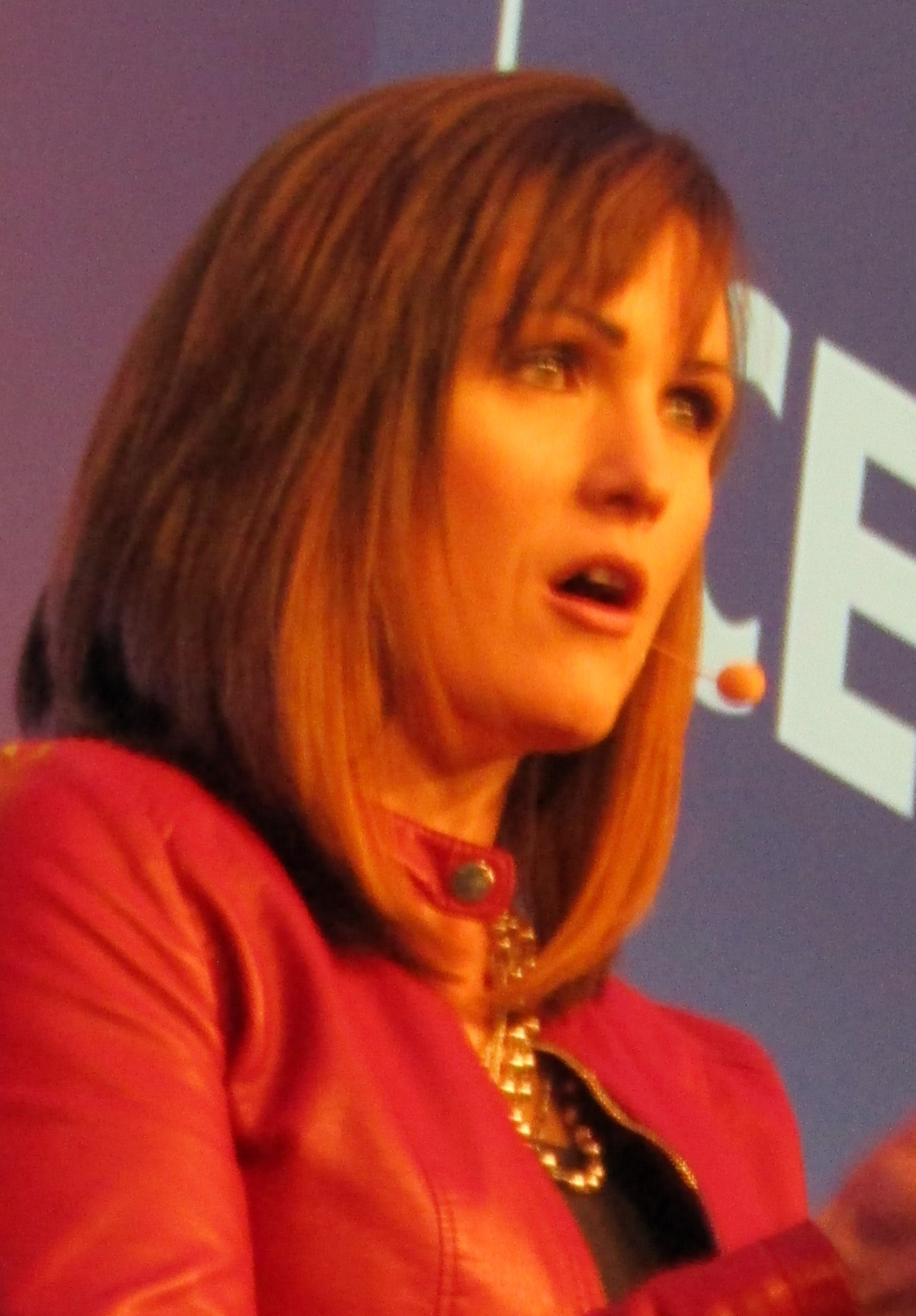
Businesswoman Ally Isom finished third in the primary.

==== Eliminated in primary ====
- Becky Edwards, state representative (2009–2018)
- Ally Isom, business executive, former director of institutional messaging for the Church of Jesus Christ of Latter-day Saints, and former deputy chief of staff and communications director to former Governor Gary Herbert

==== Eliminated at convention ====
- Evan Barlow, assistant professor at Weber State University
- Loy Arlan Brunson, candidate for U.S. Senate in 2012 and 2018
- Jeremy Friedbaum, candidate for U.S. Senate in 2010, 2012 and 2018
- Laird Hamblin, biologist, children's songwriter (running as write-in)

==== Did not file ====
- Benjamin Davis
- Tyrone Jensen, political podcaster, candidate for U.S. Senate in 2018 and Utah's 2nd congressional district in 2020

==== Withdrawn ====
- Brendan Wright, former area planning manager for the Church of Jesus Christ of Latter-day Saints (endorsed Edwards)

==== Declined ====
- Henry Eyring, assistant professor of accounting at London School of Economics and grandson of Henry B. Eyring
- Erin Rider, attorney
- Thomas Wright, real estate broker, chair of the Utah Republican Party (2011–2013) and candidate for governor of Utah in 2020.

=== Endorsements ===
Mike Lee

Executive branch officials

- Donald Trump, 45th president of the United States (2017–2021)

Organizations

- American Conservative Union
- Club for Growth
- Eagle Forum
- FreedomWorks
- Gun Owners of America
- Republican Liberty Caucus
- Turning Point Action
- Utah Republican Party

=== Polling ===
Graphical summary

View source data.

Poll source	Date(s) administered	Sample size (Note: Key: A – all adults RV – registered voters LV – likely voters V – unclear)	Margin of error	Evan Barlow	Loy Brunson	Becky Edwards	Jeremy Friedbaum	Laird Hamblin	Ally Isom	Tyrone Jensen	Mike Lee	Brendan Wright	Other	Undecided
Dan Jones & Associates	May 7–13, 2022	503 (LV)	± 4.3%	–	–	19%	–	–	6%	–	49%	–	–	26%
Dan Jones & Associates	March 9–21, 2022	484 (LV)	± 4.5%	6%	1%	19%	2%	1%	4%	–	67%	–	–	–
OH Predictive Insights	February 7–14, 2022	366 (RV)	± 5.1%	–	–	5%	–	–	2%	2%	51%	2%	–	37%
Dan Jones & Associates	October 14–21, 2021	469 (LV)	± 4.5%	–	–	7%	–	–	2%	–	53%	–	6%	32%
OH Predictive Insights	August 2–8, 2021	337 (RV)	± 5.3%	–	–	3%	–	–	2%	–	45%	3%	–	48%
RMG Research	June 24–25, 2021	587 (LV)	± 4.0%	–	–	11%	–	–	–	–	47%	–	8%	33%

=== Results ===
==== Convention ====
State Republican Convention results, 2022
Candidate	First ballot	Pct.
Mike Lee	2,621	70.74%
Becky Edwards	436	11.77%
Ally Isom	358	9.66%
Jeremy Friedbaum	132	3.56%
Evan Barlow	75	2.02%
Loy Brunson	71	1.92%
Laird Hamblin	12	0.32%
Total	3,705	100.00%

==== Primary ====
Results by county: Lee: 50–60%; 60–70%; 70–80%; 80–90%

Republican primary results
Party	Candidate	Votes	%
Republican	Mike Lee (incumbent)	258,089	61.94%
Republican	Becky Edwards	123,617	29.67%
Republican	Ally Isom	34,997	8.40%
Total votes		416,703	100.0%

== Democratic convention ==
The Utah Democratic Party state convention took place on April 23, 2022. Kael Weston was the only Democrat still running; however, the party endorsed Evan McMullin's independent bid in lieu of nominating a candidate, following encouragement from many prominent Democrats in the state, including former Rep. Ben McAdams and Salt Lake County Mayor Jenny Wilson, to back McMullin's campaign.

=== Candidates ===
==== Eliminated at convention ====
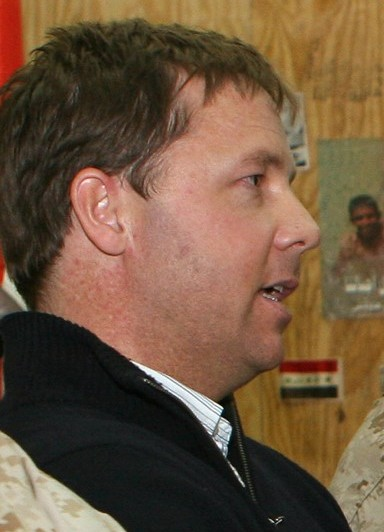
Former U.S. State Department official Kael Weston

- Kael Weston, former U.S. State Department official and nominee for Utah's 2nd congressional district in 2020

==== Did not file ====
- Austin Searle, musician

==== Withdrew ====
- Allen Glines, community activist and writer
- Nicholas Mitchell, scientist and business owner (running for Utah's 2nd congressional district)

==== Declined ====
- Ben McAdams, U.S. representative for Utah's 4th congressional district (2019–2021) (endorsed McMullin)
- Steve Schmidt, political commentator for MSNBC, founder of The Lincoln Project, and former Republican political strategist

=== Endorsements ===
Kael Weston

Statewide official

- Paul Van Dam, attorney general of Utah (1989–1993)

=== Polling ===
Hypothetical polling

Poll source	Date(s) administered	Sample size	Margin of error	Allen Glines	Nicholas Mitchell	Steve Schmidt	Austin Searle	Kael Weston	Undecided
OH Predictive Insights	February 7–14, 2022	110 (RV)	± 9.3%	2%	5%	16%	2%	14%	60%

=== Convention vote ===
The Utah Democratic Party held a state convention on April 23, 2022, to endorse candidates for state offices. Supporters of independent candidate Evan McMullin, led by Salt Lake County Mayor Jenny Wilson, introduced a motion for the state party to forgo nominating a Democratic candidate for the U.S. Senate and to instead "join Evan McMullin's independent coalition to beat Mike Lee", contending that not doing so would split the anti-Lee vote in the general election. The motion was opposed by supporters of Kael Weston, the lone Democratic candidate for the seat who thus would have received the nomination had the motion failed. The delegates passed the motion by a 57–43% margin.

Democratic convention results
Choice	Votes	%
Endorse Evan McMullin	782	56.83
Nominate Kael Weston	594	43.17
Total	1,376	100.00

== Libertarian convention ==
=== Candidates ===
==== Nominee ====
- James Hansen, teacher

==== Eliminated at convention ====
- Lucky Bovo

== Independent American convention ==
=== Candidates ===
==== Declared ====
- Tommy Williams, perennial candidate

== Independents ==
=== Candidates ===
==== Declared ====
- Evan McMullin, political activist, former CIA operations officer, and candidate for president of the United States in 2016 (endorsed by the Democratic Party, United Utah Party, and Forward Party)

==== Withdrawn ====
- Evan Barlow, assistant professor at Weber State University (running as a Republican).

== General election ==
=== Predictions ===
Source	Ranking	As of
The Cook Political Report	Likely R	August 18, 2022
Inside Elections	Likely R	September 9, 2022
Sabato's Crystal Ball	Likely R	June 15, 2022
Politico	Likely R	April 1, 2022
RCP	Likely R	November 5, 2022
Fox News	Likely R	September 20, 2022
DDHQ	Solid R	July 20, 2022
538	Solid R	September 22, 2022
The Economist	Safe R	September 7, 2022

=== Endorsements ===
Mike Lee (R)

U.S. presidents

- Donald Trump, 45th president of the United States (2017–2021)

Executive branch officials

- Nikki Haley, United States ambassador to the United Nations (2017–2018) and governor of South Carolina (2011–2017)
- Jon Huntsman Jr., United States ambassador to Russia (2017–2019) and governor of Utah (2005–2009)
- David M. McIntosh, director of the Domestic Policy Council (1987–1988) and former U.S. representative from IN-02 (1995–2001)
- Robert C. O'Brien, U.S. national security advisor (2019–2021) and special envoy for hostage affairs (2018–2019)
- Mike Pence, 48th vice president of the United States (2017-2021)
- Matt Schlapp, White House director of political affairs (2003–2005)

U.S. senators

- John Barrasso, Wyoming (2007–present)
- Marsha Blackburn, Tennessee (2019–present)
- Roy Blunt, Missouri (2011–2023)
- John Boozman, Arkansas (2011–present)
- Mike Braun, Indiana (2019–2025)
- Richard Burr, North Carolina (2005–2023)
- Shelley Moore Capito, West Virginia (2015–present)
- Bill Cassidy, Louisiana (2015–present)
- Susan Collins, Maine (1997–present)
- John Cornyn, Texas (2002–present)
- Tom Cotton, Arkansas (2015–present)
- Kevin Cramer, North Dakota (2019–present)
- Mike Crapo, Idaho (1999–present)
- Ted Cruz, Texas (2013–present)
- Steve Daines, Montana (2015–present)
- Joni Ernst, Iowa (2015–present)
- Deb Fischer, Nebraska (2013–present)
- Lindsey Graham, South Carolina (2003–2026)
- Chuck Grassley, Iowa (1981–present)
- Bill Hagerty, Tennessee (2021–present)
- Josh Hawley, Missouri (2019–present)
- John Hoeven, North Dakota (2011–present)
- Cindy Hyde-Smith, Mississippi (2018–present)
- Jim Inhofe, Oklahoma (1994–2023)
- Ron Johnson, Wisconsin (2011–present)
- John Kennedy, Louisiana (2017–present)
- James Lankford, Oklahoma (2015–present)
- Cynthia Lummis, Wyoming (2021–present)
- Roger Marshall, Kansas (2021–present)
- Mitch McConnell, Senate minority leader (2021–2025, 2007–2015) and Senate majority leader (2015–2021) from Kentucky (1985–present)
- Jerry Moran, Kansas (2011–present)
- Lisa Murkowski, Alaska (2002–present)
- Rand Paul, Kentucky (2011–present)
- Rob Portman, Ohio (2011–2023)
- Jim Risch, Idaho (2009–present)
- Mike Rounds, South Dakota (2015–present)
- Marco Rubio, Florida (2011–2025)
- Ben Sasse, Nebraska (2015–2023)
- Rick Scott, Florida (2019–present)
- Tim Scott, South Carolina (2013–present)
- Richard Shelby, Alabama (1987–2023)
- Dan Sullivan, Alaska (2015–present)
- John Thune, South Dakota (2005–present)
- Thom Tillis, North Carolina (2015–present)
- Pat Toomey, Pennsylvania (2011–2023)
- Tommy Tuberville, Alabama (2021–present)
- Roger Wicker, Mississippi (2007–present)
- Todd Young, Indiana (2017–present)

U.S. representatives

- Tulsi Gabbard, U.S. representative from Hawaii's 2nd congressional district (2013–2021) and former vice chair of the DNC (Independent)

State officials

- Spencer Cox, governor of Utah (2021–present)
- Ron DeSantis, governor of Florida (2019–present)
- Casey Snider, state representative from the 5th district (2019–present)

Organizations

- American Conservative Union
- American Israel Public Affairs Committee
- Americans for Prosperity
- Campaign for Working Families
- Club for Growth
- Eagle Forum
- FreedomWorks
- Gun Owners of America
- National Federation of Independent Business
- National Rifle Association - Political Victory Fund
- Republican Liberty Caucus
- Susan B. Anthony List
- Tea Party Express
- Turning Point Action
- Utah Republican Party
Evan McMullin (I)

Executive branch officials

- Charles A. Blanchard, former general counsel of the Army (1991–2001) and former general counsel of the Air Force (2009–2013)
- Charles Bolden, former administrator of the National Aeronautics and Space Administration (2009–2017)
- Amy L. Bondurant, U.S. ambassador to the OECD (1997–2001) (Democratic)
- Aurelia E. Brazeal, former U.S. ambassador to Ethiopia (2002–2005), Kenya (1993–1996) and the Federated States of Micronesia (1990–1993)
- Louis Caldera, former director of the White House Military Office (2009) and former U.S. secretary of the Army (1998–2001) (Democratic)
- Patrick G. Carrick, former director of the HSARPA
- Phillip Carter III, former U.S. ambassador to Ivory Coast (2010–2013) and Guinea (2007–2008)
- Judith Beth Cefkin, former U.S. ambassador to Fiji, Kiribati, Nauru, Tonga, and Tuvalu (2015–2018)
- Richard A. Clarke, former assistant secretary of state for political-military affairs (1989–1992)
- Thomas M. Countryman, former acting under secretary of state for international security affairs (2016–2017) and former assistant secretary of state for international security and nonproliferation (2011–2017) (Democratic)
- Cindy Courville, former U.S. ambassador to the African Union (2006–2008)
- Richard Danzig, former U.S. secretary of the Navy (1998–2001) (Democratic)
- Greg Delawie, former U.S. ambassador to Kosovo (2015–2018)
- Gregory W. Engle, former U.S. ambassador to Togo (2003–2005)
- James M. Galloway, former regional health administrator for the U.S. Department of Health and Human Services
- Sherri Goodman, former deputy undersecretary of defense for environmental security (2001–2003)
- Rose Gottemoeller, former deputy secretary general of NATO (2016–2019) and under secretary of state for arms control and international security affairs (2012–2016)
- S. Fitzgerald Haney, former U.S. ambassador to Costa Rica (2015–2017)
- Bruce Heyman, former U.S. ambassador to Canada (2014–2017) (Democratic)
- Janet Napolitano, former U.S. secretary of homeland security (2009–2013) and former governor of Arizona (2003–2009) (Democratic)
- Edward Angus Powell Jr., former president of the United Service Organizations (2002–2009) and former acting U.S. deputy secretary of veterans affairs (2000–2001)
- Charles A. Ray, former U.S. ambassador to Zimbabwe (2009–2012) and Cambodia (2003–2005) and former deputy assistant secretary of defense (2006–2009)
- John C. Rogers, former deputy assistant secretary in the office of Secretary of Defense Les Aspin
- Leslie V. Rowe, former U.S. ambassador to Mozambique (2010–2012), Papua New Guinea (2006–2009), Solomon Islands (2006–2009) and Vanuatu (2006–2009)
- Theodore Sedgwick, former U.S. ambassador to Slovakia (2010–2015)
- Emil Skodon, former U.S. ambassador to Brunei (2005–2008)
- Elizabeth Tamposi, former U.S. assistant secretary of state for consular affairs (1989–1992) and former New Hampshire state representative (1979–1986) (Republican)
- Michelle Thoren Bond, former Assistant Secretary of State for Consular Affairs (2015–2017) and U.S. Ambassador to Lesotho (2010–2012)
- Gregory Treverton, former chair of the U.S. National Intelligence Council (2014–2017) (Democratic)
- Alexander Vershbow, former deputy secretary general of NATO (2012–2016), former assistant ecretary of defense for international security affairs (2009–2012), former U.S. ambassador to South Korea (2005–2008), Russia (2001–2005) and NATO (1997–2001)
- Alexander Vindman, former director for European affairs for the United States National Security Council (2018–2020) and witness during the first impeachment trial of Donald Trump
- James Donald Walsh, former U.S. ambassador to Argentina (2000–2003)
- Jack Watson Jr., former White House chief of staff (1980–1981) (Democratic)
- Sheila Widnall, former U.S. secretary of the Air Force (1993–1997) (Democratic)

U.S. representatives

- William Enyart, U.S. representative from Illinois's 12th congressional district (2013–2015) (Democratic)
- Adam Kinzinger, U.S. representative from Illinois's 16th congressional district (2013–2023 and Illinois's 11th congressional district (2011–2013) (Republican)
- Ben McAdams, U.S. representative from Utah's 4th congressional district (2019–2021) and mayor of Salt Lake County (2013–2019) (Democratic)
- Karen Shepherd, U.S. representative from Utah's 2nd congressional district (1993–1995) (Democratic)
- Joe Walsh, U.S. representative from Illinois's 8th congressional district (2011–2013) (Independent, formerly Republican)

State officials

- Howard Dean, governor of Vermont (1991–2003) and chair of the Democratic National Committee (2005–2009) (Democratic)
- Michael Steele, lieutenant governor of Maryland (2003–2007) and chair of the Republican National Committee (2009–2011) (Republican)

Local officials

- Jenny Wilson, mayor of Salt Lake County (2019–present) and nominee for U.S. Senate in 2018 (Democratic)

Individuals

- Clara Leach Adams-Ender, former chief of the United States Army Nurse Corps (1987–1991)
- William D. Baumgartner, former judge advocate general and former chief counsel of the United States Coast Guard
- Ronald R. Blanck, former surgeon general of the United States Army (1996–2000)
- Jonia Broderick, author and nominee for Utah's 4th congressional district in 2020 (United Utah)
- Donald M. Campbell Jr., former commanding general of United States Army Europe
- Peter Cooke, retired Army Reservist and nominee for governor of Utah in 2012 (Democratic)
- Mark Hamill, actor and writer
- Gale Pollock, former Deputy Surgeon General of the United States Army (2006–2007) and former acting surgeon general of the United States Army (2007)
- Clyde Robbins, retired U.S. Coast Guard vice admiral
- Clayne Robison, singer and professor emeritus of Voice at Southern Virginia University (Republican)
- Ann Tutwiler, former deputy director-general of the United Nations Food and Agriculture Organization (2011–2012)
- Juan Williams, journalist and political analyst for Fox News (Democratic)
- Daniel P. Woodward, former director of regional affairs in the Office of the Deputy Under Secretary of the Air Force for International Affairs
- Andrew Yang, entrepreneur, founder of Venture for America, Democratic candidate for president in 2020 and mayor of New York City in 2021 (Independent, Forward)

Labor unions

- National Education Association
- United Mine Workers
- Utah AFL-CIO

Organizations

- Country First PAC
- League of Conservation Voters
- Renew America Movement

Political parties

- Forward Party
- Reform Party of the United States of America
- United Utah Party
- Utah Democratic Party
- Utah Solidarity Party
Declined to endorse

U.S. senators

- Mitt Romney, U.S. senator from Utah (2019–2025), governor of Massachusetts (2003–2007) and nominee for president in 2012 (Republican)

=== Polling ===
Aggregate polls

Source of poll aggregation	Dates administered	Dates updated	Mike Lee (R)	Evan McMullin (I)	Undecided (Note: Calculated by taking the difference of 100% and all other candidates combined.)	Margin
FiveThirtyEight	June 15 – November 8, 2022	November 8, 2022	48.5%	38.7%	12.8%	Lee +9.8
270towin	October 31 – November 1, 2022	November 8, 2022	48.0%	36.7%	15.3%	Lee +11.3
Average			48.2%	37.7%	14.1%	Lee +10.5

Graphical summary

View source data.

Poll source	Date(s) administered	Sample size	Margin of error	Mike Lee (R)	Evan McMullin (I)	Other	Undecided
Hill Research Consultants (I) (Note: This poll was sponsored by Put Utah First PAC, which supports McMullin)	October 29–30, 2022	500 (LV)	–	47%	46%	–	–
Emerson College	October 25–28, 2022	825 (LV)	± 3.3%	49%	39%	9% (Note: Hansen (L) with 4%; Williams (IA) with 3%; "Someone else" with 2%)	4%
Emerson College	October 25–28, 2022	825 (LV)	± 3.3%	50%	40%	11% (Note: Hansen (L) with 5%; Williams (IA) with 3%; "Someone else" with 3%)	–
OH Predictive Insights	October 25–27, 2022	600 (LV)	± 4.0%	53%	34%	4% (Note: Hansen (L) with 3%; Williams (IA) with 1%)	9%
Hill Research Consultants (I)	October 8–11, 2022	500 (LV)	–	43% (Note: With voters who lean towards a given candidate)	49%	4% (Note: Hansen (L) with 4%)	4%
Hill Research Consultants (I)	October 8–11, 2022	500 (LV)	–	42%	46%	4% (Note: Hansen (L) with 4%)	8%
Kurt Jetta (I) (Note: This poll was sponsored by Center Street PAC, which supports McMullin)	October 4–11, 2022	406 (RV)	± 3.5%	38%	37%	–	26%
Kurt Jetta (I)	October 4–11, 2022	239 (LV)	± 3.5%	50%	38%	–	12%
OH Predictive Insights	October 5–6, 2022	483 (LV)	± 4.5%	47%	32%	5% (Note: Hansen (L) with 3%; Williams (IA) with 2%)	16%
Dan Jones & Associates	October 3–6, 2022	801 (RV)	± 3.5%	41%	37%	8% (Note: Williams (IA) with 2%; Hansen (L) with 1%; "Other" with 5%)	12%
Dan Jones & Associates	October 3–6, 2022	773 (LV)	± 3.5%	42%	37%	8%	12%
Dan Jones & Associates	September 3–21, 2022	815 (RV)	± 3.4%	36%	34%	13% (Note: Williams (IA) with 3%; Hansen (L) with 2%; "Other" with 8%)	16%
Dan Jones & Associates	September 3–21, 2022	786 (LV)	± 3.4%	37%	34%	13%	16%
Lighthouse Research	August 30 – September 13, 2022	509 (LV)	± 4.4%	48%	37%	10% (Note: Hansen (L) and Williams (IA) with 5%)	5%
Kurt Jetta (I)	September 1–8, 2022	474 (RV)	± 3.5%	40%	37%	–	23%
Kurt Jetta (I)	September 1–8, 2022	239 (LV)	± 3.5%	43%	39%	–	18%
Impact Research (I) (Note: This poll was sponsored by McMullin's campaign)	August 29 – September 1, 2022	800 (LV)	± 3.5%	46%	47%	–	7%
WPA Intelligence (R) (Note: This poll was sponsored by Lee's campaign)	August 4–5, 2022	500 (LV)	–	50%	32%	6%	12%
Dan Jones & Associates	July 13–18, 2022	801 (RV)	± 3.5%	41%	36%	14%	8%
WPA Intelligence (R)	July 12–14, 2022	529 (LV)	± 4.3%	49%	35%	10%	5%
Kurt Jetta (I)	July 12, 2022	561 (A)	± 4.1%	43%	32%	–	26%
Kurt Jetta (I)	July 12, 2022	434 (RV)	± 4.7%	44%	34%	–	22%
Kurt Jetta (I)	July 12, 2022	213 (LV)	± 6.7%	50%	36%	–	15%
WPA Intelligence (R)	June 14–16, 2022	300 (LV)	± 5.7%	52%	33%	–	15%
Dan Jones & Associates	May 24 – June 15, 2022	803 (RV)	± 3.5%	41%	35%	4%	20%
Dan Jones & Associates	May 24 – June 4, 2022	810 (RV)	± 3.5%	41%	37%	4%	19%
Kurt Jetta (I)	March 5, 2022	683 (A)	± 3.7%	31%	26%	–	44%
Kurt Jetta (I)	March 5, 2022	– (RV)	–	33%	27%	–	40%
Kurt Jetta (I)	March 5, 2022	– (LV)	–	38%	30%	–	32%

Hypothetical polling

Becky Edwards vs. Evan McMullin

Poll source	Date(s) administered	Sample size	Margin of error	Becky Edwards (R)	Evan McMullin (I)	Other	Undecided
Dan Jones & Associates	May 24 – June 15, 2022	803 (RV)	± 3.5%	31%	29%	7%	34%
Dan Jones & Associates	May 24 – June 4, 2022	810 (RV)	± 3.5%	29%	28%	6%	37%

Ally Isom vs. Evan McMullin

Poll source	Date(s) administered	Sample size	Margin of error	Ally Isom (R)	Evan McMullin (I)	Other	Undecided
Dan Jones & Associates	May 24 – June 15, 2022	803 (RV)	± 3.5%	24%	34%	7%	36%
Dan Jones & Associates	May 24 – June 4, 2022	810 (RV)	± 3.5%	23%	34%	7%	36%

Mike Lee vs. Kael Weston vs. Evan McMullin

Poll source	Date(s) administered	Sample size	Margin of error	Mike Lee (R)	Kael Weston (D)	Evan McMullin (I)	Other	Undecided
Moore Information Group (R)	March 20–24, 2022	400 (LV)	± 5.0%	49%	13%	25%	1%	12%
Dan Jones & Associates	March 9–21, 2022	804 (RV)	± 3.5%	43%	11%	19%	3%	24%
OH Predictive Insights	February 7–14, 2022	739 (RV)	± 3.6%	34%	12%	24%	–	30%

Mike Lee vs. Steve Schmidt vs. Evan McMullin

Poll source	Date(s) administered	Sample size	Margin of error	Mike Lee (R)	Steve Schmidt (D)	Evan McMullin (I)	Undecided
OH Predictive Insights	February 7–14, 2022	739 (RV)	± 3.6%	36%	11%	23%	30%

Mike Lee vs. Steve Schmidt

Poll source	Date(s) administered	Sample size	Margin of error	Mike Lee (R)	Steve Schmidt (D)	Undecided
OH Predictive Insights	February 7–14, 2022	739 (RV)	± 3.6%	45%	25%	30%

Mike Lee vs. Kael Weston

Poll source	Date(s) administered	Sample size	Margin of error	Mike Lee (R)	Kael Weston (D)	Undecided
OH Predictive Insights	February 7–14, 2022	739 (RV)	± 3.6%	45%	25%	30%

=== Debates ===
2022 United States Senate general election in Utah debates
No.	Date	Host	Moderator	Link	Republican	Independent
Key: P Participant A Absent N Non-invitee I Invitee W Withdrawn						
Key: P Participant A Absent N Non-invitee I Invitee W Withdrawn					Mike Lee	Evan McMullin
1	Oct. 18, 2022	Utah Debate Commission	Doug Wright		P	P

=== Results ===
2022 United States Senate election in Utah
Party	Candidate	Votes	%	±%
Republican	Mike Lee (incumbent)	571,974	53.15%	–15.00
Independent	Evan McMullin	459,958	42.74%	N/A
Libertarian	James Hansen	31,784	2.95%	N/A
Independent American	Tommy Williams	12,103	1.12%	–1.33
Write-in		242	0.02%	N/A
Total votes		1,076,061	100.0%	
Republican hold				

==== By county ====
County	Mike Lee Republican		Evan McMullin Independent		James Hansen Libertarian		Tommy Williams Ind. American		Write-in		Margin		Total votes
County	#	%	#	%	#	%	#	%	#	%	#	%	Total votes
Beaver	1,971	80.55	419	17.12	33	1.35	24	0.98	0	0.00	1,552	63.42	2,447
Box Elder	14,434	72.52	4,725	23.74	463	2.33	276	1.39	5	0.02	9,709	48.78	19,903
Cache	24,588	58.56	15,580	37.10	1,228	2.92	586	1.40	8	0.02	9,008	21.45	41,990
Carbon	4,265	63.38	2,114	31.42	230	3.42	119	1.77	1	0.01	2,151	31.97	6,729
Daggett	377	75.70	109	21.89	4	0.80	8	1.61	0	0.00	268	53.81	498
Davis	66,385	53.63	52,806	42.66	2,897	2.34	1,654	1.34	36	0.03	13,579	10.97	123,778
Duchesne	5,170	82.28	912	14.52	96	1.53	103	1.64	2	0.03	4,258	67.77	6,283
Emery	3,269	79.60	712	17.34	70	1.70	56	1.36	0	0.00	2,557	62.26	4,107
Garfield	1,795	75.26	520	21.80	33	1.38	37	1.55	0	0.00	1,275	53.46	2,385
Grand	1,901	40.94	2,421	52.14	250	5.38	71	1.53	0	0.00	−520	−11.20	4,643
Iron	12,923	74.66	3,755	21.69	437	2.52	194	1.12	0	0.00	9,168	52.97	17,309
Juab	3,886	82.14	714	15.09	70	1.48	61	1.29	0	0.00	3,172	67.05	4,731
Kane	2,553	69.77	946	25.85	104	2.84	56	1.53	0	0.00	1,607	43.92	3,659
Millard	4,279	83.41	701	13.66	88	1.72	62	1.21	0	0.00	3,578	69.75	5,130
Morgan	3,665	71.07	1,358	26.33	79	1.53	55	1.07	0	0.00	2,307	44.74	5,157
Piute	692	88.38	82	10.47	6	0.77	3	0.38	0	0.00	610	77.91	783
Rich	844	78.66	206	19.20	14	1.30	9	0.84	0	0.00	638	59.46	1,073
Salt Lake	144,931	38.02	218,495	57.32	13,902	3.65	3,780	0.99	87	0.02	−73,564	−19.30	381,195
San Juan	3,118	56.06	1,815	32.63	338	6.08	289	5.20	2	0.04	1,303	23.43	5,562
Sanpete	7,829	78.26	1,912	19.11	150	1.50	113	1.13	0	0.00	5,917	59.15	10,004
Sevier	6,411	82.46	1,152	14.82	120	1.54	92	1.18	0	0.00	5,259	67.64	7,775
Summit	7,305	35.88	12,325	60.54	553	2.72	171	0.84	4	0.02	−5,020	−24.66	20,358
Tooele	13,371	60.57	7,487	33.92	809	3.66	402	1.82	5	0.02	5,884	26.65	22,074
Uintah	8,905	82.19	1,559	14.39	203	1.87	166	1.53	1	0.01	7,346	67.80	10,834
Utah	127,096	61.67	72,238	35.05	4,949	2.40	1,762	0.85	55	0.03	54,858	26.62	206,100
Wasatch	7,528	55.91	5,429	40.32	350	2.60	157	1.17	0	0.00	2,099	15.59	13,464
Washington	49,420	71.11	17,786	25.59	1,526	2.20	769	1.11	0	0.00	31,634	45.52	69,501
Wayne	1,056	69.75	415	27.41	26	1.72	17	1.12	0	0.00	641	42.34	1,514
Weber	42,007	54.50	31,265	40.56	2,756	3.58	1,011	1.31	36	0.05	10,742	13.94	77,075
Totals	571,974	53.15	459,958	42.74	31,784	2.95	12,103	1.12	242	0.02	112,016	10.41	1,076,061

Counties that flipped from Republican to Independent

- Grand (largest municipality: Moab)
- Salt Lake (largest municipality: Salt Lake City)

Counties that flipped from Democratic to Independent

- Summit (largest municipality: Park City)

==== By congressional district ====
Lee won all four congressional districts.

District	Lee	McMullin	Representative
1st	51%	44%	Blake Moore
2nd	53%	42%	Chris Stewart
3rd	52%	44%	John Curtis
4th	56%	40%	Burgess Owens

== See also ==
- 2022 United States Senate elections

== Notes ==
Partisan clients
