= 2022 United States Senate election in Florida =

- November 8, 2022
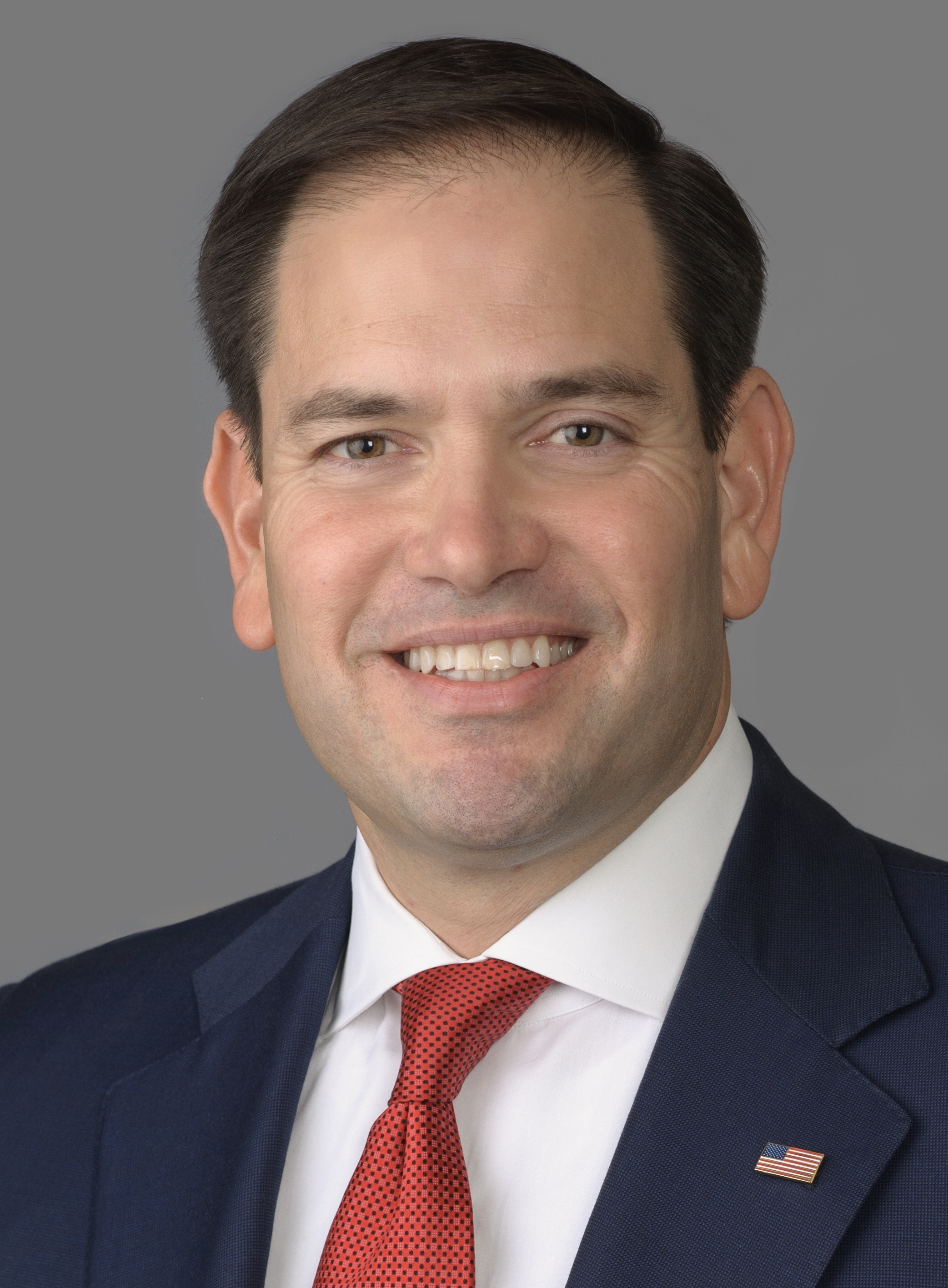

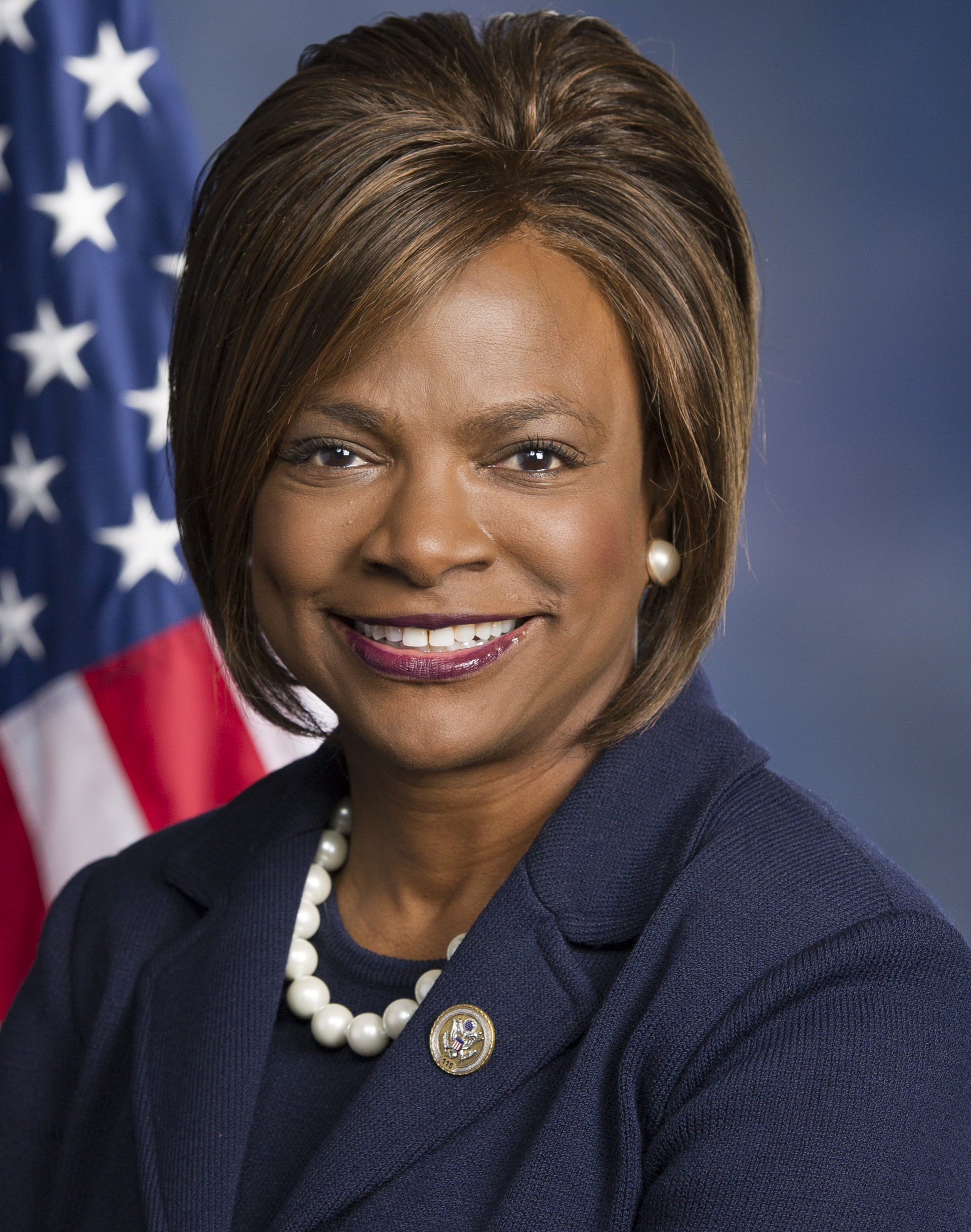
Nominee	Marco Rubio	Val Demings
Party	Republican	Democratic
Popular vote	4,474,847	3,201,522
Percentage	57.68%	41.27%
- Rubio: 40–50% 50–60% 60–70% 70–80% 80–90% >90% Demings: 40–50% 50–60% 60–70% 70–80% 80–90% >90% Tie: 40–50% 50% No votes
U.S. senator before election
Marco Rubio
Republican
Elected U.S. senator
Marco Rubio
Republican

The 2022 United States Senate election in Florida was held on November 8, 2022, to elect a member of the United States Senate to represent the state of Florida. Incumbent Republican Senator Marco Rubio won re-election to a third term, defeating Democratic nominee Val Demings in a landslide victory. Rubio was first elected in 2010, filling the seat of appointed Senator George LeMieux. Rubio won re-election to a third term, becoming the first Republican to do so in Florida history. Rubio was sworn in for what would be his last term in the Senate, serving from January 3, 2023, to January 21, 2025, when he assumed the office of United States Secretary of State in the second Trump administration.

The primary elections for Republicans and Democrats took place on August 23 to finalize candidates for the November election. Rubio won the uncontested Republican primary, while incumbent U.S. Representative Val Demings won the Democratic nomination.

Despite some predicting a close race early, Rubio went on to win by a comfortable 16.4%, improving upon his 2016 performance by 8.7%. According to exit polls, Rubio won 64% of White voters, 56% of Latino voters, and 9% of African American voters (down from 17% from 2016). Demings' 41.27% share of the vote was the worst performance for a Democrat in a Senate race in Florida since 1994. Despite this, she was still the best performing statewide Democrat in the 2022 Florida election cycle.

== Republican primary ==
=== Candidates ===
==== Nominee ====
- Marco Rubio, incumbent U.S. senator

==== Did not qualify ====
- Kevin DePuy, former Marine Corps sergeant
- Howard Knepper, businessman and perennial candidate (ran as a write-in candidate)
- Jake Loubriel, Florida National Guardsman
- Ervan Katari Miller, perennial candidate
- Earl Yearicks IV, maritime captain

==== Withdrawn ====
- Calvin Driggers, businessman
- Luis Miguel, conservative writer and activist (ran for State House)
- Angela Walls-Windhauser, perennial candidate

==== Declined ====
- Pam Bondi, former Florida attorney general
- Matt Gaetz, former U.S. representative (ran for re-election)
- Brian Mast, U.S. representative (ran for re-election)
- Roger Stone, political consultant
- Donald Trump, former president of the United States (endorsed Rubio)
- Ivanka Trump, former advisor to the president
- Michael Waltz, former U.S. representative (ran for re-election)

=== Endorsements ===
Marco Rubio

U.S. presidents

- Donald Trump, 45th president of the United States (2017–2021)

Sheriffs

- 55 county sheriffs

Organizations

- Associated Industries of Florida
- Florida Fraternal Order of Police
- Pro-Israel America
- Republican Jewish Coalition
- Tea Party Express

Labor unions

- Florida Police Benevolent Association

== Democratic primary ==
=== Candidates ===
==== Nominee ====
- Val Demings, U.S. representative

==== Eliminated in primary ====
- Ricardo de la Fuente, perennial candidate and son of Rocky de la Fuente
- Brian Rush, former Minority Whip of the Florida House of Representatives
- William Sanchez, immigration lawyer and former special counsel for the U.S. Department of Justice

==== Did not qualify ====
- Edward Abud, businessman
- Al Fox, president of the Alliance for Responsible Cuba Policy Foundation
- Dana Harshman, pharmacist
- Josue Larose, perennial candidate
- Coleman Watson, federal attorney and stroke survivor
- Joshua Weil, teacher

==== Withdrawn ====
- Allen Ellison, policy consultant and nominee for Florida's 17th congressional district in 2018 and 2020 (ran for U.S. House)
- Alan Grayson, former U.S. representative and candidate in 2016 (ran for U.S. House)
- Ilya Katz, Loyola University Chicago professor
- Allek Pastrana, engineer (ran for U.S. House)
- Ken Russell, former Miami City Commissioner (ran for U.S. House)

==== Declined ====
- Aramis Ayala, former state attorney for the Ninth Judicial Circuit Court of Florida (2017–2021) (ran for attorney general)
- Charlie Crist, former U.S. representative, former governor of Florida, candidate for U.S. Senate in 2010, and nominee for governor in 2014 (ran for governor)
- Ted Deutch, former U.S. representative
- Anna Eskamani, state representative
- Nikki Fried, former Florida commissioner of agriculture (ran for governor)
- Gwen Graham, former Assistant Secretary of Education for Legislation and Congressional Affairs, former U.S. representative, and candidate for governor in 2018
- Debbie Mucarsel-Powell, former U.S. representative
- Stephanie Murphy, former U.S. representative

=== Endorsements ===
Val Demings

U.S. senators

- Kirsten Gillibrand, U.S. senator from New York (2009–present)

U.S. representatives

- Kathy Castor, U.S. representative from Florida's 14th congressional district (2007–present)
- Luis Gutiérrez, former U.S. representative from Illinois's 4th congressional district (1993–2019)

State officials

- Alex Sink, former chief financial officer of Florida (2007–2011)

Organizations

- Congressional Black Caucus PAC
- Democratic Majority for Israel
- EMILY's List
- End Citizens United
- Feminist Majority PAC
- Giffords
- Human Rights Campaign
- Jewish Democratic Council of America
- League of Conservation Voters
- March On
- Population Connection Action Fund

Labor unions

- 1199SEIU United Healthcare Workers East
- AFSCME Florida
- Communications Workers of America
- Service Employees International Union Florida

Newspapers

- The Palm Beach Post
- Tampa Bay Times
Alan Grayson (withdrawn)

Individuals

- Marianne Williamson, author and candidate for president of the United States in 2020
Joshua Weil (failed to qualify)

Organizations

- American Youth for Climate Action
- Progressives for Democracy in America - Florida

=== Polling ===
Poll source	Date(s) administered	Sample size (Note: Key: A – all adults RV – registered voters LV – likely voters V – unclear)	Margin of error	Ricardo De La Fuente	Val Demings	Brian Rush	William Sanchez	Undecided
University of North Florida	August 8–12, 2022	529 (LV)	± 6.0%	2%	80%	4%	4%	10%

=== Results ===
Results by county: Demings: 30–40%; 40–50%; 50–60%; 60–70%; 70–80%; 80–90%; >90%; Rush: 30–40%; 40–50%

Democratic primary results
Party	Candidate	Votes	%
Democratic	Val Demings	1,263,706	84.3
Democratic	Brian Rush	94,185	6.3
Democratic	William Sanchez	84,576	5.6
Democratic	Ricardo De La Fuente	56,749	3.8
Total votes		1,499,216	100.0

== Independent and third-party candidates ==
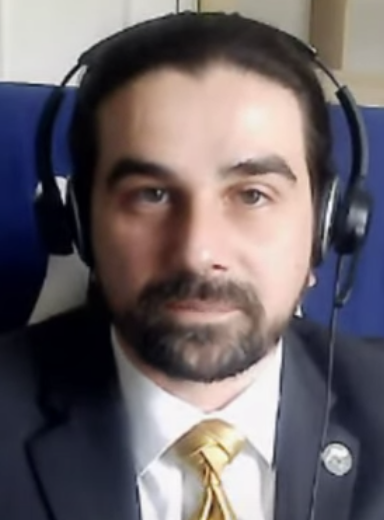
Former Black Point supervisor Dennis Misigoy was the Libertarian nominee.

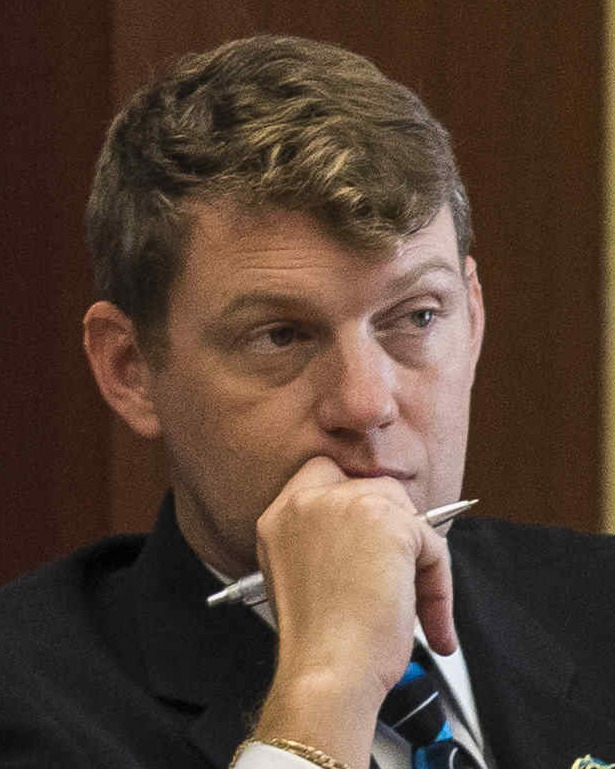
Former Boynton Beach mayor Steven B. Grant ran as an Independent.

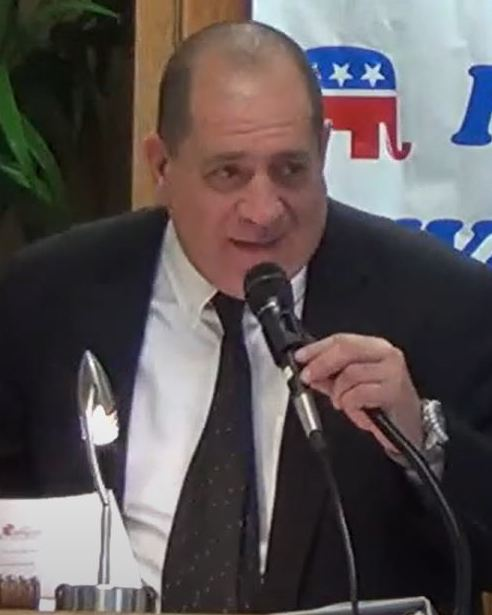
Businessman Howard Knepper ran a write-in campaign.

=== Libertarian Party ===
==== Candidates ====
===== Qualified =====
- Dennis Misigoy, former chairman of the Enclave at Black Point Community Development District board of supervisors (2016–2021)

=== Unity Party ===
==== Candidates ====
===== Did not file =====
- Shantele Bennett, financial advisor and candidate for mayor of Orlando in 2019

=== Independent candidates ===
==== Candidates ====
===== Declared =====
- Steven B. Grant, former mayor of Boynton Beach (2016–2022)
- Quoc Tuan Nguyen, Florida Institute of Technology professor

===== Did not qualify =====
- Carlos Barberena, digital marketing consultant

===== Did not file =====
- Grace Granda, business consultant

===== Withdraw =====
- Jason Holic, businessman

===== Declined =====
- David Jolly, chairman of Serve America Movement and former U.S. representative
- John Morgan, attorney and medical marijuana advocate
- Joe Scarborough, MSNBC host and former U.S. representative

=== Write-ins ===
==== Candidates ====
===== Declared =====
- Jay An
- Uloma Uma Expete
- Edward Gray
- Salomon Hernandez Sr.
- Howard Knepper, businessman and perennial candidate
- Moses Quiles, security technician

== General election ==
=== Predictions ===
Source	Ranking	As of
The Cook Political Report	Likely R	October 18, 2022
Inside Elections	Likely R	August 25, 2022
Sabato's Crystal Ball	Likely R	August 24, 2022
Politico	Likely R	November 3, 2022
RCP	Lean R	February 24, 2022
Fox News	Lean R	May 12, 2022
DDHQ	Likely R	July 20, 2022
538	Solid R	November 4, 2022
The Economist	Likely R	September 7, 2022

=== Endorsements ===
Marco Rubio (R)

U.S. presidents

- Donald Trump, 45th president of the United States (2017–2021)

U.S. senators

- Rick Scott, U.S. senator from Florida (2019–present)

U.S. representatives

- Vern Buchanan, U.S. representative from Florida's 16th congressional district (2013–present)
- Greg Steube, U.S. representative from Florida's 17th congressional district (2019–present)

State officials

- Ron DeSantis, governor of Florida (2019–present)

Sheriffs

- 55 county sheriffs

Organizations

- American Israel Public Affairs Committee
- American Seniors Association
- Armenian National Committee of America
- Associated Industries of Florida
- Campaign for Working Families
- Citizens Against Government Waste
- Florida Family Action
- Florida Police Chiefs Association
- GOPAC Election Fund
- National Federation of Independent Business – Florida
- National Right to Life Committee
- Pro-Israel America
- Republican Jewish Coalition
- Susan B. Anthony List
- Tea Party Express

Labor unions

- Florida Fraternal Order of Police
- Florida Police Benevolent Association
- International Union of Police Associations
- National Association of Police Organizations
Val Demings (D)

U.S. presidents

- Joe Biden, 46th president of the United States (2021–2025)

U.S. senators

- Kirsten Gillibrand, U.S. senator from New York (2009–present)
- Chris Murphy, U.S. senator from Connecticut (2013–present)

U.S. representatives

- Kathy Castor, U.S. representative from Florida's 14th congressional district (2007–present)
- Charlie Crist, former U.S. representative from Florida's 13th congressional district (2017–2022) and 44th governor of Florida (2007–2011)
- Luis Gutiérrez, former U.S. representative from Illinois's 4th congressional district (1993–2019)

State officials

- Nikki Fried, former Florida Commissioner of Agriculture (2019–2023)
- Alex Sink, former chief financial officer of Florida (2007–2011)

Local officials

- Jane Castor, mayor of Tampa (2019–present)

Individuals

- Jill Biden, First Lady of the United States
- Jenifer Lewis, actress
- Oprah Winfrey, businesswoman and talk show host

Organizations

- Congressional Black Caucus PAC
- Democratic Majority for Israel
- EMILY's List
- Feminist Majority PAC
- Giffords
- Human Rights Campaign
- Jewish Democratic Council of America
- League of Conservation Voters
- March On
- Population Connection Action Fund

Labor unions

- 1199SEIU United Healthcare Workers East
- AFSCME Florida
- Communications Workers of America
- National Education Association
- Service Employees International Union Florida

Newspapers

- Miami Herald
- Orlando Weekly
- The Palm Beach Post
- Tampa Bay Times

=== Polling ===
Aggregate polls

Source of poll aggregation	Dates administered	Dates updated	Marco Rubio (R)	Val Demings (D)	Undecided (Note: Calculated by taking the difference of 100% and all other candidates combined.)	Margin
Real Clear Politics	October 17, 2022 – November 6, 2022	November 8, 2022	52.4%	43.6%	4.0%	Rubio +8.8
FiveThirtyEight	September 18, 2022 – November 4, 2022	November 8, 2022	52.3%	43.5%	4.2%	Rubio +8.8
270towin	November 4–7, 2022	November 8, 2022	51.6%	42.4%	6.0%	Rubio +9.2
Average			52.1%	43.2%	4.7%	Rubio +8.9

Graphical summary

Poll source	Date(s) administered	Sample size	Margin of error	Marco Rubio (R)	Val Demings (D)	Other	Undecided
Research Co.	November 4–6, 2022	450 (LV)	± 4.6%	52%	42%	2% (Note: "Some other candidate" with 2%)	4%
Data for Progress (D)	November 2–6, 2022	1,436 (LV)	± 3.0%	55%	43%	2% (Note: Misigoy (L) with 1%; "Another candidate" with 1%)	–
Amber Integrated (R)	November 1–2, 2022	600 (LV)	± 4.0%	49%	40%	4% (Note: Misigoy (L) with 3%; "Other" with 1%)	7%
Civiqs	October 29 – November 2, 2022	772 (LV)	± 3.9%	52%	45%	2% (Note: "Someone else" with 2%)	1%
InsiderAdvantage (R)	November 1, 2022	550 (LV)	± 4.2%	51%	45%	1% (Note: "Another candidate" with 1%)	3%
Siena College	October 30 – November 1, 2022	659 (LV)	± 4.4%	51%	43%	2% (Note: "Not going to vote" with 2%)	4%
Victory Insights	October 30 – November 1, 2022	500 (LV)	± 4.8%	50%	46%	–	5%
Florida State University/YouGov	October 20–31, 2022	1,117 (RV)	–	51%	44%	–	–
University of North Florida	October 17–24, 2022	622 (LV)	± 4.7%	54%	43%	<1% (Note: "Refused" with <1%)	3%
Data for Progress (D)	October 19–23, 2022	1,251 (LV)	± 3.0%	51%	44%	2% (Note: Misigoy (L) with 1%; "Another candidate" with 1%)	2%
Florida Atlantic University	October 12–16, 2022	719 (LV)	± 3.7%	48%	42%	3% (Note: "Someone else" with 3%)	7%
RMG Research (R) (Note: Poll conducted for Tripp Scott, a law firm associated with the Florida Republican Party.)	October 10–13, 2022	685 (LV)	± 3.7%	50%	45%	–	5%
Mason-Dixon Polling & Strategy	September 26–28, 2022	800 (LV)	± 3.5%	47%	41%	2%	10%
Siena College	September 18–25, 2022	669 (LV)	± 4.5%	48%	41%	2% (Note: "Not going to vote" with 2%)	9%
Civiqs	September 17–20, 2022	617 (LV)	± 4.5%	49%	47%	3% (Note: "Someone else" with 3%)	2%
Suffolk University	September 15–18, 2022	500 (LV)	± 4.4%	45%	41%	4% (Note: Misigoy (L) with 1%; Grant (I) with 1%; Nguyen (I) with 1%; "Refused" with 1%)	9%
Sachs Media	September 10, 2022	600 (LV)	–	49%	46%	–	5%
Kurt Jetta (D) (Note: This poll was sponsored by Center Street PAC, which opposes Rubio.)	September 9–10, 2022	999 (RV)	± 3.0%	48%	40%	–	12%
Kurt Jetta (D)	September 9–10, 2022	563 (LV)	± 3.0%	50%	45%	–	5%
Echelon Insights	August 31 – September 7, 2022	815 (RV)	± 4.3%	50%	41%	–	9%
InsiderAdvantage (R)	September 5–6, 2022	550 (LV)	± 4.2%	46%	44%	–	10%
Susquehanna Polling and Research (R)	August 29 – September 4, 2022	500 (LV)	± 4.3%	47%	44%	–	9%
Fabrizio Ward (R)/Impact Research (D)	August 24–31, 2022	500 (LV)	± 4.4%	49%	47%	–	4%
Clarity Campaign Labs (D) (Note: This poll was sponsored by Progress Florida and Florida Watch.)	August 25–30, 2022	3,017 (LV)	± 1.8%	46%	45%	–	9%
Impact Research (D) (Note: This poll was sponsored by the Democratic Governors Association.)	August 12–18, 2022	800 (LV)	± 3.5%	49%	46%	–	5%
Kurt Jetta (D)	August 12–14, 2022	996 (RV)	± 3.1%	46%	39%	–	14%
Kurt Jetta (D)	August 12–14, 2022	610 (LV)	± 4.0%	52%	41%	–	7%
University of North Florida	August 8–12, 2022	1,624 (RV)	± 3.4%	44%	48%	7%	2%
Change Research (D) (Note: This poll was sponsored by EMILY's List.)	August 2–5, 2022	1,031 (LV)	± 3.1%	46%	46%	–	7%
Clarity Campaign Labs (D)	July 26–31, 2022	2,244 (LV)	± 2.1%	45%	45%	–	10%
Kurt Jetta (D)	July 9, 2022	906 (A)	± 3.3%	46%	38%	–	16%
Kurt Jetta (D)	July 9, 2022	732 (RV)	± 3.6%	45%	40%	–	16%
Kurt Jetta (D)	July 9, 2022	428 (LV)	± 4.7%	50%	42%	–	8%
Public Policy Polling (D) (Note: This poll was sponsored by Giffords, which supports Demings.)	May 26–27, 2022	655 (V)	± 3.8%	47%	41%	–	12%
Phillips Academy	May 7–9, 2022	543 (RV)	± 4.2%	34%	36%	–	30%
Moore Information Group (R)	March 14–19, 2022	600 (LV)	± 4.0%	47%	32%	8% (Note: Barberena with 5%, "None" with 3%)	12%
Saint Leo University	February 28 – March 12, 2022	500 (LV)	± 4.5%	45%	27%	–	28%
Kurt Jetta (D)	March 4, 2022	1,098 (A)	± 3.0%	45%	26%	–	29%
Kurt Jetta (D)	March 4, 2022	893 (RV)	± 3.3%	45%	27%	–	28%
Kurt Jetta (D)	March 4, 2022	446 (LV)	± 4.6%	49%	35%	–	16%
University of North Florida	February 7–20, 2022	685 (RV)	± 3.7%	46%	34%	–	20%
Mason-Dixon Polling & Strategy	February 7–10, 2022	625 (RV)	± 4.0%	49%	42%	–	9%
Suffolk University	January 26–29, 2022	500 (LV)	± 4.4%	49%	41%	0%	10%
St. Pete Polls	November 18–19, 2021	2,896 (LV)	± 1.8%	51%	44%	–	5%
Redfield & Wilton Strategies	November 9, 2021	867 (RV)	± 3.3%	45%	33%	3%	12%
Redfield & Wilton Strategies	November 9, 2021	842 (LV)	± 3.4%	48%	36%	3%	10%
Saint Leo University	October 17–23, 2021	500 (A)	± 4.5%	47%	29%	–	25%
VCreek/AMG (R) (Note: This poll was sponsored by Americas PAC.)	September 23–27, 2021	405 (LV)	± 4.9%	42%	38%	5%	15%
Redfield & Wilton Strategies	August 20–24, 2021	1,000 (RV)	± 3.1%	46%	34%	3%	11%
Redfield & Wilton Strategies	August 20–24, 2021	977 (LV)	± 3.1%	48%	37%	3%	10%
Political Matrix/Listener Group (R)	August 14–18, 2021	1,000 (LV)	± 3.1%	55%	45%	–	–
St. Pete Polls	August 16–17, 2021	2,068 (RV)	± 2.2%	48%	46%	–	6%
Change Research (D) (Note: This poll was sponsored by Future Majority.)	August 14–17, 2021	1,585 (LV)	± 2.5%	47%	44%	–	9%
Susquehanna Polling & Research (R)	August 4–10, 2021	700 (RV)	± 3.7%	50%	39%	1%	9%
Political Matrix/Listener Group (R)	June 27, 2021	681 (LV)	± 3.9%	60%	40%	–	–

Hypothetical polling

Marco Rubio vs. Aramis Ayala

Poll source	Date(s) administered	Sample size	Margin of error	Marco Rubio (R)	Aramis Ayala (D)	Undecided
Cherry Communications (R)	April 30 – May 8, 2021	602 (LV)	± 4.0%	52%	39%	–

Marco Rubio vs. Alan Grayson

Poll source	Date(s) administered	Sample size	Margin of error	Marco Rubio (R)	Alan Grayson (D)	Other	Undecided
Redfield & Wilton Strategies	November 9, 2021	867 (RV)	± 3.3%	43%	34%	4%	12%
Redfield & Wilton Strategies	November 9, 2021	842 (LV)	± 3.4%	46%	37%	4%	10%
VCreek/AMG (R)	September 23–27, 2021	405 (LV)	± 4.9%	44%	32%	10%	14%
Redfield & Wilton Strategies	August 20–24, 2021	1,000 (RV)	± 3.1%	46%	33%	4%	12%
Redfield & Wilton Strategies	August 20–24, 2021	977 (LV)	± 3.1%	48%	36%	4%	11%

Marco Rubio vs. Stephanie Murphy

Poll source	Date(s) administered	Sample size	Margin of error	Marco Rubio (R)	Stephanie Murphy (D)	Undecided
Cherry Communications (R)	April 30 – May 8, 2021	602 (LV)	± 4.0%	51%	41%	–

Marco Rubio vs. generic Democrat

Poll source	Date(s) administered	Sample size	Margin of error	Marco Rubio (R)	Generic Democrat	Undecided
Mason-Dixon	February 24–28, 2021	625 (RV)	± 4.0%	46%	40%	14%
Data for Progress (D) (Note: Poll sponsored by the Defend Students Action Fund)	September 15–22, 2020	620 (LV)	± 3.9%	42%	43%	15%

=== Debates ===
2022 United States Senate general election in Florida debates
No.	Date	Host	Moderator	Link	Republican	Democratic
Key: P Participant A Absent N Non-invitee I Invitee W Withdrawn						
Key: P Participant A Absent N Non-invitee I Invitee W Withdrawn					Marco Rubio	Val Demings
1	Oct. 18, 2022	Palm Beach State College	Todd McDermott		P	P

=== Results ===
State senate district results

State house district results

United States Senate election in Florida, 2022
Party	Candidate	Votes	%	±%
Republican	Marco Rubio (incumbent)	4,474,847	57.68%	+5.70%
Democratic	Val Demings	3,201,522	41.27%	−3.04%
Libertarian	Dennis Misigoy	32,177	0.41%	−1.71%
Independent	Steven B. Grant	31,816	0.41%	N/A
Independent	Tuan TQ Nguyen	17,385	0.22%	N/A
Write-in		267	0.00%	±0.00%
Total votes		7,758,126	100.00%	N/A
Republican hold				

==== By county ====
By county

County	Marco Rubio Republican		Val Demings Democratic		Dennis Misigoy Libertarian		Steven B. Grant Independent		Tuan Nguyen Independent		Write-in		Margin		Total votes
County	#	%	#	%	#	%	#	%	#	%	#	%	#	%	Total votes
Alachua	39,220	40.97	55,439	57.91	439	0.46	349	0.36	285	0.30	2	0.00	-16,219	-16.94	95,734
Baker	9,431	88.21	1,181	11.05	43	0.40	31	0.29	6	0.06	0	0.00	8,250	77.16	10,692
Bay	51,657	77.15	14,547	21.73	300	0.45	255	0.38	196	0.29	1	0.00	37,110	55.42	66,956
Bradford	8,156	79.88	1,942	19.02	37	0.36	55	0.54	19	0.19	1	0.01	6,214	60.86	10,210
Brevard	165,233	61.85	98,978	37.05	1,236	0.46	1,075	0.40	631	0.24	10	0.00	66,255	24.80	267,163
Broward	238,962	39.96	353,575	59.12	2,081	0.35	2,083	0.35	1,223	0.20	122	0.02	-114,613	-19.16	598,046
Calhoun	4,067	84.17	700	14.49	13	0.27	40	0.83	12	0.25	0	0.00	3,367	69.68	4,832
Charlotte	63,845	69.06	27,757	30.02	254	0.27	452	0.49	138	0.15	2	0.00	36,088	39.04	92,448
Citrus	55,087	72.80	19,634	25.95	295	0.39	491	0.65	158	0.21	3	0.00	35,453	46.85	75,668
Clay	65,972	73.26	23,054	25.60	441	0.49	377	0.42	201	0.22	4	0.00	42,918	47.66	90,049
Collier	116,050	70.98	46,537	28.46	387	0.24	340	0.21	171	0.10	4	0.00	69,513	42.52	163,489
Columbia	18,344	77.55	5,070	21.43	93	0.39	103	0.44	45	0.19	0	0.00	13,274	56.11	23,655
DeSoto	6,469	74.71	2,097	24.22	27	0.31	51	0.59	15	0.17	0	0.00	4,372	50.49	8,659
Dixie	5,225	85.18	826	13.47	21	0.34	52	0.85	10	0.16	0	0.00	4,399	71.72	6,134
Duval	177,401	53.95	147,646	44.90	1,567	0.48	1,268	0.39	957	0.29	2	0.00	29,755	9.05	328,841
Escambia	73,225	63.40	40,790	35.32	598	0.52	459	0.40	420	0.36	4	0.00	32,435	28.08	115,496
Flagler	37,934	64.71	20,204	34.47	204	0.35	191	0.33	86	0.15	2	0.00	17,730	30.25	58,621
Franklin	3,885	71.71	1,471	27.15	23	0.42	29	0.54	10	0.18	0	0.00	2,414	44.56	5,418
Gadsden	6,086	35.01	11,113	63.93	63	0.36	99	0.57	23	0.13	0	0.00	-5,027	-28.92	17,384
Gilchrist	6,657	84.85	1,087	13.85	40	0.51	47	0.60	14	0.18	1	0.01	5,570	70.99	7,846
Glades	3,026	79.26	764	20.01	10	0.26	16	0.42	2	0.05	0	0.00	2,262	59.25	3,818
Gulf	5,069	78.97	1,295	20.17	19	0.30	24	0.37	12	0.19	0	0.00	3,774	58.79	6,419
Hamilton	3,030	70.76	1,215	28.37	18	0.42	15	0.35	4	0.09	0	0.00	1,815	42.39	4,282
Hardee	4,480	81.13	981	17.77	23	0.42	30	0.54	8	0.14	0	0.00	3,499	63.36	5,522
Hendry	6,008	72.97	2,121	25.76	36	0.44	54	0.66	14	0.17	0	0.00	3,887	47.21	8,233
Hernando	54,822	68.40	24,298	30.32	352	0.44	462	0.58	214	0.27	1	0.00	30,524	38.08	80,149
Highlands	28,777	72.43	10,480	26.38	146	0.37	266	0.67	62	0.16	0	0.00	18,297	46.05	39,731
Hillsborough	253,495	52.55	222,378	46.10	2,498	0.52	2,345	0.49	1,618	0.34	9	0.00	31,117	6.45	482,343
Holmes	6,151	90.86	556	8.21	23	0.34	34	0.50	6	0.09	0	0.00	5,596	82.64	6,770
Indian River	50,878	65.91	25,613	33.18	268	0.35	297	0.38	133	0.17	3	0.00	25,265	32.73	77,192
Jackson	12,188	74.87	3,956	24.30	41	0.25	80	0.49	14	0.09	0	0.00	8,232	50.57	16,279
Jefferson	4,137	58.07	2,929	41.11	24	0.34	24	0.34	10	0.14	0	0.00	1,208	16.96	7,124
Lafayette	2,521	86.72	348	11.97	11	0.38	22	0.76	5	0.17	0	0.00	2,173	74.75	2,907
Lake	103,103	64.43	55,377	34.61	619	0.39	624	0.39	287	0.18	3	0.00	47,726	29.83	160,013
Lee	185,123	67.44	87,108	31.73	898	0.33	934	0.34	446	0.16	1	0.00	98,015	35.71	274,510
Leon	46,511	39.59	69,677	59.31	495	0.42	428	0.36	375	0.32	1	0.00	-23,166	-19.72	117,487
Levy	13,690	76.63	3,944	22.08	70	0.39	116	0.65	44	0.25	1	0.01	9,746	54.55	17,865
Liberty	2,164	83.17	405	15.56	11	0.42	19	0.73	3	0.12	0	0.00	1,759	67.60	2,602
Madison	4,476	64.16	2,442	35.01	23	0.33	26	0.37	9	0.13	0	0.00	2,034	29.16	6,976
Manatee	108,234	63.15	61,423	35.84	737	0.43	680	0.40	312	0.18	8	0.00	46,811	27.31	171,394
Marion	104,655	67.18	49,698	31.90	625	0.40	579	0.37	228	0.15	6	0.00	54,957	35.28	155,791
Martin	52,312	67.44	24,639	31.77	242	0.31	259	0.33	110	0.14	2	0.00	27,673	35.68	77,564
Miami-Dade	386,251	54.27	318,978	44.82	2,593	0.36	2,633	0.37	1,257	0.18	3	0.00	67,273	9.45	711,715
Monroe	19,897	58.57	13,756	40.49	151	0.44	107	0.31	61	0.18	0	0.00	6,141	18.08	33,972
Nassau	35,944	75.33	11,337	23.76	201	0.42	166	0.35	64	0.13	1	0.00	24,607	51.57	47,713
Okaloosa	60,808	75.27	18,851	23.33	473	0.59	371	0.46	286	0.35	0	0.00	41,957	51.93	80,789
Okeechobee	8,532	78.54	2,218	20.42	38	0.35	59	0.54	16	0.15	0	0.00	6,314	58.12	10,863
Orange	177,105	43.51	225,569	55.42	1,758	0.43	1,388	0.34	1,224	0.30	9	0.00	-48,464	-11.91	407,053
Osceola	51,422	50.07	49,907	48.60	532	0.52	513	0.50	312	0.30	7	0.01	1,515	1.48	102,693
Palm Beach	267,715	49.34	269,839	49.73	1,800	0.33	2,240	0.41	1,010	0.19	14	0.00	-2,124	-0.39	542,618
Pasco	143,760	64.05	77,664	34.60	1,063	0.47	1,325	0.59	622	0.28	7	0.00	66,096	29.45	224,441
Pinellas	223,747	53.01	192,058	45.51	2,599	0.62	2,353	0.56	1,288	0.31	2	0.00	31,689	7.51	422,047
Polk	144,548	62.98	82,261	35.84	980	0.43	1,210	0.53	493	0.21	6	0.00	62,287	27.14	229,498
Putnam	19,812	74.65	6,450	24.30	96	0.36	139	0.52	43	0.16	0	0.00	13,362	50.35	26,540
Santa Rosa	59,111	78.22	15,554	20.58	392	0.52	323	0.43	190	0.25	0	0.00	43,557	57.64	75,570
Sarasota	129,865	59.46	86,618	39.66	744	0.34	832	0.38	355	0.16	2	0.00	43,247	19.80	218,416
Seminole	97,761	53.41	83,285	45.50	870	0.48	650	0.36	457	0.25	5	0.00	14,476	7.91	183,028
St. Johns	98,564	68.27	44,371	30.73	659	0.46	476	0.33	288	0.20	13	0.01	54,193	37.54	144,371
St. Lucie	69,924	57.40	50,851	41.74	415	0.34	414	0.34	220	0.18	0	0.00	19,073	15.66	121,824
Sumter	63,806	71.44	25,010	28.00	189	0.21	220	0.25	91	0.10	1	0.00	38,796	43.44	89,317
Suwannee	13,125	80.49	3,018	18.51	57	0.35	83	0.51	23	0.14	0	0.00	10,107	61.98	16,306
Taylor	6,063	79.60	1,495	19.63	25	0.33	26	0.34	8	0.11	0	0.00	4,568	59.97	7,617
Union	3,917	86.30	580	12.78	13	0.29	22	0.48	7	0.15	0	0.00	3,337	73.52	4,539
Volusia	139,085	61.58	84,543	37.43	943	0.42	871	0.39	417	0.18	3	0.00	54,542	24.15	225,862
Wakulla	10,485	69.91	4,343	28.96	69	0.46	65	0.43	35	0.23	1	0.01	6,142	40.95	14,998
Walton	28,203	81.00	6,326	18.17	124	0.36	99	0.28	65	0.19	0	0.00	21,877	62.83	34,817
Washington	7,641	84.01	1,345	14.79	42	0.46	50	0.55	17	0.19	0	0.00	6,296	69.22	9,095
Totals	4,474,847	57.68	3,201,522	41.27	32,177	0.41	31,816	0.41	17,385	0.22	267	0.00	1,273,325	16.41	7,758,014

Counties that flipped from Democratic to Republican

- Miami-Dade (largest municipality: Miami)
- Osceola (largest municipality: Kissimmee)
- St. Lucie (largest municipality: Port St. Lucie)

==== By congressional district ====
Rubio won 20 of 28 congressional districts.

District	Rubio	Demings	Representative
1st	72%	27%	Matt Gaetz
2nd	60%	39%	Neal Dunn
3rd	62%	37%	Kat Cammack
4th	59%	40%	Aaron Bean
5th	64%	35%	John Rutherford
6th	66%	33%	Michael Waltz
7th	57%	42%	Stephanie Murphy (117th Congress)
7th	57%	42%	Cory Mills (118th Congress)
8th	63%	36%	Bill Posey
9th	48%	51%	Darren Soto
10th	39%	60%	Val Demings (117th Congress)
10th	39%	60%	Maxwell Frost (118th Congress)
11th	61%	38%	Daniel Webster
12th	68%	31%	Gus Bilirakis
13th	56%	42%	Anna Paulina Luna
14th	45%	53%	Kathy Castor
15th	57%	41%	Laurel Lee
16th	60%	39%	Vern Buchanan
17th	63%	36%	Greg Steube
18th	68%	31%	Scott Franklin
19th	68%	31%	Byron Donalds
20th	28%	71%	Sheila Cherfilus-McCormick
21st	61%	39%	Brian Mast
22nd	46%	53%	Lois Frankel
23rd	48%	51%	Jared Moskowitz
24th	29%	69%	Frederica Wilson
25th	45%	54%	Debbie Wasserman Schultz
26th	70%	30%	Mario Díaz-Balart
27th	57%	42%	María Elvira Salazar
28th	63%	37%	Carlos A. Giménez

==== Voter demographics ====
Edison Research exit poll
Demographic subgroup	Demings	Rubio	No answer	% of voters
Gender
Men	37	62	1	49
Women	48	51	1	51
Age
18–24 years old	57	41	2	7
25–29 years old	58	39	2	4
30–39 years old	55	43	N/A	13
40–49 years old	41	58	1	12
50–64 years old	38	62	N/A	32
65 and older	37	62	1	33
Race
White	35	64	1	64
Black	90	9	N/A	11
Latino	41	56	2	21
Race by gender
White men	28	71	N/A	32
White women	43	57	2	32
Black men	89	11	1	5
Black women	92	8	N/A	6
Latino men	42	55	2	10
Latina women	41	57	1	11
Education
High school or less	35	63	2	15
Some college education	42	58	1	25
Associate degree	42	57	2	19
Bachelor's degree	44	54	1	24
Advanced degree	48	51	1	17
Party ID
Democrats	97	3	N/A	28
Republicans	3	97	1	42
Independents	48	49	2	30
Ideology
Liberals	91	8	1	20
Moderates	57	41	1	39
Conservatives	7	93	2	42
Marital status
Married	40	60	1	59
Unmarried	50	48	2	41
Gender by marital status
Married men	33	66	1	30
Married women	46	53	1	29
Unmarried men	48	51	3	18
Unmarried women	52	47	2	23
First-time midterm election voter
Yes	42	58	4	11
No	44	55	N/A	89
Most important issue facing the country
Crime	32	66	2	10
Inflation	28	72	1	39
Gun policy	63	36	N/A	10
Immigration	12	88	N/A	10
Abortion	81	18	N/A	24
Area type
Urban	45	54	1	46
Suburban	42	57	2	44
Rural	31	68	N/A	10
Source: CNN

== See also ==
- Elections in Florida
- Political party strength in Florida
- Florida Democratic Party
- Florida Republican Party
- Government of Florida
- 2022 United States House of Representatives elections in Florida
- 2022 Florida gubernatorial election
- 2022 Florida House of Representatives election
- 2022 Florida Senate election
- 2022 Florida elections
- 2022 United States gubernatorial elections
- 2022 United States elections

== Notes ==
Partisan clients
