= William Sanchez =

William Sanchez may refer to:

- William Sánchez of Gascony (died 996), Duke of Gascony
- William Sánchez (volleyball) (born 1986), Dominican Republic volleyball player
- William Sanchez (lawyer) (born 1961), American lawyer and government official
