= Todd McDermott =

American journalist

Todd McDermott (born April 6, 1966) is an Emmy Award-winning television journalist who works for WPBF in West Palm Beach, Florida. McDermott is a Buffalo, New York native, and has a Bachelor of Arts degree in political science from Canisius University in Buffalo.

From 1998 until 2000, McDermott worked for WMAR-TV in Baltimore, Maryland as a news anchor, winning an Emmy for Best Anchor in the Washington DC/Baltimore region. After leaving WMAR, McDermott joined WCBS-TV in New York City, New York where he worked from 2000 until 2004. His tenure included anchoring coverage of the September 11 attacks in Lower Manhattan. His reporting from Ground Zero on the one year anniversary of the 9/11 attacks won him an Associated Press Award for outstanding reporting. While working for CBS in New York, he also reported for and served as an occasional host and anchor for The Early Show and CBS This Morning.

From September 2004 until September 2008, McDermott co-anchored the 6 p.m. and 11 p.m. newscast on WUSA (TV) in Washington, DC. He was the anchorman for several prominent events, including going live from The Pentagon]] on the 5th anniversary of 9/11, the White House for the Presidential inauguration, and the U.S. Capitol's Statuary Hall for multiple State of the Union Addresses. After leaving WUSA, McDermott joined WPXI-TV, the NBC affiliate in Pittsburgh, as co-anchor of the weekday morning and noon newscasts. In October 2012, he moved to co-anchor the weeknight newscasts at WPBF, the ABC affiliate in West Palm Beach, Florida.

In January 2015, McDermott led a team from WPBF-TV to Havana, Cuba to report live on historic diplomatic talks between the Barack Obama administration and the Raúl Castro regime. During that time, McDermott and his co-workers gained significant access to the Cuban people in their homes. The resulting hour-long documentary, "Cuba Unlocked" was reported, written, and produced by McDermott. "Cuba Unlocked" won an Emmy in the Miami/Orlando/West Palm region for Outstanding News Special.

On October 18, 2022, McDermott moderated the Florida Senate Debate for the 2022 United States Senate election in Florida.
