= Steven B. Grant =

American politician and attorney

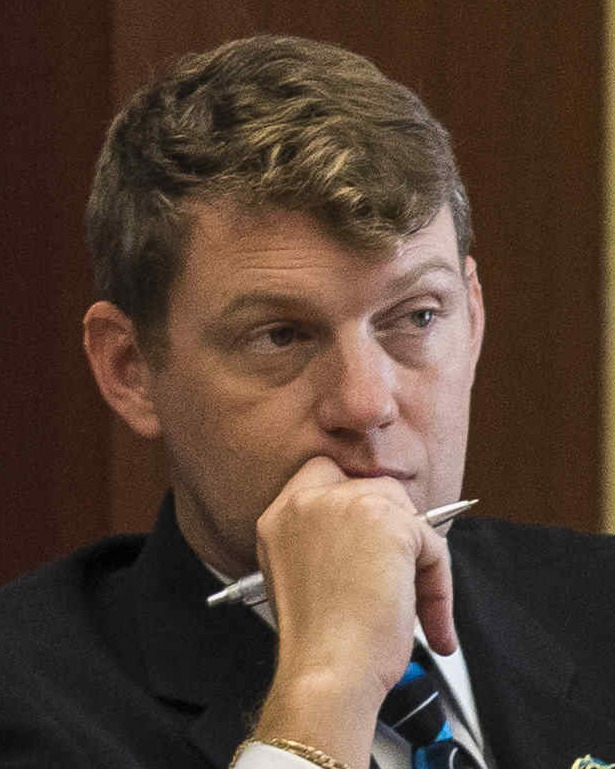
- Grant in 2021

55th Mayor of Boynton Beach
- In office April 2016 – March 2022
- Preceded by: Jerry Taylor
- Succeeded by: Ty Penserga

Personal details
- Born: March 7, 1983 (age 43)
- Party: Democratic (until 2016, 2023–present)
- Other political affiliations: Independent (2020–2023); Republican (2016–2020)
- Education: Robert H. Smith School of Business; Florida Coastal School of Law

Steven B. Grant (born March 7, 1983) is an attorney and an American politician who served as the mayor of Boynton Beach, Florida from 2016 to 2022. He graduated in 2005 from the University of Maryland Robert H. Smith School of Business with a bachelor of science degree in Finance. He then earned a J.D. from the Florida Coastal School of Law in 2010, and has studied abroad at the Royal Melbourne Institute of Technology, China University of Political Science and Law in Beijing, and the University of the Netherlands Antilles.

== Political career ==
Grant ran for mayor of Boynton Beach in 2016, alongside incumbent mayor Jerry Taylor, and three other candidates. Taylor and Grant placed first and second respectively in the first round and advanced to the runoff. Grant earned 57% in the runoff, defeating the incumbent. Grant won re-election in 2019, winning 62% of the vote against three other candidates. Grant ran as an independent candidate in the 2022 United States Senate election in Florida against incumbent Republican Marco Rubio, placing fourth behind the incumbent, Democrat Val Demings, and Libertarian Dennis Misigoy.
