= Patrick G. Carrick =

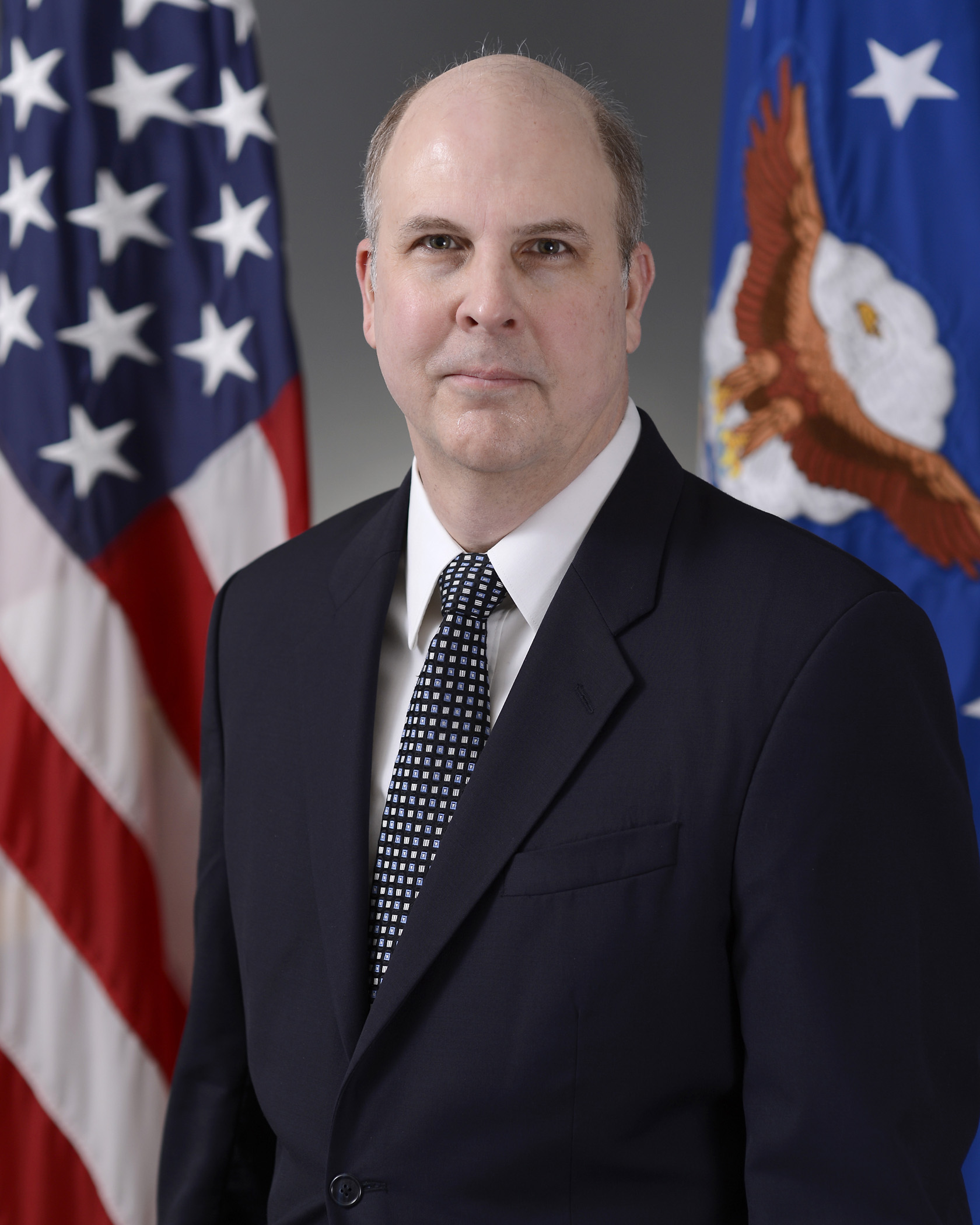
Patrick G. Carrick in 2013

Patrick G. Carrick was a member of the Senior Executive Service and an academic.

== Career ==
Before joining the United States Department of Defense, Carrick was assistant professor of physics at Mississippi State University and Director of the Shared Laser Facility at the University of Oregon. In 1989 he was assigned to Edwards Air Force Base to do research in rocket propulsion. From 1994 to 1999 Carrick was leading the research of the propellants branch in Edwards Air Force Base, California as chief. He was assigned to The Pentagon in 2004. In 2007 he was named Director of Physics and Electronics of the Air Force Office of Scientific Research. In 2014 he was assigned to the Department of Homeland Security (DHS) as deputy director of the Homeland Security Advanced Research Projects Agency (HSARPA). He became Director of HSARPA in 2015. In 2016 he was also assigned to be the Acting Chief Scientist for the DHS Science and Technology Directorate. In November 2017 he became the Chief Scientist, Science and Technology Directorate at DHS. He retired from federal civil service in December 2018.

== Education ==
- B.S., Chemistry - University of Wisconsin-Madison
- Ph.D., Chemistry - Rice University
- M.S., National Resource Strategy - Industrial College of the Armed Forces
