= Immigrant and Employee Rights Section =

Office of the United States Department of Justice

The Immigrant and Employee Rights Section (formerly the Office of Special Counsel for Immigration-Related Unfair Employment Practices or OSC), in the Civil Rights Division of the United States Department of Justice, is responsible for enforcing the Immigration Reform and Control Act of 1986 (IRCA), which protects US citizens and certain other individual from discriminations based on their citizenship or immigration status. It is headed by a Special Counsel, appointed by the President for a four-year term and confirmed by the Senate.

The Immigrant and Employee Rights Section was established as OSC in 1986 by the IRCA, changing its name to Immigrant and Employee Rights Section effective January 18, 2017.

== Special Counsels ==
- Lawrence J. Siskind (1987–1989)
- William Ho-Gonzalez (–1997)
- John D. Trasvina (1997–2001)
- Juan Carlos Benitez (2001–2004)
- William Sanchez (2004–2007)
- Patrick P. Shen (2007–2009)

As of August 2017, the position of Special Counsel is vacant.
