= Ty Penserga =

Filipino-American politician

Mayor of Boynton Beach
- In office March 2022 – March 2025
- Preceded by: Steven B. Grant
- Succeeded by: Rebecca Shelton

Personal details
- Born: 1989 (age 36–37) Leyte, Philippines
- Occupation: Scientist; Teacher

Ty Penserga is a Filipino American politician and former mayor of the city of Boynton Beach in Florida. He is the first openly gay mayor of the city and the sixth LGBTQ+ and first Asian American in Palm Beach County

== Early life ==
Penserga was born on the island of Leyte in the Philippines in 1989. He grew up with his grandparents for the first few years of his life, he then joined his mother in Florida who had immigrated there earlier.

He attended JFK Middle School, in Riviera Beach. In school Penserga was bullied by classmates due to his Asian American heritage.

Penserga graduated Temple University in Philadelphia with a bachelor's degree in Chemistry and Biology. He went on to study for his master's on neuroscience at the Florida Atlantic University. He also began studying for a doctorate on integrative biology and neuroscience at the university. However, he did not complete it.

He published his first paper at age 17 and has work published in the Frontiers in Neuroscience. His research focuses on advanced imaging techniques to uncover the underlying pathology of Alzheimer's disease.

He began working as a high school chemistry teacher at the Suncoast Community High School.

== Political Career ==
Penserga ran for District 4 in 2019 to finish the term of Joe Casello who was elected to the Florida House of Representatives, covering most of the gated communities in the area against Rick Maharajh and Muriel Waldmann. He won with a majority of 52% of the vote avoiding a runoff against his opponents. He became the first Asian-American and LGBTQ+ City Commissioner elected to the council.

He was re-elected in District 4 in 2020 with 63% against former City Commissioner David Katz and former opponent Rick Maharajh. He was later appointed Vice-Mayor and served on the board of the Boynton Beach Community Redevelopment Agency. Quantum Park Overlay Dependent District and the South County Regional Wastewater Treatment and Disposal.

In 2021, he was a speaker at a vigil in Lake Worth Beach to remember the spree of violence against Asian Americans including the 2021 Atlanta spa shooting, where six of the eight victims killed were Asian American women.

=== Mayoral Campaign and Tenure ===
In 2022, Penserga ran for the mayorship of Boynton Beach after incumbent mayor Steven B. Grant was term-limited. His campaign was supported by the LGBTQ Victory Fund.

He faced three other candidates, Cindy Falco-Di Corrado, Golene Gordon and Bernard Wright. Wright made homophopic comments about Penserga in a Facebook video during the campaign, saying "He wants to make this city a gay city." and "I ain't with the LGBT."

He was elected with more than 57% of the vote, becoming the first LGBTQ+ mayor of the city and sixth ever in Palm Beach County and the first Asian American mayor as well. He was elected hours after the Florida Legislature passed the Don't Say Gay act, forbidding conversation and discussion of gender identity and sexual orientation in classrooms.

Penserga is term limited and could not run for another term as mayor. He was succeeded by real estate broker Rebecca Shelton, who defeated three other candidates.
