= John D. Trasviña =

American lawyer

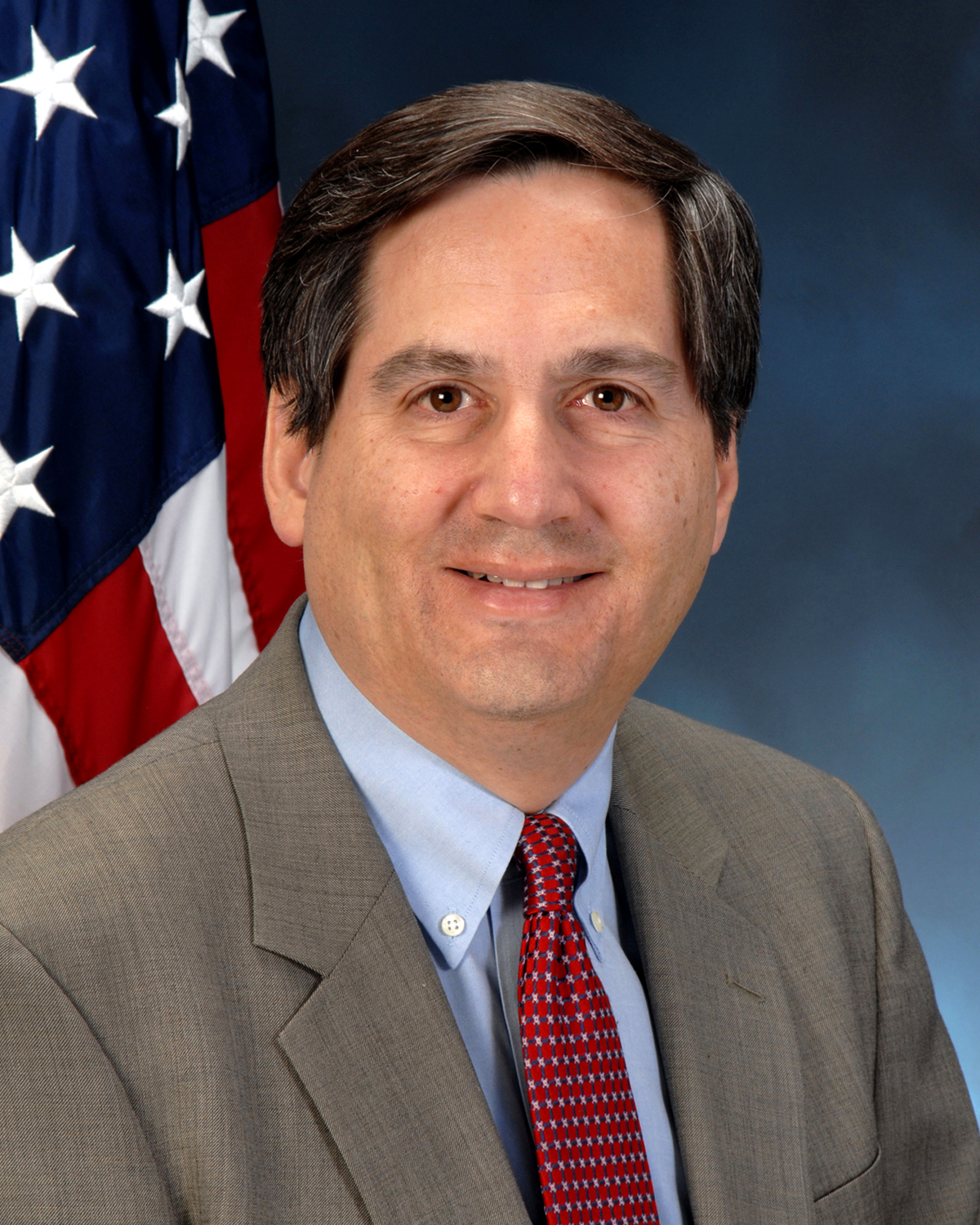
- Born: 1958 (age 67–68); San Francisco, California, U.S.
- Education: Harvard University; Stanford Law School
- Occupations: Attorney; former dean of the University of San Francisco School of Law

John David Trasviña (born 1958) is an American human rights attorney. He is the former dean of the University of San Francisco School of Law. Previous to that, he was assistant secretary of the Office of Fair Housing and Equal Opportunity in the U.S. Department of Housing and Urban Development, president and general counsel of the Mexican American Legal Defense and Educational Fund (MALDEF), and special counsel for Immigration Related Unfair Employment Practices at the U.S. Department of Justice. He was named principal legal advisor at U.S. Immigration and Customs Enforcement in January 2021.

== Career ==
Trasviña is a native of San Francisco, where he attended Lowell High School; he then received degrees from Harvard University and Stanford Law School. He has focused his work at the local and federal levels on civil rights, voting rights, immigration policy, worker rights and education.

After graduating from Stanford Law School, Trasviña began his career as a deputy city attorney in San Francisco from 1983 to 1985, and then went to MALDEF in Washington, D.C., from 1985 to 1987 as a legislative counsel. From there he moved to Capitol Hill to work for Paul Simon in 1987 first as counsel and then in 1993 as general counsel and staff director for the United States Senate Judiciary Subcommittee on the Constitution, Civil Rights and Property Rights.

During the Clinton Administration he was appointed to be Special Counsel for Immigration Related Unfair Employment Practices at the U.S. Department of Justice in 1997. He also served as deputy assistant attorney general for legislative affairs at the U.S. Department of Justice.

After leaving DOJ in 2001 he was the director of the Discrimination Research Center in Berkeley and taught at Stanford Law School. He returned to MALDEF, and took the position of president and general counsel in November 2006.

On March 26, 2009, Trasviña was announced as President Obama's nominee to be assistant secretary of the Office of Fair Housing and Equal Opportunity in the U.S. Department of Housing and Urban Development. His nomination was confirmed by the U.S. Senate on May 1, 2009.

In May 2013, Trasviña was named the dean of the University of San Francisco School of Law, effective June 17, 2013. He concluded his term as dean in June 2018.

== Community involvement ==
Trasviña has been a member of the San Francisco Elections Commission, president of the Harvard Club of San Francisco. He has served on the boards of the La Raza Lawyers Association, CORO of Northern California, the Lowell High School Alumni Association (elected President in January 2016), the League of Women Voters and the Pacific Coast Immigration Museum, Latino Issues Forum, Campaign for College Opportunity and the Harvard Club of Southern California.

He has also been an officer with the D.C. Hispanic Bar Association, the Hispanic National Bar Association the Conference on Asian Pacific American Leadership, and the D.C. Commission on Asian and Pacific Islander Affairs.

He has been called one of the 100 Most Influential Hispanics in the United States by Hispanic Business magazine. In 2000, he was honored with the MALDEF Award for Excellence in the Legal Profession and the Distinguished Service Award by the Conference on Asian Pacific American Leadership.
