= Black Point Marina =

Black Point Park & Marina (Florida)

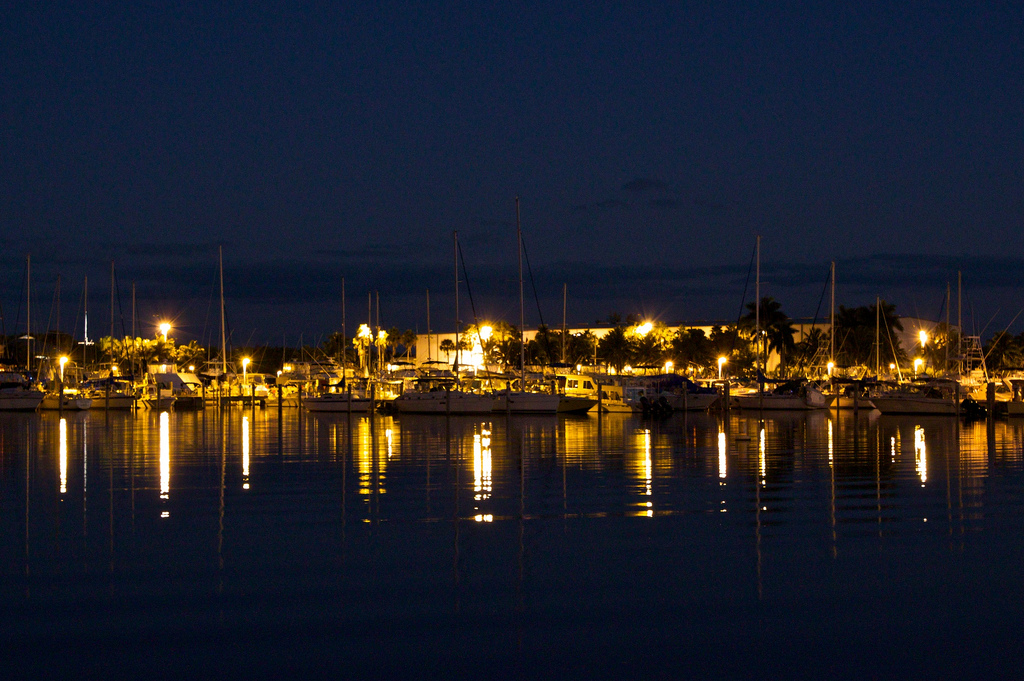
A photograph of Black Point Marina during the night.

Black Point Park & Marina, oftentimes referred to as "Black Point," is the largest public marina located in Miami and it is part of the Miami-Dade Parks & Recreation department. The marina is also very close to Biscayne National Park. Black Point is a starting point for fishing and diving expeditions, especially among locals. The park consists of large picnic pavilions, grills, bikeways, jogging trails and a jetty, which extends 1.5 miles into Biscayne Bay.

== History ==
In the early 1970s, Black Point was an isolated area where sailors anchored their vessels to take a break as they headed toward Key West. In 1972, a countywide referendum established that this site was to be turned into a marina. After 11 years of pulling permits and receiving government approvals, the site plan was finally accepted. In 1992, Hurricane Andrew destroyed the marina. Many doubted that the damage could be reversed. The businesses of fisherman and boats of sailors were devastated and some were never recovered.

== Wildlife ==
Sightings of the Florida manatee are common at Black Point Marina. Many manatees are brought to this "Manatee Sanctuary" for release and study. The manatee is an endangered species. Black Point Marina and Miami-Dade County have placed provisions and ordinances in place to ensure that they are protected in these areas. American crocodiles also frequent the area. Because of the danger they pose, management prohibits anyone from swimming in these waters.

== Black Point's Ocean Grill Restaurant ==
Black Point Park & Marina attracts locals throughout day and night by the means of its Ocean Grill restaurant. Since 2005, this restaurant has served seasonal seafood dishes, along with other foods associated with bars like hand-cut steaks and sandwiches. The waterfront restaurant and bar has a casual setting for all patrons. There is also an ample amount of space around the restaurant that is available for boaters to dock their vessels with direct access to the site. During the night, the Ocean Grill restaurant has a live band that plays a variety of music, from Rock to Blues.

== Special events ==
Annually, Black Point hosts the "4th of July Spectacular." This event is held for locals and is supported by the Parks Foundation of Miami-Dade, Miami-Dade County District 8 and the city of Cutler Bay. Family and friends typically congregate with lawn chairs and blankets to watch the annual waterfront firework show.

The marina and its boat ramps are opened 24 hours a day. Marine Fuel (non-ethanol gasoline and diesel) and kayak/canoe rentals are available on-site at Loggerhead Marina - dry storage for boats located in Black Point Park. www.loggerheadmiami.com.

== Geography ==
Black Point Marina is located at 25°32′23.31″N 80°19′46.35″W. It is situated in the residential neighborhood of Cutler Bay, FL.
