= William Sanchez (lawyer) =

American lawyer and government official

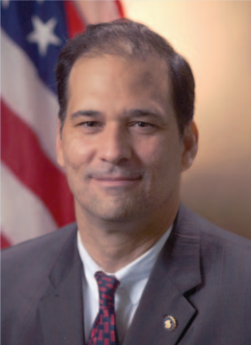

Special Counsel for the United States Department of Justice
- In office 2004–2007
- Appointed by: George W. Bush
- Preceded by: Juan Carlos Benitez
- Succeeded by: Patrick P. Shen

Personal details
- Born: 1961 (age 63–64); New York City, U.S.
- Political party: Democratic (since 2016); Republican (until 2016)
- Education: University of Miami (BA); Georgetown University (JD)

William Jose Sanchez (born 1961) is an American lawyer who served as the special counsel for the Office of Immigration-Related Unfair Employment Practices in the Civil Rights Division of the United States Department of Justice from 2004 to 2007.

== Early life and education ==
Sanchez was born in Manhattan, New York in 1961. Sanchez is Cuban American; his parents fled Cuba during the Cuban Revolution, and his uncle was later executed by the Cuban military.

He graduated from the University of Miami in 1982, and received a Juris doctor from Georgetown University Law Center in 1986.

== Career ==
=== Private career ===
After graduating from Georgetown University, Sanchez worked as an immigration attorney in Florida, working primarily with migrant workers and refugees from Haiti and Cuba, and regularly taking cases to federal courts and the Board of Immigration Appeals. Sanchez was also an attorney for the Haitian Refugee Center, and taught international law at Ateneo de Manila University in the Philippines.

=== Government career ===
Sanchez, a Republican, was nominated by President George W. Bush to be the special counsel for the Office of Special Counsel for Immigration-Related Unfair Employment Practices. Sanchez was unanimously confirmed by the United States Senate on December 4, 2004. Sanchez left the office in 2007.

=== Post-government career ===
Sanchez was an opponent of the 2010 Arizona SB 1070, a controversial immigration bill passed in Arizona. In the 2016 United States Presidential election, Sanchez was among a number of prominent Bush administration officials who endorsed Hillary Clinton. In the wake of the election, Sanchez switched to the Democratic Party.

During the 2021 Cuban protests, Sanchez worked alongside several human rights organizations, working to connect Cuban exiles with relatives in Cuba. In 2021, Sanchez also worked on the legal team for the government of the Democratic Republic of the Congo regarding legal arbitration against the government from Dig Oil, an oil exploration company.

Sanchez's aunt and uncle were killed in the Surfside condominium collapse.

Sanchez filed a case on behalf of Florida taxpayers against Florida governor Ron DeSantis who signed the bill to abolish the Reedy Creek Improvement District. The case was dismissed by federal judge Cecilia Altonaga.

Sanchez was a candidate for the Democratic nomination in the 2022 United States Senate election in Florida, coming in third place with 5.6% of the vote.
