= Ann Tutwiler =

Former Director-General of Bioversity International

M. Ann Tutwiler
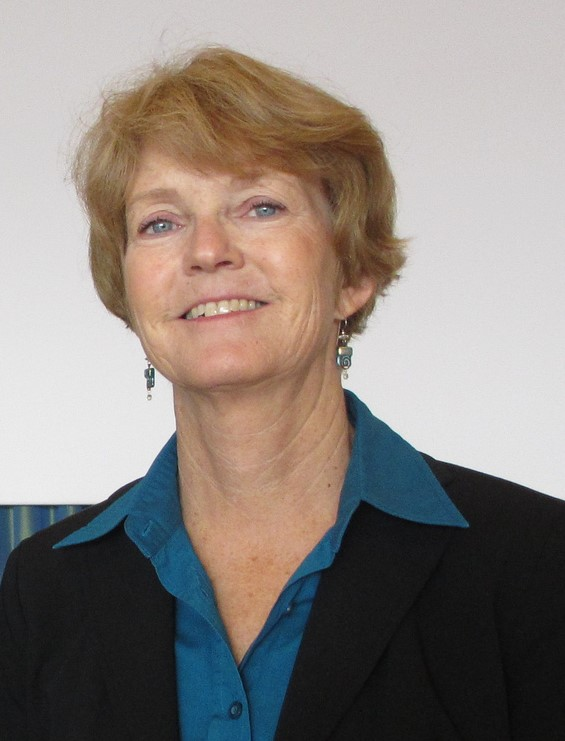
- Born: Margaret Ann Tutwiler; January 23, 1958; Columbia, South Carolina
- Occupation: Agriculturalist
- Years active: 35
- Known for: Director General of Bioversity International

Ann Tutwiler (born 23 January 1958) is a Senior Fellow with Meridian Institute and serves as a senior advisor to the Food Forward Consortium and formerly was the senior advisor to the Just Rural Transition. She also chairs the Expert Review Committee for the Food and Agriculture Benchmark for the World Benchmarking Alliance. Previously, she was the Director General of Bioversity International from July 2013 to February 2019 and the first woman Deputy Director-General of the United Nations Food and Agriculture Organization (FAO) from January 2011 to November 2012. In 2022, she has been awarded the John Knox Batten Teaching Fellowship in Public Policy at Davidson College in North Carolina where she taught two undergraduate classes in food systems transformation.

== Education ==
Margaret Ann Tutwiler, sometimes referred to a M. Ann Tutwiler or, more simply, Ann Tutwiler, was born in Columbia, South Carolina in the United States. She obtained a bachelor's degree from the Presbyterian Davidson College in North Carolina and a master's degree from the John F. Kennedy School of Government at Harvard University. She also has executive education certificates in agribusiness from Purdue University and INSEAD. Her studies included a period in Spain and she also worked as a teacher in a remote part of Western Kenya.

== Career ==
From 1981 to 1983, Tutwiler was the Publications Editor for the Group of Thirty, a wise men's group working on international finance and monetary affairs. After completing graduate school, she was selected as a Presidential Management Intern, where she worked for USDA's Economic Research Service. From there, she moved to the National Center for Food and Agricultural Policy (1987–1992) where she co-authored numerous articles on US and EU agricultural policy, and international trade. While at NCFAP, she co-founded the International Food and Agricultural Trade Policy Council where she was deputy director until 1992. From 1992 to 2002 Tutwiler was Director of Government Relations for the multinational agribusiness company Eridania Béghin-Say. She was a leading force behind the 1996 Farm Bill reforms. From 2002 to December 2005 she was the President of the International Food and Trade Policy Council, based in Washington D.C. The work of the IPC had a significant impact on the Uruguay Round Agreement on Agriculture and on subsequent WTO negotiations in agriculture. At the beginning of 2006 she joined the William and Flora Hewlett Foundation, where she created the Foundation's agricultural markets program. While at the Hewlett Foundation, she helped co-develop the African Agricultural Corridors Project which led to investments in farm infrastructure in Tanzania and Kenya, inter alia. She joined the United States Department of Agriculture (USDA) as the Global Food Security Coordinator in 2009, where she helped develop the Feed the Future strategy and coordinated USDA's participation in President Barack Obama's 'Feed the Future' initiative. In January 2011 she took up the post as Deputy Director-General for Knowledge at FAO, Rome, moving to FAO's Geneva office in late 2012 as a Special Advisor to the Director-General, Graziano da Silva. In July 2013 Tutwiler became Director General of Bioversity International, an organization based near Rome that is devoted to safeguarding agricultural biodiversity and is one of the 15 members of the CGIAR partnership. In addition to her role as Director General, Tutwiler also served in various leadership capacities within the CGIAR governance system.

On leaving Bioversity Tutwiler became Chair of the Steering Committee of the CGIAR Research Program on Water, Land and Ecosystems (WLE); she is a Senior Fellow at the Meridian Institute, a non-profit food and agriculture consultancy; and an Advisor to Climate AI and to the US Dairy Export Federation. She chairs the Expert Review Committee of the World Benchmarking Alliance's Food and Agriculture Benchmark (and was formerly chair of the advisory board of the Access to Seeds Foundation. She also served on the advisory board of Foodshot Global. She is also a board member with CABI.

== Awards ==
Ann Tutwiler received the John W. Kuykendall Award for Community Service in 2005. This is an award given annually to alumni of Davidson College. Tutwiler has been selected as the Batten Professorship at Davidson College, where she will teach a course on global food systems' transformation.
