= John C. Rogers =

American government official

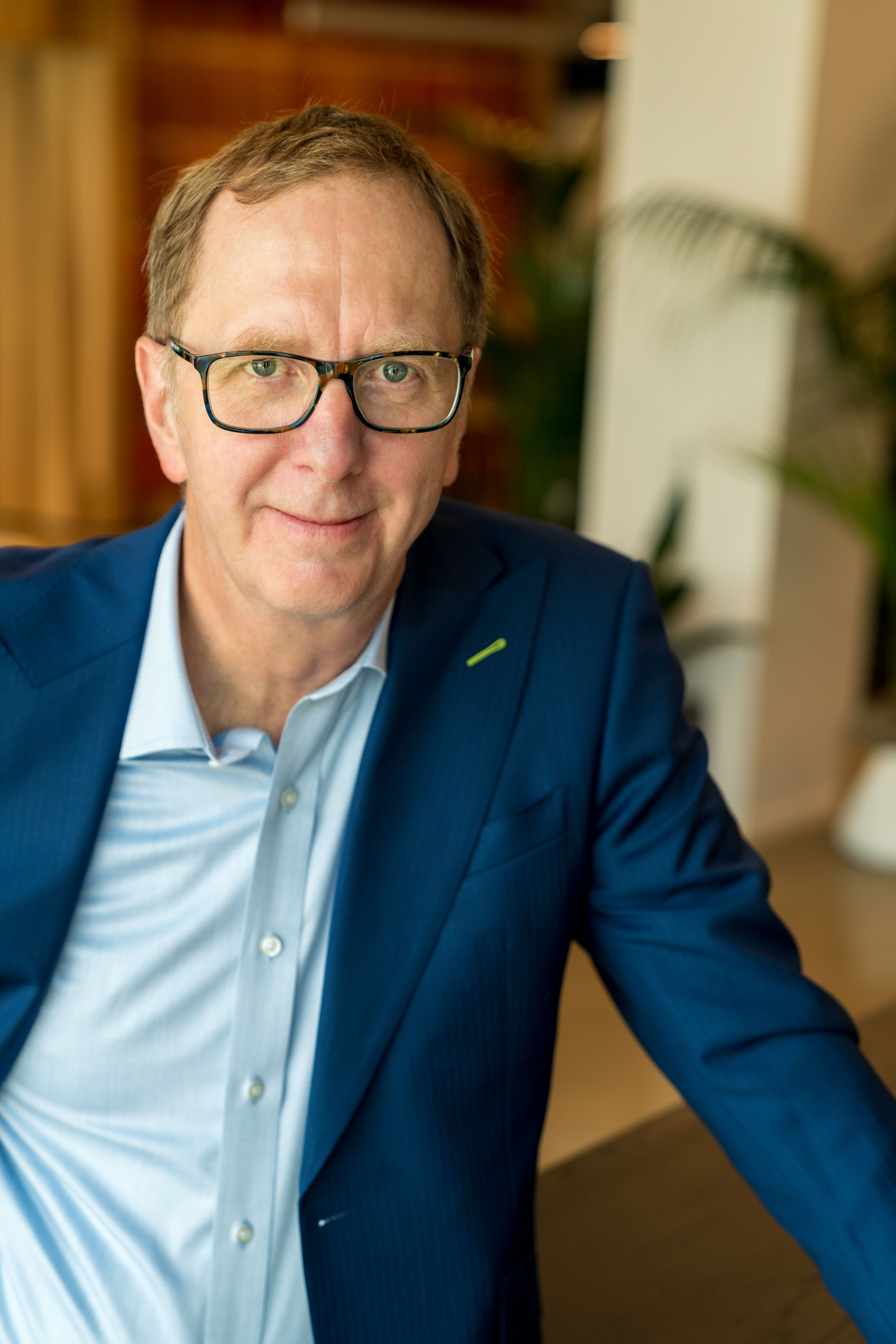
John C. Rogers

John Rogers is a former deputy assistant secretary in the office of Secretary of Defense Les Aspin involved in advancing stem cell medical research in the political and strategic arena. He also contributes regularly on National Defense issues in the United States. During Rogers' 30-year career, he has founded a number of organizations in the public policy and national security industries. He is the co-founder and current CEO of Capstone National Partners, a Washington, D.C.–based government relations firm. John is also the founder and CEO of RL Leaders, an agency serving as the nexus between the entertainment, technology, and national security communities. Rogers has previously served as interim-CEO of MV Transportation and past chairman of the board for the Brain Aneurysm Foundation, in brain aneurysm awareness, education, support, advocacy, and research funding. Rogers is also on the Board of Director for Vendini, a technology company that provides ticketing, marketing, fundraising and patron management. In 2019, John authored his first book ‘The Renaissance Campaign: A Problem Solving Formula for Your Biggest Challenges’ detailing his experiences and innovative strategies for complex problem-solving across the public and private sectors. He continues to work in creative problem solving, holistic thinking, and multi-disciplinary consultations with Hollywood creatives and subject matter experts.

== Early life and education ==
Born on October 28, 1960, Rogers spent his childhood in Park Forest, Illinois, a Chicago suburb. His mother was a singer for the Chicago Symphony Orchestra and his father, a World War II veteran, was an insurance executive. Rogers met many prominent Illinois politicians in his early years, serving as the impetus to go into public service.

After attending the University of Iowa, Rogers began his career in public service in 1982 by volunteering on political campaigns in Iowa. Moving back to Wisconsin, Rogers was the campaign director for Matt Flynn's (D-Milwaukee) senate race in 1986. Following Flynn's loss, Rogers was tapped to be a staffer for Congressman Les Aspin (D-Wisconsin) in which he held the positions of Ombudsman (district director) and Political Director. Rogers first began his work with the "mixed tables" approach to problem solving in 1991 while working for Congressman Aspin. Rogers was also the Director of the Senate Democratic Caucus for the Wisconsin State Senate from 1989 to 1990.

== Department of Defense ==
Following the 1992 elections, President William J. Clinton appointed Rogers to the post of Acting Principal Deputy Assistant Secretary of Defense for Legislative Affairs and later Deputy Assistant Secretary (LA) Plans and Operations at the Department of Defense. As part of the Secretary of Defense's inner circle he assisted in the creation of strategies and tactics on significant defense policies. He also served as a key facilitator between the Department of Defense, the White House, and Congress on issues such as military base closures, military base re-use efforts, technology reinvestment programs, and privatization issues.

== Private sector career ==
Rogers left the Pentagon and became a consultant for various corporate interests before becoming a founding partner of RWR Consulting in 1994. Rogers was also one of the co-founders of Pace-Capstone, a government affairs and strategic development firm, in 1997. Capstone developed a partnership with the Whyte, Hirschboek, & Dudek law firm a few years later with Rogers assuming the title of president of WHD Government Affairs. In 2010, Rogers left Whyte, Hirschboek, & Dudek Government Affairs and reestablished Capstone National Partners, a public affairs firm in Milwaukee, WI, and Washington, DC. Rogers is currently the CEO and largest share holder in Capstone National Partners.

In 2009, Rogers took over as the CEO of RL Leaders. Leaders also developed a curriculum around the Aspin "mixed tables" called the Deep Applied Creativity™ methodology for government and non governmental clients.

In January 2017, MV Transportation named Rogers as their interim CEO. Headquartered in Dallas, MV Transportation, Inc. is the largest private provider of paratransit services and the largest privately owned passenger transportation contracting firm based in the United States. Rogers has been a member of the MV board of directors since September 2015.

Rogers also serves as the chairman of the executive board of the Wisconsin Procurement Institute, a non-profit organization that assists Wisconsin companies in capturing federal contracts and was appointed by Governor Jim Doyle as Commissioner for the Southeastern Wisconsin Regional Planning Commission.

== Philanthropy and non-profit ==
Rogers worked with Michael J. Fox to create the 2006 Mid-term election stem cell political movement that is acknowledged to have impacted political races across the United States. Rogers's contributions to Mr. Fox's political outreach efforts are chronicled in Mr. Fox's book, "Always Looking Up." He is a founding executive board member of the Coalition for the Advancement of Medical Research (CAMR) and the former Vice Chairman of the Parkinson's Action Network. Rogers has also been an active contributor to the mission of the Christopher and Dana Reeve Foundation .

== Personal life ==
Rogers lives in Oconomowoc, Wisconsin with his wife. He has taken an active interest in painting and photography.
