= James M. Galloway =

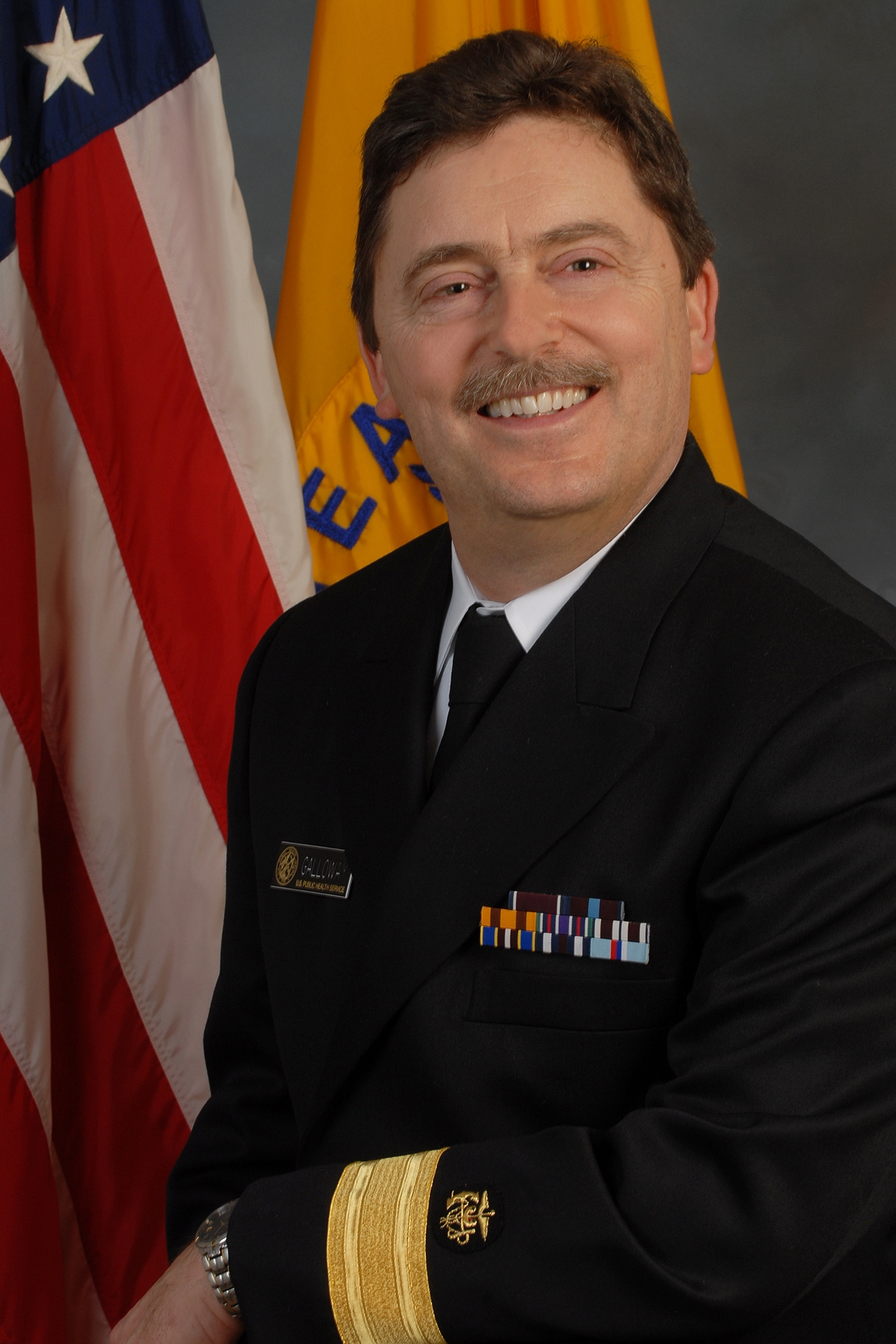
- Occupation: Physician
- Known for: Regional Health Administrator, United States Department of Health and Human Services; Senior Federal Official for Health, Region C, Department of Homeland Security

James M. Galloway is an American public health physician. Galloway served as the Regional Health Administrator for the United States Department of Health and Human Services for the six eastern states that comprise Region V under Presidents George W. Bush and Barack Obama. He also served as the Senior Federal Official for Health for Pandemic Influenza and Bioterrorism for the Department of Homeland Security's Region C, which includes an additional six states. Galloway was the lead for one of CDC's lead efforts as the Director of the Office of Health System Collaboration, integrating clinical care and public health at a national level.

Galloway is also an author, having published more than 170 articles, abstracts and book chapters. He also wrote a book, Primary Care of Native American Patients: Diagnosis, Therapy and Epidemiology. He has received numerous awards, including being named as one of the "Best Doctors in America", and has been awarded the Surgeon General's Exemplary Service Medal, USPHS Clinical Physician of the Year, Outstanding Clinician for the Indian Health Service nationally in 1997 and has been twice awarded the Secretary of Health and Human Services' Award for Distinguished Service as well as recognitions from the Governor of Arizona and the Mayor of Chicago.

== Education and professional affiliations ==
Galloway received his medical degree from the Medical College of Virginia and completed his medical residency at the University of Vermont. His fellowship in Cardiology was at the University of Arizona and he trained at Harvard in an Executive Leadership Masters of Health Care Management Program. He has been board-certified in both internal medicine and cardiology; a fellow of the American College of Physicians, the American College of Chest Physicians, the American College of Cardiology and the American Heart Association.

Galloway achieved the rank of rear admiral before retiring from the United States Public Health Service.

== Career ==
Before relocating to Chicago as Regional Health Administrator, Galloway organized and provided direct cardiac care to Native Americans in Arizona, Nevada, Utah, California and New Mexico. He served as Director of the Native American Cardiology Program at the University of Arizona and developed the Center for Native American Health within the emerging School of Public Health. He was subsequently the senior cardiologist nationally for the Indian Health Service and the director of the National Native American Cardiovascular Disease Prevention Program.

In March 2007, Galloway was appointed to the position of Regional Health Administrator by the Assistant Secretary of Health (ASH). He is the principal federal public health official and the senior United States Public Health Service officer for Region V, which covers the eastern states of Illinois, Indiana, Michigan, Minnesota, Ohio, and Wisconsin. He also serves as the Senior Federal Official for Health for Pandemic Influenza and Bioterrorism for the Department of Homeland Security's Region C (including the DHHS Region V states and VIII: Colorado, Montana, North Dakota, South Dakota, Utah and Wyoming).

Galloway has been deployed to work with Admiral Thad Allen, Deepwater Horizon Incident Commander as the HHS Senior Health Official for the Deepwater Horizon Oil Spill and the HHS Secretary’s representative to the National Incident Command where he serves as the government-wide coordinator of the health issues related to the response under the Assistant Secretary of Preparedness and Response. Additionally, Dr. Galloway was Chair of the Executive Council of the Chicago Federal Executive Board and the Chair of the Federal and Military Medicine Caucus of the American Medical Association.

Galloway was selected by the United States Surgeon General as the Governor for the American College of Cardiology to represent the United States Public Health Service and was subsequently elected as the ACC Governor for Arizona. In that capacity, Galloway has worked with the American Diabetes Association in the “Make The Link” Program, an educational and public health approach focusing on the link between diabetes and heart disease. For this, he received the national American Diabetes Association’s C. Everett Koop Award for Health Promotion and Awareness on behalf of the American College of Cardiology.

Galloway's other honors include the HHS Secretary's Medallion for outstanding work in Strengthening Pandemic Influenza Preparedness within the United States, an Award for Dedication to Global Public Health from Taiwan as well as the Secretary's Award for Innovative Leadership.
