= Theodore Sedgwick (diplomat) =

American diplomat and businessman

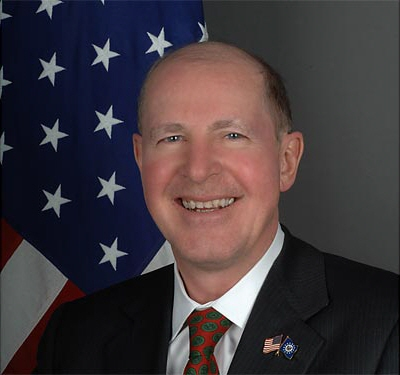
- Other name: Tod Sedgwick
- Occupation: US Ambassador to the Slovak Republic

Theodore "Tod" Sedgwick is the former US Ambassador to the Slovak Republic from 2010 to 2015 and President and CEO of Sedgwick Publishing Co. (1987–2010). Since 2015, he is a Fellow at the Transatlantic Center at The Johns Hopkins School of Advanced International Study and a Senior Fellow at the Center for the Study of the Presidency and Congress.

While CEO of Sedgwick Publishing, he was also President and CEO of Red Hills Lumber Co. (2000 to 2008) and Director of Sedgwick Land Company (1992 to 1998). Sedgwick founded IO Energy and served as its Chairman from 2001 to 2004. He was CEO of Pasha Publications, another company he founded, from 1978 to 1998.

On June 3, 2016, President Barack Obama appointed Sedgwick Commissioner to the United States World War One Centennial Commission.

== Education ==
Sedgwick received an A.B. from Harvard College.

== Family ==
Sedgwick’s great-great-grandfather is Theodore Sedgwick (1746-1813), a member of the Continental Congress who served in the U.S. Senate, and was the fourth Speaker of the U.S. House of Representatives. Ellery Sedgwick Sr., his grandfather, was editor and publisher of Atlantic Monthly magazine. Ellery Sedgwick Jr., his father, was a naval intelligence officer during the D-Day invasion and his uncle, William Ross Bond, was a brigadier general who was killed in the Vietnam War. William Ellery, an original signer of the Declaration of Independence, is another ancestor.
