= HSARPA =

Agency of the US Department of Homeland Security

Homeland Security Advanced Research Projects Agency (HSARPA) is a part of the Science and Technology Directorate at the United States Department of Homeland Security. Much like DARPA in the Department of Defense, HSARPA is tasked with advanced projects to advance the technology needed to protect the US. Some of the chief beneficiaries of HSARPA are the Customs and Border Protection, and the Office of Intelligence and Analysis.

HSARPA manages a broad portfolio of solicitations and proposals for the development of homeland security technology. HSARPA performs this function in part by awarding procurement contracts, grants, cooperative agreements, or other transactions for research or prototypes to public or private entities, businesses, federally funded research and development centers, and universities. HSARPA invests in programs offering the potential for revolutionary changes in technologies that promote homeland security. It also accelerates the prototyping and deployment of technologies intended to reduce homeland vulnerabilities.

HSARPA is divided into 5 main divisions: the Borders and Maritime Security Division, Chemical and Biological Defense Division, Cyber Security Division, Explosives Division, and the Resilient Systems Division.

== See also ==
- Advanced Research Projects Agency–Energy (ARPA-E)
- Advanced Research Projects Agency for Health (ARPA-H)
- Advanced Research Projects Agency–Infrastructure (ARPA-I)
- Defense Advanced Research Projects Agency (DARPA)
- Intelligence Advanced Research Projects Activity (IARPA)
