= Kurt Jetta =

American consumer researcher

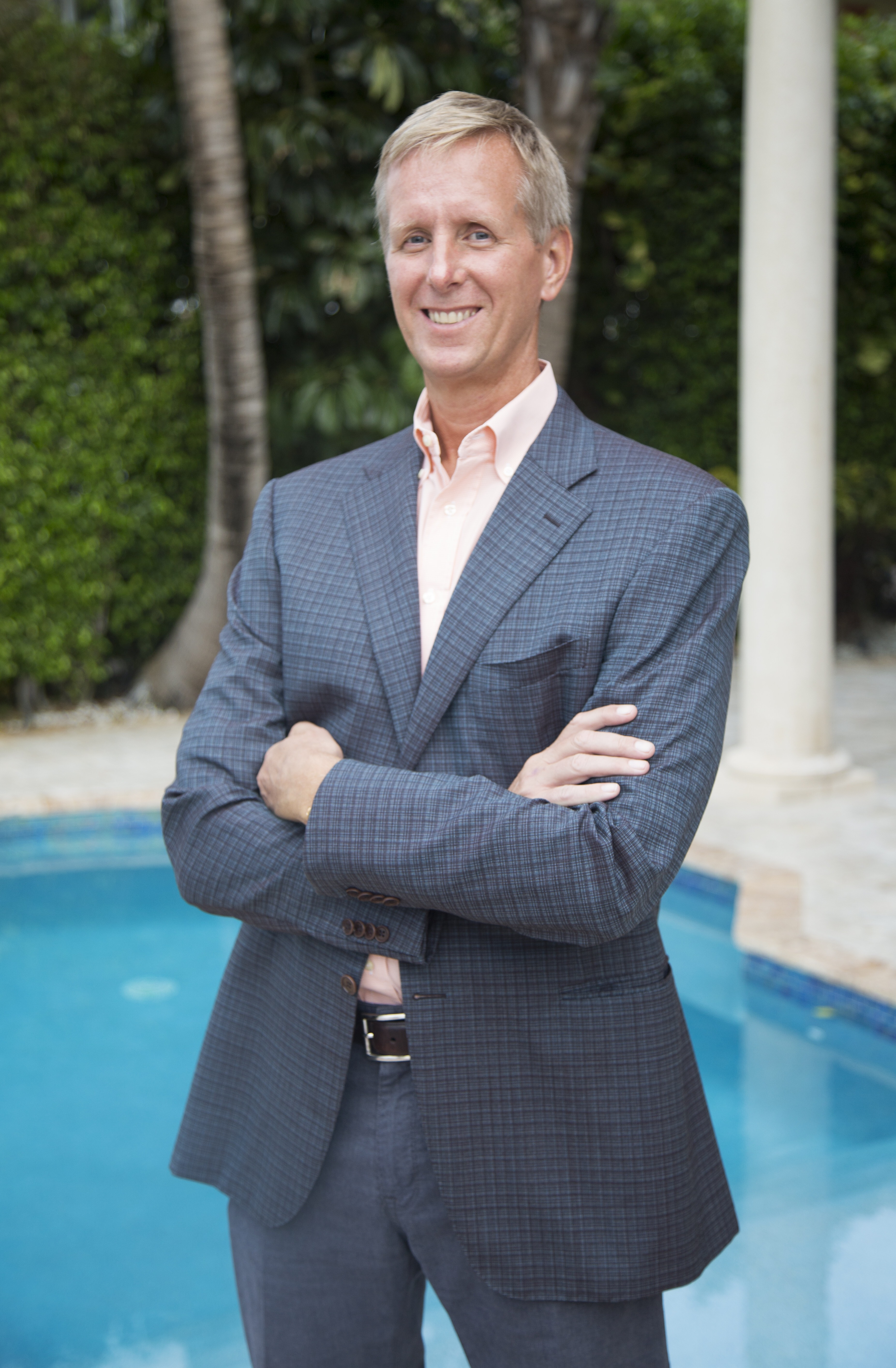
- Kurt Jetta, founder and CEO of TABS Analytics, circa 2020s
- Born: July 21, 1961 (age 65)
- Education: Fordham University, Duke University, North Carolina State University
- Occupation: Consumer Analyst
- Years active: 1998–present

Kurt Jetta (born 21 July 1961) is a consumer researcher who studies data about multinational corporations through his firm, TABS Analytics, which is based in Shelton, Connecticut. The corporations Jetta has analyzed include Amazon, Family Dollar, Dollar Tree, Walmart, Apple. In addition, Jetta has also studied the organic food industry, the vitamin industry, and the online grocery industry. Other investigations led by Jetta include sociological research that pertains to the purchasing habits of various ethnic groups. In the area of trade promotion, Jetta has developed an alternative methodology to current industry baseline models. Jetta also analyzes rewards programs. He was a 2017 Republican candidate in Florida’s 21st Congressional District.

== Career ==
Between 1996 and 1998 he held a position as Chief Executive Officer of Binky-Griptight, Inc. Binky-Griptight is a supplier of infant products. Prior to Binky-Griptight, Jetta spent seven years at Playtex Products.

In 1998, Jetta founded TABS Group, where he is the Chief Executive Officer and Lead Product Developer. TABS Group provides marketing analysis for clients in the Consumer Products industry. Additionally, he serves as an independent Director for JM Global Holding, Co. Work by Jetta and TABS has been quoted in The New York Times, Forbes, Bloomberg, and other national media.

== Consumer trends ==
Between 2009 and 2012, Jetta sampled 1,000 individuals who were aged 18–75 in order to study "their buying habits when it comes to organic products." Kurt Jetta's research, with regard to the organic food industry, suggests that the "percentage of people who buy organic products has stayed virtually the same for the past few years," at the 38-39% range. The study found that "Fresh Fruits continues to be the highest penetration category for Organics with 27% of consumers. This is followed by Fresh Vegetables (26%), Eggs (17%), Milk (16%), Chicken (13%), Skincare (7%), Red Meat (6%), Frozen Vegetables (6%), Haircare (5%), Frozen Fruit (4%), Ice Cream (4%), and Cosmetics (3%). Skincare and Haircare are the only two categories that registered consecutive years of annual gains, while Milk and Ice Cream showed declines in consecutive years." Jetta and his firm have also found that due to negative studies concerning multivitamins, the vitamin industry saw an "overall lethargy" in 2014.

Jetta has stated that "The most important thing that data is used for is to determine which products consumers prefer, and to make sure what's on the shelf is what they want to buy...For example, we're doing one project for a retail chain where we found that in areas with high African-American populations, not only do they buy African-American hair care products and cosmetics specifically, but they buy grooming products in general at a very high level. With that kind of information, the retailer can make sure all those products are stocked and available for them."

In early 2016, Jetta criticized the consumer packaged goods industry for stalling their own growth. His work, covered by both Wells Fargo and Food Navigator USA, showed that the consumer packaged goods industry focuses too much on less effective promotional tactics such as retailer loyalty programs and marketing to millennials at the expense of doing more traditional consumer trade promotion. He has also published opinion articles on the topic.

Also in 2016, Jetta’s research on online purchasing of baby goods by consumers received press when the study revealed that baby products are the largest online market of any of the consumer packaged goods categories studied.

Jetta began commenting on the online grocery business in 2016. After a TABS study found that fewer consumers purchased groceries online in 2016 than in 2015, he reported that “online grocery is failing,” and that Amazon would have difficulty breaking into grocery business because consumers enjoy grocery shopping in brick and mortar stores. When Amazon announced its intent to purchase Whole Foods in June 2017, Jetta’s research and commentary was quoted in Bloomberg and The Denver Post, and he was interviewed on NPR.

== Corporation analyses ==
In July 2014, after Dollar Tree announced its acquisition bid of Family Dollar, USA Today shared Kurt Jetta's prediction that the merger would affect the entire economic sector shared by companies such as Walmart. Jetta's TABS Group formed a "senior-level team dedicated to supporting internal and customer-related initiatives with Walmart" and researched the methodology that enables this corporation to operate "on a chain and local level." Tying in with his consumer research related to the organic food industry, Jetta et al. found that Walmart suffered in some areas after it "jumped on the organic bandwagon a little too soon".

He also reviewed Walmart’s change in practice of charging almost all their vendors a stocking fee. Formally the corporation charged these fees sporadically. While a common practice among other retailers, Jetta notes that the change for Walmart, " suggests that they are seeking areas to offset their increased investment in wages, as well as offset their lack of organic revenue growth."

When Ahold NV and Delhaise Group merged to become one of the largest supper market chains in the United States, Jetta noted his approval of the $560 million in savings the companies will incur after just 3 years, was “vital in a flat market.”

Jetta also shared his insights about Apple Stores' EasyPay innovation in Macworld, after a court case was pending about Eric Shine who "was accused of trying to walk out of the Apple Store on New York’s Fifth Avenue without paying for a pair of headphones" although Shine claims that "he did try to pay, using the mobile Apple Store app’s EasyPay option on his phone, but that the purchase didn’t go through." Jetta stated that 'when stores add customer-driven point of sale (POS) options like EasyPay, “in general, what happens is that there’s a fairly significant surge in sales” at first, due to the novelty of the new system. That’s then followed by some “shakeout of people that don’t like it for a lot of reasons—user difficulty, user error, and the like.”'

When grocery chain A&P filed for Chapter 11 bankruptcy in 2015, Jetta criticized the chain, calling the bankruptcy “a surprise to absolutely no one.” In 2015, Jetta estimated the US supplements industry at $11.8 billion, challenging Nutrition Business Journal’s estimate of over $35 billion as “vastly overstated.” His statements prompted a rebuttal from Nutrition Business Journal’s Editor-in-Chief and started an ongoing debate.

== Education ==
Jetta received his B.S. in Statistics in 1983 from North Carolina State University, where he served as Interfraternity Council President. In 1986, he earned his M.B.A. from The Fuqua School of Business at Duke University.

Nineteen years later, Jetta pursued his Ph.D. in Economics from Fordham University, where he graduated in 2008. His doctoral thesis was titled: A Theory of Retailer Price Promotion Using Economic Foundations: It’s All Incremental, with his central thesis being that the incremental sales generated on a promoted product is entirely incremental to the brand, category and promoting retailer. He published findings from his dissertation in the Journal of Centrum Cathedra and Journal of Research in Marketing.

== Political career ==
Jetta served several years on the Stamford Board of Representatives from 1987-1993. He ran an unsuccessful campaign for the Connecticut House of Representatives in 1988. In October 2017, Jetta declared himself as a Republican candidate for the U.S. House of Representative in Florida’s 21st Congressional District. One of his issues was increased federal focus on the opioid abuse.

== Personal life ==
Jetta has been married since 1989 to Nancy Jetta from Stamford, CT. He has three adult children.
