= List of After Words interviews first aired in 2009 =

After Words is an American television series on the C-SPAN2 network’s weekend programming schedule known as Book TV. The program is an hour-long talk show, each week featuring an interview with the author of a new nonfiction book. The program has no regular host. Instead, each author is paired with a guest host who is familiar with the author or the subject matter of their book.

| First air date (Links to video) | Interviewee(s) | Interviewer(s) | Book | Topic of interview / Comments |
|---|---|---|---|---|
| January 3, 2009 | Jay Parini | Sam Tanenhaus | Promised Land: Thirteen Books That Changed America | |
| January 11, 2009 | Christopher Horner | Jed Babbin | Red Hot Lies: How Global Warming Alarmists Use Threats, Fraud, and Deception to Keep You Misinformed | |
| January 18, 2009 | Robert Bork | Eugene Meyer | A Time to Speak: Selected Writings and Arguments | |
| January 24, 2009 | David Sanger | Bob Deans | The Inheritance: The World Obama Confronts and the Challenges to American Power | |
| January 31, 2009 | Gwen Ifill | David Brooks | The Breakthrough: Politics and Race in the Age of Obama | |
| February 7, 2009 | Bryan Burrough | Joe Barton | The Big Rich: The Rise and Fall of the Greatest Texas Oil Fortunes | H.L. Hunt, Roy Cullen, Sid Richardson, Clint Murchison |
| February 14, 2009 | Philip Howard | Joan Biskupic | Life Without Lawyers: Liberating Americans from Too Much Law | |
| February 21, 2009 | Roger L. Simon | Armstrong Williams | Blacklisting Myself: Memoir of a Hollywood Apostate in the Age of Terror | |
| February 28, 2009 | Azar Nafisi | Trita Parsi | Things I've Been Silent About: Memories | |
| March 14, 2009 | Ann Coulter | Michelle Easton | Guilty: Liberal "Victims" and Their Assault on America | |
| March 21, 2009 | Felix Rohatyn | Greg Ip | Bold Endeavors: How Our Government Built America, and Why It Must Rebuild Now | |
| April 4, 2009 | Ivan Eland | Ron Paul | Recarving Rushmore: Ranking the Presidents on Peace, Prosperity, and Liberty | |
| April 11, 2009 | Neal Bascomb | Elizabeth Holtzman | Hunting Eichmann: How a Band of Survivors and a Young Spy Agency Chased Down the World's Most Notorious Nazi | Adolf Eichmann, The Mossad |
| April 18, 2009 | Paul Escott | Jane Turner Censer | "What Shall We Do with the Negro?": Lincoln, White Racism, and Civil War America | |
| April 25, 2009 | Alan Beattie | Patrice Hill | False Economy: A Surprising Economic History of the World | Economic history of the world |
| May 2, 2009 | Liaquat Ahamed | Gerald Seib | Lords of Finance: The Bankers Who Broke the World | Benjamin Strong, Jr., Montagu Norman, 1st Baron Norman, Émile Moreau, Hjalmar Schacht |
| May 9, 2009 | Frederick Hitz | Peter Earnest | Why Spy?: Espionage in an Age of Uncertainty | |
| May 14, 2009 | William Cohan | Deborah Solomon | House of Cards: A Tale of Hubris and Wretched Excess on Wall Street | Bear Stearns |
| May 16, 2009 | Mark Rudd | Ishmael Reed | Underground: My Life with SDS and the Weathermen | Students for a Democratic Society, Weather Underground |
| May 23, 2009 | Elaine Showalter | Sara Nelson | A Jury of Her Peers: American Women Writers from Anne Bradstreet to Annie Proulx | |
| May 30, 2009 | Bethany Moreton | Nancy MacLean | To Serve God and Wal-Mart: The Making of Christian Free Enterprise | Wal-Mart |
| June 6, 2009 | Stan Greenberg | Mary Matalin | Dispatches from the War Room: In the Trenches with Five Extraordinary Leaders | Bill Clinton, Tony Blair, Ehud Barak, Gonzalo Sanchez de Lozada, Nelson Mandela |
| June 13, 2009 | Tierney Cahill | Eleanor Holmes Norton | Ms. Cahill for Congress: One Fearless Teacher, Her Sixth-Grade Class, and the Election That Changed Their Lives Forever | |
| June 20, 2009 | Eduardo Galeano | John Dinges | Mirrors: Stories of Almost Everyone | |
| June 29, 2009 | Nicholas Schmidle | Ralph Peters | To Live or to Perish Forever: Two Tumultuous Years in Pakistan | |
| July 4, 2009 | Wangari Maathai | Nicole Lee | The Challenge for Africa | |
| July 18, 2009 | Edward Humes | Matthew Kahn | Eco Barons: The Dreamers, Schemers, and Millionaires Who Are Saving Our Planet | |
| July 13, 2009 | Joe Scarborough | Peggy Noonan | The Last Best Hope: Restoring Conservatism and America's Promise | |
| July 25, 2009 | Harry Stein | Stefan Kanfer | "I Can't Believe I'm Sitting Next to a Republican:" A Survival Guide for Conservatives Marooned Among the Angry, Smug, and Terminally Self-Righteous | |
| August 1, 2009 | Mia Bay | Elsa Barkley Brown | To Tell the Truth Freely: The Life of Ida B. Wells | Ida B. Wells |
| August 10, 2009 | Ben Mezrich | A.J. Jacobs | The Accidental Billionaires: The Founding of Facebook -- A Tale of Sex, Money, Genius and Betrayal | Facebook |
| August 17, 2009 | Brian Jennings | Monica Crowley | Censorship: The Threat to Silence Talk Radio | |
| August 22, 2009 | John McCaslin | Keith Stroup | Weed Man: The Remarkable Journey of Jimmy Divine | |
| August 31, 2009 | Peter Carlson | Sergei Khrushchev | K Blows Top: A Cold War Comic Interlude, Starring Nikita Khrushchev, America's Most Unlikely Tourist | Nikita Khrushchev's 1959 visit to the United States |
| September 6, 2009 | Tony Zinni | Julius Becton | Leading the Charge: Leadership Lessons from the Battlefield to the Boardroom | |
| September 12, 2009 | Kathryn Olmsted | Barry Glassner | Real Enemies: Conspiracy Theories and American Democracy, World War I to 9/11 | |
| September 19, 2009 | Jon Krakauer | Sean Naylor | Where Men Win Glory: The Odyssey of Pat Tillman | Pat Tillman |
| September 28, 2009 | Kimberly Kagan | Pete Hegseth | The Surge: A Military History | Iraq War troop surge of 2007 |
| October 3, 2009 | Chris Hedges | Ron Suskind | Empire of Illusion: The End of Literacy and the Triumph of Spectacle | |
| October 10, 2009 | Tom Ridge | Mimi Hall | The Test of Our Times: America Under Siege and How We Can Be Safe Again | |
| October 24, 2009 | Michael Rosen | John Hope Byrant | What Else but Home: Seven Boys and an American Journey Between the Projects and the Penthouse | |
| October 25, 2009 | Taylor Branch | John Harris | The Clinton Tapes: Wrestling History with the President | Bill Clinton |
| November 1, 2009 | John Fleming | Amity Shlaes | The Anti-Communist Manifestos: Four Books That Shaped the Cold War | Victor Kravchenko, Jan Valtin, Whittaker Chambers, Arthur Koestler |
| November 7, 2009 | Harry MacLean | Richard Howorth | The Past Is Never Dead: The Trial of James Ford Seale and Mississippi's Struggle for Redemption | James Ford Seale |
| November 15, 2009 | Peter Schweizer | Michele Bachmann | Architects of Ruin: How Big Government Liberals Wrecked the Global Economy -- and How They Will Do It Again if No One Stops Them | |
| November 22, 2009 | Nomi Prins | Bernie Sanders | It Takes a Pillage: Behind the Bailouts, Bonuses, and Backroom Deals from Washington to Wall Street | 2008 financial crisis |
| November 29, 2009 | Wil Haygood | Dave Zirin | Sweet Thunder: The Life and Times of Sugar Ray Robinson | Sugar Ray Robinson |
| December 5, 2009 | Steven Levitt and Stephen Dubner | Ezra Klein | SuperFreakonomics: Global Cooling, Patriotic Prostitutes, and Why Suicide Bombers Should Buy Life Insurance | |
| December 14, 2009 | Joan Biskupic | Ted Olson | American Original: The Life and Constitution of Supreme Court Justice Antonin Scalia | Antonin Scalia |
| December 19, 2009 | Greg Mortenson | Mary Bono Mack | Stones into Schools | |
| December 26, 2009 | Jane Goodall | John Nielsen | Hope for Animals and Their World: How Endangered Species Are Being Rescued from the Brink | Endangered species |
