= America's Great Divide: From Obama to Trump =

2020 television documentary film

- Genre: Documentary
- Written by: Michael Kirk; Mike Wiser
- Directed by: Michael Kirk
- Narrated by: Will Lyman
- Music by: John E. Low
- Country of origin: United States
- Original language: English

Production
- Producers: Michael Kirk; Mike Wiser; Philip Bennett; Jim Gilmore; Gabrielle Schonder
- Cinematography: Ben McCoy
- Editors: Steve Audette; Elliott Choi
- Running time: 229 minutes
- Production companies: Frontline; Kirk Documentary Group

Original release
- Network: PBS
- Release: January 13, 2020

America's Great Divide: From Obama to Trump is a 2020 two-part television documentary film about the political divide between the United States Democratic and Republican Party in the early 21st century. Produced by the investigative journalism program Frontline on PBS, it charts how the two major political parties became increasingly adversarial to each other due to factors of race, media, and misinformation, from the 2008 presidential election to the presidency of Donald Trump. The film was directed by Michael Kirk and written by Kirk and Mike Wiser, and was first aired on PBS in two parts on January 13 and 14, 2020.

== Interviewees ==
- Yamiche Alcindor, PBS NewsHour
- David Axelrod, fmr. Obama chief strategist
- Matt Bai, author of The Argument
- Peter Baker, author of Obama: The Call of History, co-author of Kremlin Rising
- Dan Balz, The Washington Post
- Kurt Bardella, fmr. spokesman of Breitbart News
- Mark Barden, parent of Sandy Hook victim
- Steve Bannon, fmr. chmn. of Breitbart News
- Joe Biden, fmr. vice president
- John Boehner, fmr. speaker of the house
- Ronald Brownstein, author of The Second Civil War
- Rep. Eric Cantor, fmr. house minority whip, house majority leader
- Jelani Cobb, The New Yorker, author of The Substance of Hope
- Robert Costa, moderator of Washington Week
- Ann Coulter, author of Mugged and ¡Adios, America!
- William Daley, fmr. Obama chief of staff
- Robert Draper, The New York Times Magazine
- Michael Eric Dyson, author of The Black Presidency
- Marc Fisher, co-author of Trump Revealed
- Timothy Geithner, fmr. secretary of the treasury
- Rep. Newt Gingrich, fmr. speaker of the house
- Susan Glasser, co-author of Kremlin Rising
- Joshua Green, Bloomberg Businessweek, author of The Devil's Bargain
- Rep. Luis Gutiérrez, 1993–2019
- Rep. Tim Huelskamp, Tea Party congress (2011–19)
- Valerie Jarrett, fmr. Obama adviser
- Broderick Johnson, fmr. Obama adviser
- Megyn Kelly, fmr. Fox News anchor
- Michael Kranish, author of Trump Revealed
- Rep. Raúl Labrador, Tea Party congress (2011–19)
- Mark Leibovich, The New York Times Magazine
- Wesley Lowery, The Washington Post
- Frank Luntz, GOP pollster
- Alec MacGillis, ProPublica
- Omarosa Manigault, The Apprentice contestant
- Alex Marlow, Breitbart News editor-in-chief
- Cecilia Muñoz, fmr. Obama adviser
- Shailagh Murray, fmr. Obama adviser
- Sam Nunberg, fmr. Trump political adviser
- Norman Ornstein, American Enterprise Institute
- James Poniewozik, TV critic of The New York Times
- John Podesta, fmr. Obama adviser
- Robert Reich, secretary of labor (1993–97), author of Beyond Outrage
- David Remnick, editor of The New Yorker
- Ben Rhodes, fmr. Obama adviser
- Anthony Scaramucci, fmr. Trump campaign adviser
- Noam Scheiber, author of The Escape Artists
- Steve Schmidt, fmr. John McCain campaign adviser
- Gabriel Sherman, New York magazine (2008–17)
- Roger Stone, fmr. Trump political adviser
- Charlie Sykes, fmr. conservative radio host
- Katy Tur, NBC News
- David Wessel, author of In Fed We Trust
- Judy Woodruff, PBS NewsHour anchor

== Production ==
On December 20, 2019, Frontline announced that it will release the two-part television documentary titled America's Great Divide: From Obama to Trump on January 13 and 14, 2020, which will comprehensively examine "the growth of a toxic political environment that has paralyzed Washington and dramatically deepened the gulf between Americans", and provide context for the election year of 2020. Director Michael Kirk intended for the film to highlight the irony in Obama's promise to unify the country, "that by the end of his presidency -- he freely admitted and everyone else could see -- that the division was even deeper, even broader, that racism was even more rampant." A preview of the documentary was released on January 6, 2020.

== Release ==
America's Great Divide first aired on PBS in the United States on January 13 and 14, 2020. On the same day of the broadcast of "Part 2", both parts of the documentary film were made available by Frontline for streaming on YouTube without charge.

== Critical response ==
Brian Lowery of CNN praised America's Great Divide for "admirably" charting in detail the deepening division within the United States through the presidencies of Barack Obama and Donald Trump, stating that "The sobering takeaway from 'America's Great Divide,' explored at some length in the second half, is whether the nastiness that defines current political discourse is irrevocable. John Doyle of the Canadian newspaper The Globe and Mail also commended the documentary for its compelling presentation of the "central threads" which led to the election of Trump, stating that it is "sobering, at times unnerving and often startling."
