= Rick Tyler =

Failed political candidate

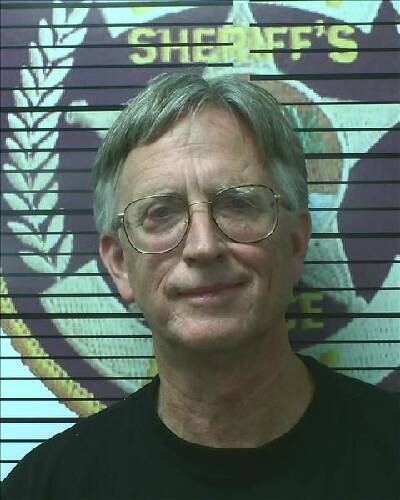
- Richard Tyler Jr., July 7, 2020 mug shot
- Born: Richard Seburn Tyler, Jr. October 10, 1957 (age 69); Miami, Florida, United States
- Known for: White nationalism
- Political party: Independent (before 2019); American Freedom Party (2019 - present)

Richard Seburn Tyler Jr. (born October 10, 1957) is a perennial political candidate from Tennessee. Tyler first attracted significant media attention in 2016 when he erected a billboard that read "Make America White Again" when running for the United States House of Representatives as an independent. He has unsuccessfully run for multiple offices since 2010, and announced that he would run for president in 2020 on the American Freedom Party ticket.

== Early life ==
Rick Tyler was born on October 10, 1957, in Miami, Florida, the youngest of three children of Richard Seburn "Dick" Tyler (1926-2020) and Felecie Chapin Tyler. His parents were raised in Nashville during the 1930s and 1940s. Tyler's father served in the U.S. Navy during World War II and attended the University of Tennessee on the G.I. Bill where he received an engineering degree from the University of Tennessee. He worked for 37 years with Florida Power and Light. Tyler describes his upbringing as "solidly middle class and conservatively traditional."

Tyler claims that he became a Christian on July 4, 1979. He states that he moved from Miami to Rock Hill, South Carolina in 1981 to become the operations manager of a Belk department store. He states that he then moved to Fort Myers, Florida, in 1983.

== Political campaigns ==
Rick Tyler ran for U.S. Senate as an independent in Florida in 2010, and received 7,394 votes, or 0.14% of all votes cast. The seat was won by Republican Marco Rubio. Tyler ran for U.S. Senate in Tennessee in 2014, again as an independent, and received 5,759 votes, or 0.42% of all of the votes cast.

Rick Tyler ran as an independent in Tennessee's 3rd congressional district in 2016, a seat which has been held by Republican Chuck Fleischmann since 2011. During his campaign, Tyler erected a billboard that said "Make America White Again" along U.S. Route 411 near Ocoee, Tennessee, an unincorporated community in Polk County. This sign attracted national media attention and controversy, and was condemned by many. The billboard, as well as Tyler's views, also received attention from the Southern Poverty Law Center. The billboard, which was removed shortly thereafter, was a pun on Donald Trump's 2016 campaign slogan "Make America Great Again." Another billboard included the words "I Have A Dream" next to a picture of the White House surrounded by Confederate flags. Tyler claimed that the billboard was not intended to be racist, and that he has no hatred or dislike for racial and ethnic minorities, but rather believes that the United States should remain majority white. He claimed that the purpose of the billboard was a reflection of his desire for the United States to return to the "1960s, Ozzie and Harriet, Leave it to Beaver time when there were no break-ins, no violent crime, no mass immigration." Tyler also cited Ann Coulter and her book Adios, America as helping to influence his white nationalist views. Tyler also announced plans for other billboards, including one that would say, "Mama's, don't let your babies grow up to be miscegenators". Tyler cited Donald Trump as an inspiration, but also criticized him as a "stalking horse entity".

In the general election, Tyler received 5,098 votes, or 1.9% of the total number of votes cast. Tyler ran for the same seat in 2018, and received 4,522 votes, or 1.84% of the total number of votes cast.

On May 28, 2019, Rick Tyler spoke at the University of Tennessee in Knoxville. The event was heavily condemned, and protesters reportedly outnumbered attendees 10 to one. During the event, Tyler announced that he is running for President in 2020 on the ticket of the American Freedom Party, a group which advocates for white nationalism.

Tyler ran for a 3rd time as an independent in Tennessee's 3rd congressional district in 2022 and received 1,736 votes, or 0.8% of the total number of votes cast.

=== Other activities ===
In the 1990s, Tyler was pastor of the Church of the Remnant in Epworth, Georgia, and hosted a shortwave radio program called the "Voice of Liberty" on WWCR in Nashville, Tennessee. The program, which is reported to have been used for white supremacist and antisemitic rants, was also reported to have promoted conspiracy theories. Tyler is also reported to have run groups called the Voice of Liberty Patriots and the Georgia Taxpayer's Association.

In 2019, in an interview with The Political Cesspool, Tyler told host James Edwards of a desire to turn Polk County into a "whitopia" and a "virtually all-white county." He also described Polk County, which already has a population that is approximately 97.5% white, as having a reputation "for being the most racially-minded county in the state, historically."

== Legal issues ==
In July 2020, Tyler was arrested and charged with tax evasion and property theft after an investigation by the Tennessee Department of Revenue. The indictment states that Tyler knowingly refused to withhold and pay approximately $38,000 in sales taxes between April 1, 2015, and March 31, 2016. It was also reported at the same time that Tyler's former landlord is suing him for unpaid rent.

On May 12, 2022, Tyler pleaded guilty and was sentenced to two years of supervised probation, to be converted to unsupervised probation upon full payment of the restitution amount of $38,224.90.

== Views and ideology ==
=== Racial views ===
Tyler holds that white people are superior to people of other races. Tyler has expressed a belief on multiple occasions that white people should remain the super-majority racial group in the U.S., and a desire for the country to return to 1960s-era demographics. Tyler blames immigration policies enacted in the 1960s, such as the Immigration and Nationality Act of 1965, for the changes in the demography of the United States, and supports a return to pre-1960s immigration policies, as well as deporting the millions of illegal immigrants currently residing in the United States, ending policies that he claims subsidize minority birth rates, securing the southern border of the US, and encouraging mass immigration from majority white countries. Tyler is also opposed to interracial marriages.

=== Other views ===
Tyler self-identifies as conservative. He supports Second Amendment rights and believes that any attempt by the government to regulate guns is a criminal act. He is opposed to abortion and believes that God is punishing the U.S. for legalizing the procedure. Tyler believes that income taxes are unconstitutional and claims that the source of the progressive income tax is the Communist Manifesto. Tyler opposes the Federal Reserve and public schools. He opposes same sex marriage and believes that homosexuality is a sin. He opposes the war on terror and the Patriot Act, and claims that the war on terror is a distraction technique to keep the US southern border open and enter the US into a New World Order. Tyler has also expressed belief in 9/11 conspiracy theories and believes that the events of September 11, 2001, should be re-investigated to determine what really happened. He has expressed opposition to the Council on Foreign Relations and the Department of Homeland Security and believes that individual states should have the right to secede from the union.

== Personal life ==
Tyler owned the former Whitewater Grill in Ocoee, Tennessee, which closed in 2018 when he was evicted. After his congressional campaign and beliefs became public knowledge, locals began boycotting the restaurant.
