= Resistance Is Futile =

Resistance Is Futile may refer to:

- Resistance Is Futile (Oh Hiroshima), a 2012 studio album by Oh Hiroshima
- Resistance Is Futile (album), a 2018 studio album by the Manic Street Preachers
- Resistance Is Futile!, a 2018 book by Ann Coulter
- "Resistance is futile", a phrase spoken in the 1977 episode "The Dorcons" of the TV show Space: 1999
- "Resistance Is Futile" (Dexter), a 2007 broadcast episode of Dexter
- "Resistance is futile", a phrase uttered by the Borg in Star Trek
- "Resistance is Futile", a song on the 1998 Jets to Brazil album "Orange Rhyming Dictionary"
- "Resistance is futile!", the Vogons' battle cry and counter-argument to dissent in Douglas Adams's novel The Hitchhiker's Guide to the Galaxy
