= In Trump We Trust =

2016 book by Ann Coulter

In Trump We Trust: E Pluribus Awesome!
- Author: Ann Coulter
- Language: English
- Subject: Donald Trump
- Publisher: Sentinel
- Publication date: August 2016
- Publication place: United States
- Media type: Print
- ISBN: 978-0-7352-1446-0

In Trump We Trust: E Pluribus Awesome! is a 2016 book by American conservative commentator and author Ann Coulter in support of Donald Trump and his 2016 campaign for the presidency of the United States. The e-book was a New York Times bestseller in September 2016.
