= How to Talk to a Liberal (If You Must) =

2004 book by Ann Coulter

How to Talk to a Liberal (If You Must): The World According to Ann Coulter
- Author: Ann Coulter
- Language: English
- Subject: Politics of the United States
- Publisher: Crown Forum
- Publication date: October 5, 2004
- Publication place: United States
- Media type: Print (Hardback & Paperback)
- Pages: 368 pp
- ISBN: 1-4000-5418-4
- OCLC: 55746549
- Dewey Decimal: 320.51/3/0973 22
- LC Class: JC574.2.U6 C67 2004

How to Talk to a Liberal (If You Must) is a 2004 book by Ann Coulter. The book is a collection of columns written by Coulter on liberalism, the war on terror, and the media.

In it, Coulter offers advice gleaned from her experience as a political pundit. She attacks The New York Times and the Democratic Party, and sums up her opinion of liberals in two sentences: "Want to make liberals angry? Defend the United States." In arguing with liberals, she advises, "don't be defensive", "always outrage the enemy", and "never apologize to, compliment, or show graciousness to a Democrat".

The book was on the New York Times Best Seller list for 17 weeks.
