= Godless: The Church of Liberalism =

2006 book by Ann Coulter

- Cover
- Author: Ann Coulter
- Language: English
- Subject: Liberalism in the United States
- Publisher: Crown Forum
- Publication date: June 7, 2006
- Publication place: United States
- Media type: Print
- ISBN: 1-4000-5420-6
- OCLC: 69594152
- Dewey Decimal: 320.51/30973 22
- LC Class: JC574.2.U6 C667 2006b

Godless: The Church of Liberalism is a book by best-selling author and American far-right columnist Ann Coulter, published in 2006. The book is an argument against American liberalism, which Coulter claims is anti-scientific, faith-based, comparing it with primitive religion, purported to have "its own cosmology, its own explanation for why we are here, its own gods, and its own clergy." Coulter argues that "the basic tenet of liberalism is that nature is god and men are monkeys."

The book drew criticism for its statements on the Jersey Girls, alleged plagiarized content, the promotion of pseudoscientific intelligent design, its incoherence, and its factual inaccuracy.

== The 9/11 "Jersey Girls" ==
Throughout the book, Coulter criticizes the four 9/11 widows, known as the "Jersey Girls", who helped push for the 9/11 Commission and have been critical of US security policies, writing:

These broads are millionaires, lionized on TV and in articles about them, reveling in their status as celebrities and stalked by grief-arazzis. These self-obsessed women seemed genuinely unaware that 9/11 was an attack on our nation and acted as if the terrorist attacks happened only to them. ... I've never seen people enjoying their husbands' deaths so much ... the Democrat ratpack gals endorsed John Kerry for president ... cutting campaign commercials ... how do we know their husbands weren't planning to divorce these harpies? Now that their shelf life is dwindling, they'd better hurry up and appear in Playboy.

These statements received national attention after an interview on The Today Show, and were widely criticized. Coulter refused to apologize, and responded, "I feel sorry for all the widows of 9/11 ... [but] I do not believe that sanctifies their political message ... They have attacked Bush, they have attacked Condoleezza Rice, they're cutting campaign commercials for Kerry. But we can't respond because their husbands died ... I think it's one of the ugliest things 'the left' has done ... this idea that you need some sort of personal authenticity in order to make a political point ..."

Also on June 8, New Jersey Assemblywomen Joan M. Quigley and Linda Stender issued a joint press release, calling on "... New Jersey retailers to ban the sale of her book throughout the state."

== Jews ==
Christopher Hitchens noted that Coulter implied neoconservatives and Jews are one and the same:

If liberals are on Red Alert with one born-again Christian in the cabinet of a Christian president, imagine how they would react if there were five. Between 25 and 45 percent of the population calls itself "born-again" or "evangelical" Christian. Jews make up less than 2 per cent of the nation's population, and yet [Bill] Clinton had five in his cabinet. He appointed two to the Supreme Court. Now guess which administration is called a neoconservative conspiracy?

== Science and intelligent design ==
Coulter's reliance on intelligent design and creationist sources for science, has prompted some critics of the intelligent design movement to analyze her claims. Biologist P. Z. Myers, countering Coulter's claim that there is no evidence for the theory of evolution, points to the scientific literature that contains hundreds of thousands, possibly millions, of articles about various aspects of evolution. He also argues that Coulter has it backwards: The issue is not whether there is evidence that supports evolution theory, but whether there is evidence that is explained by evolution theory, since scientific theories are explanations for data. In response to Coulter's citing of Jonathan Wells' arguments concerning peppered moth evolution, Ian Musgrave argues that Coulter misrepresents the significance of the peppered moth experiments, makes a number of factual errors, and gives a "wildly ignorant misrepresentation of evolution." James Downard criticized Coulter's favoring of secondary sources over primary sources, saying "she compulsively reads inaccurate antievolutionary sources and accepts them on account of their reinforcement of what she wants to be true."

Media Matters for America responded to Coulter's strawman arguments against evolution by noting 11 types of distortions in her writing and going into detail explaining why her claims are false, pseudoscientific and contrary to science. A satirical account of Coulter's take on evolution was written by probabilist Peter Olofsson, whose tongue-in-cheek argument was that Coulter had in fact written a veiled criticism of the intelligent design movement, much like Alan Sokal did to the postmodern movement in his famous hoax.

== Reception ==
Christopher Hitchens, in a critical review of Godless for The Liberal, pointed to the book's incoherent prose and factual inaccuracy.

John Barrie, creator of iParadigms, LLC's plagiarism-detection software, found in the book three instances of what he claims to be plagiarism. The Rawstory website claims that she used text taken from the Illinois Right to Life website, making only slight changes for the book. The TPM Muckraker website provided a "complete" list of examples of alleged plagiarism discovered so far in all of Coulter's works. Coulter's publisher Crown Publishing Group has since characterized the charges as being "as trivial and meritless as they are irresponsible."

== See also ==
- Secular religion
