= High Crimes and Misdemeanors: The Case Against Bill Clinton =

1998 book by Ann Coulter

- Cover of the first edition
- Authors: Ann Coulter
- Language: English
- Subject: Bill Clinton
- Publisher: Regnery Publishing
- Publication date: 1998
- Publication place: United States
- Media type: Print (Hardcover and Paperback)
- Pages: 358
- ISBN: 0-89526-113-8
- OCLC: 54883679

High Crimes and Misdemeanors: The Case Against Bill Clinton is a 1998 book about Bill Clinton by American conservative media commentator Ann Coulter. It was published by Regnery Publishing.

== Summary ==
The book has sections on what the author states was President Bill Clinton's womanizing at government expense and what she states were his lies (under oath) to cover up his actions. Coulter also writes about some of the other controversies surrounding Bill Clinton's presidency, including Monica Lewinsky, Paula Jones, Whitewater, Travelgate, Filegate, Wampumgate, the China secrets scandal, and the suicide of Vince Foster. In the last chapter, she reviews the history of the impeachment process and makes a case for Clinton's impeachment.

== Publication history ==
High Crimes and Misdemeanors was first published in hardcover by Regnery Publishing in 1998. A paperback edition followed in 2002.

== See also ==
- Impeachment of Bill Clinton
