= Jane Turner Censer =

Historian of the American South and women

Jane Turner Censer is a professor emeritus of history and an author in the United States. She has written about Southern women and authored a book about Amélie Rives. She appeared on C-SPAN discussing the book and also joined Paul D. Escott to discuss his work on Abraham Lincoln and enslaved African Americans.

Censer graduated from Johns Hopkins University and was a National Humanities Center Fellow in 1983 and 1984. She was a professor at George Mason University.

She edited and wrote an introduction for Sherwood Bonner's feminist novel Like unto Like.

== Writings ==
- North Carolina Planters and Their Children, 1800‑1860 Louisiana State University Press (1984)
- The Reconstruction of White Southern Womanhood, 1865-1895 (2003)
- The Princess of Albemarle: Amélie Rives, Author and Celebrity at the Fin de Siècle University of Virginia Press (2022)
