= Slander: Liberal Lies About the American Right =

2002 book by Ann Coulter

- Author: Ann Coulter
- Language: English
- Subject: Media bias in the United States
- Publisher: Three Rivers Press
- Publication date: June 25, 2002
- Publication place: United States
- Media type: Print
- Pages: 272
- ISBN: 1-4000-4952-0
- OCLC: 53167884
- Dewey Decimal: 320.52/0973 21
- LC Class: JC574.2.U6 C68 2002b

Slander: Liberal Lies About the American Right is a 2002 book by conservative columnist Ann Coulter criticizing "the left's hegemonic control of the news media". The book was a #1 New York Times best seller in 2002, holding the #1 spot for eight weeks.

== Comments about the New York Times ==
In an interview with George Gurley of the New York Observer shortly after the publication of Slander, it was mentioned that Coulter actually had friends and acquaintances who worked for the Times, namely restaurant critic Frank Bruni and correspondent David E. Sanger. Later in the interview, she expressed amusement at her recollections of the Times' gratuitousness in publishing two photos of George H. W. Bush throwing up at a diplomatic meeting in Japan, then said, "Is your tape recorder running? Turn it on! I got something to say...My only regret with Timothy McVeigh is he did not go to the New York Times Building." Gurley told her to be careful, to which she responded, "You're right, after 9/11 I shouldn't say that."

When asked by John Hawkins, the web manager of a right-wing blog, through a pre-written set of interview questions if she regretted the statement, Coulter replied by saying, "Of course I regret it. I should have added, 'after everyone had left the building except the editors and reporters.'" Lee Salem, the president of Universal Press Syndicate, which distributes Coulter's column, later defended Coulter by characterizing her comments as satire.

The subject came up again when Coulter appeared on the Fox News program Hannity & Colmes. Alan Colmes mentioned Salem's claim, and said to her that remarks like saying "Timothy McVeigh should have bombed The New York Times building" were "laughable happy satires, right?" He then said that Coulter was "actually a liberal who is doing this to mock and parody the way conservatives think." She replied, "Well, it's not working very well if that were my goal. No, I think the Timothy McVeigh line was merely prescient after The New York Times has leaped beyond—beyond nonsense straight into treason, last week". She was referring to a Times report that revealed classified information about an anti-terrorism program of the U.S. government involving surveillance of international financial transactions of persons suspected of having Al-Qaida links. Colmes continued in the same vein when he responded, calling her remarks "great humor", and that it "belongs on Saturday Night Live. It belongs on The Daily Show."

== New York Times' NASCAR coverage ==
In the first edition of this book, Coulter incorrectly alleged that The New York Times did not cover NASCAR driver Dale Earnhardt's death until two days after he died:

The day after seven-time NASCAR Winston Cup champion Dale Earnhardt died in a race at the Daytona 500, almost every newspaper in America carried the story on the front page. Stock-car racing had been the nation's fastest-growing sport for a decade, and NASCAR the second-most-watched sport behind the NFL. More Americans recognize the name Dale Earnhardt than, say, Maureen Dowd (Manhattan liberals are dumbly blinking at that last sentence). It took The New York Times two days to deem Earnhardt's death sufficiently important to mention it on the first page. Demonstrating the left's renowned populist touch, the article began, "His death brought a silence to the Wal-Mart." The Times went on to report that in vast swaths of the country people watch stock-car racing. Tacky people were mourning Dale Earnhardt all over the South!

The New York Times did, in fact, cover Earnhardt's death the same day that he died: sportswriter Robert Lipsyte authored an article for the front page that was published on February 18, 2001. Another front page article appeared in the Times on the following day. Coulter cited an article indeed written two days after Earnhardt's death—Rick Bragg, a Pulitzer Prize winner who grew up in the South, wrote a personal piece on Earnhardt and his passing—bringing the total to three days in a row in which the Times covered Earnhardt's death on its front page. The paper also ran a prominent story about Earnhardt before his death.

Coulter responded to this widely publicized error as follows:

In my three best-selling books—making the case for a president's impeachment, accusing liberals of systematic lying and propagandizing, arguing that Joe McCarthy was a great American patriot, and detailing 50 years of treachery by the Democratic Party—this is the only vaguely substantive error the Ann Coulter hysterics have been able to produce, corrected soon after publication. CONGRATULATIONS, LIBERALS!!! At least I didn't miss the Ukrainian famine (cf., Pulitzer Prize-winning New York Times reporter Walter Duranty).

Coulter corrected the error in the paperback edition of her book.
