= K Blows Top =

American historical non-fiction book

K Blows Top: A Cold War Comic Interlude, Starring Nikita Khrushchev, America's Most Unlikely Tourist
- Author: Peter Carlson
- Language: English
- Genre: History
- Publisher: PublicAffairs
- Publication date: 2009
- Publication place: United States
- Media type: Print (hardcover and paperback)
- ISBN: 978-1-58648-497-2

K Blows Top: A Cold War Comic Interlude, Starring Nikita Khrushchev, America's Most Unlikely Tourist (2009) is a book by Peter Carlson published by PublicAffairs describing the 1959 state visit by Nikita Khrushchev to the United States.

== Synopsis ==
The book covers Nikita Khrushchev's visit to the United States, which took him to New York City, Los Angeles, San Francisco, Iowa, Pittsburgh, Pennsylvania, and Washington, D.C., and included visits to 20th Century Fox, the Mark Hopkins Hotel, an Iowa farm, a Pittsburgh steel mill, and Camp David. Highlights included meeting Shirley MacLaine and Frank Sinatra on the set of Can-Can, visiting a Quality Foods supermarket in San Francisco, and meeting Harry Bridges, fiery labor leader, movie star Marilyn Monroe, and hostess Perle Mesta, among many other Americans, famous and not-so-famous.

The title comes from a New York Daily News headline about Khrushchev's reaction when he was refused admission to Disneyland.

== Film adaptation ==
In 2013, the story was in pre-production as a made-for-television movie to be produced by Tom Hanks and starring Paul Giamatti.
