= Elizabeth Booker Houston =

American lawyer, public health professional, and comedian

- Citizenship: United States
- Education: Christian Brothers University (BA psychology); University of Memphis (JD and MPH)
- Occupations: Comedian, lawyer

Elizabeth Booker Houston is an American lawyer, public health professional, stand-up comedian, and political commentator. She gained national attention for blending legal analysis with satire and her viral rebuke of conservative pundit Ann Coulter at the 2024 Democratic National Convention.

== Early life and education ==
Elizabeth Booker Houston, along with her family, lived in Memphis, Tennessee. Houston's brother, Jonathan Booker, an innocent bystander, was killed in the crossfire of a December 2017 shooting in Memphis's Edge District. Houston and family had been gathering evidence, and Houston asked TikTok for help with the cold case in 2021, four years after the event.

Houston earned a BA in psychology from Christian Brothers University and later received a JD and MPH from the University of Memphis.

== Career ==
=== Legal and public health ===
As of 2024, Houston works within the U.S. Food and Drug Administration in regulatory compliance.

=== Comedy ===
Houston performs stand-up comedy in Washington, D.C., where she integrates legal insight into political satire. She has appeared at DC Improv, Magooby's Joke House, New York Comedy Club, and has opened for D.L. Hughley.

Her comedic style has been described in the Daily Beast as sharp, irreverent, and informative—leveraging viral moments to spark broader civic and legal discussion.

=== Social media and public commentary ===
On TikTok and X (formerly Twitter), Houston posts under @bookersquared, offering legal explainers and political commentary. By mid-2024, Houston had more than 250,000 followers on Instagram. ABC News noted her combined social media following exceeded 500,000, recognizing her as a credentialed "social justice influencer" during the 2024 Democratic National Convention.

In August 2024, she delivered a viral monologue at the Democratic National Convention, during which she called Ann Coulter a "childless monkey." The clip went viral on TikTok and X, boosting her visibility and drawing media attention.

As of April 2025, she had over 437,000 Instagram followers and 372,500 TikTok followers. In August 2025, Wired reported that Houston was among several Democratic-leaning influencers linked to the Chorus Creator Incubator Program, which is funded by the Sixteen Thirty Fund, a liberal "dark money" group. According to contracts obtained by Wired, participants were required to route bookings with lawmakers or political leaders through Chorus, seek written approval before using program resources for political content, and avoid disclosing the identity of their funders. The agreements further gave Chorus discretion to demand removal or correction of content produced at Chorus-organized events. Houston did not respond to Wired’s requests for comment.
