= State visit by Nikita Khrushchev to the United States =

1959 state visit of a Soviet leader

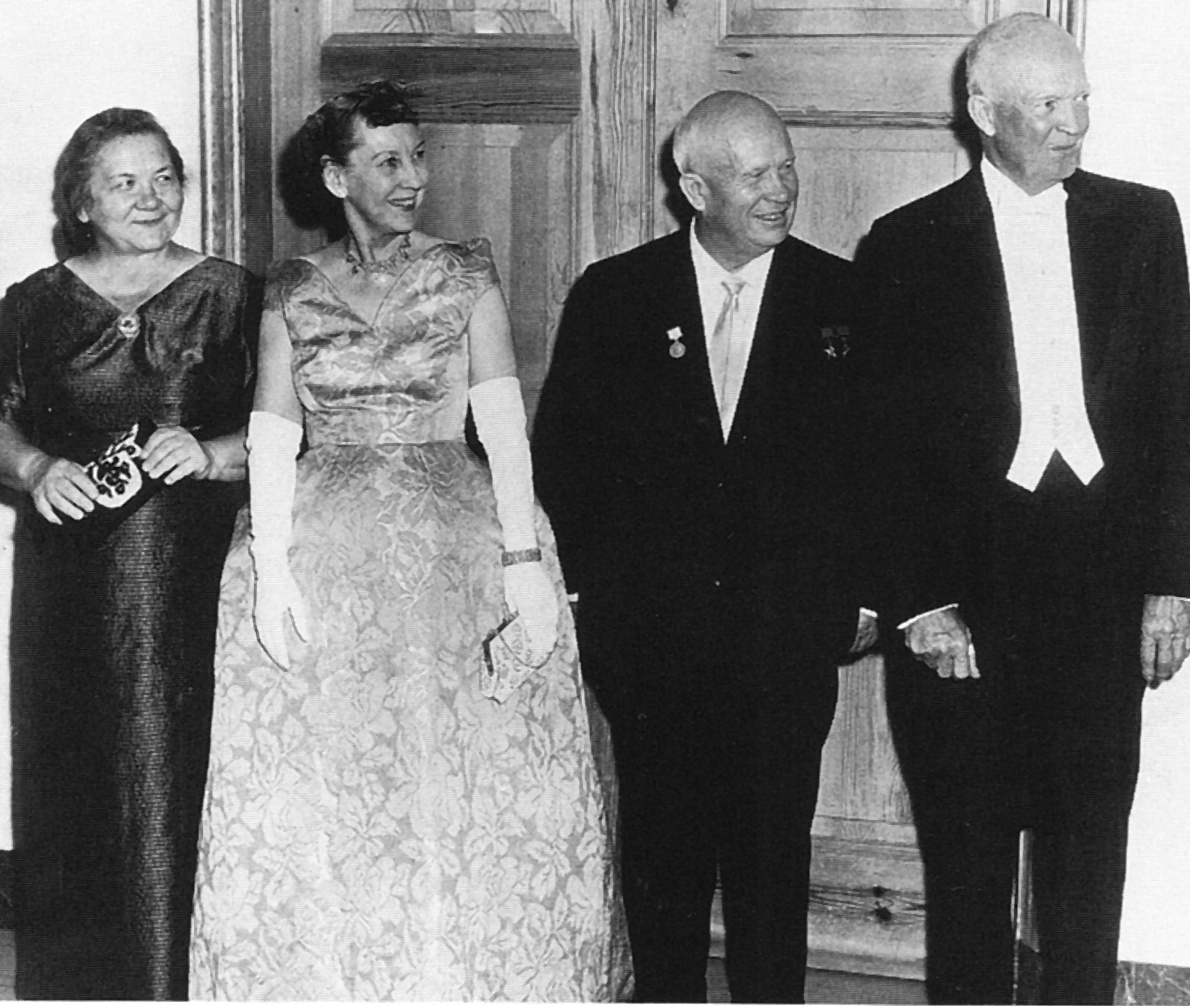
Nina Khrushcheva, Mamie Eisenhower, Nikita Khrushchev and Dwight Eisenhower at a state dinner at the White House on 27 September 1959.

Nikita Khrushchev paid a state visit to the United States from 15 to 27 September 1959. It marked the first state visit of a Soviet leader to the United States. Khrushchev, then first secretary of the Communist Party of the Soviet Union and chairman of the Council of Ministers, was also the first leader of the Soviet Union to set foot in the Western Hemisphere. Being the first visit by a leader of his kind, the coverage of it resulted in an extended media circus.

== Background ==
Earlier in 1959, Vice President Richard Nixon visited the Soviet Union, attending a tour of the American National Exhibition in Moscow. He and Khrushchev took part in what later became known as the Kitchen Debate, in which both Nixon and Khrushchev defended their country's respective economic systems. In early August of that year, it was announced by President Dwight Eisenhower that Khrushchev was invited to visit the United States, and did so that September, spending thirteen days in the country.

=== Opposition ===
Leading up to the event, the John Birch Society (JBS) formed the front organization CASE (the Committee Against Summit Entanglements) in opposition. The group, believing Eisenhower to be capitulating to the Soviet Union, raised over $87,000 and sent hundreds of thousands of postcards, bought advertisements in The New York Times and over a hundred other newspapers, as well as circulated a petition calling upon Eisenhower to not attend.

== Itinerary ==
During the course of the visit, Khrushchev traveled to Washington, D.C., New York, California (briefly visiting a supermarket in San Francisco), Iowa, Pennsylvania, and Camp David.

=== Arrival in Washington D.C. and Maryland ===
Khrushchev arrived in Washington, DC on 15 September 1959, landing at Andrews Air Force Base at 11:30 a.m. Khrushchev was accompanied by his wife Nina, as well as his adult children (son Sergei, daughters Yulia and Rada, and son-in-law Alexey). This was unprecedented, as it was not usual for Soviet officials to travel domestically or internationally with their families. Upon arrival, he and President Eisenhower were honored with a 21-gun salute as well as a national salute by a Joint Service (Army, Marine Corps, Navy, Air Force, and Coast Guard) Honor Guard, during which the State Anthem of the Soviet Union and "The Star-Spangled Banner" were played. Khrushchev and his family stayed at Blair House for the rest of the day. He arrived in Beltsville, Maryland the next morning. While attending the Agricultural Experiment Station, Khrushchev allegedly complained that the "pigs are too fat and the turkeys are too small". He returned to the capital later in the day for a luncheon at the National Press Club.

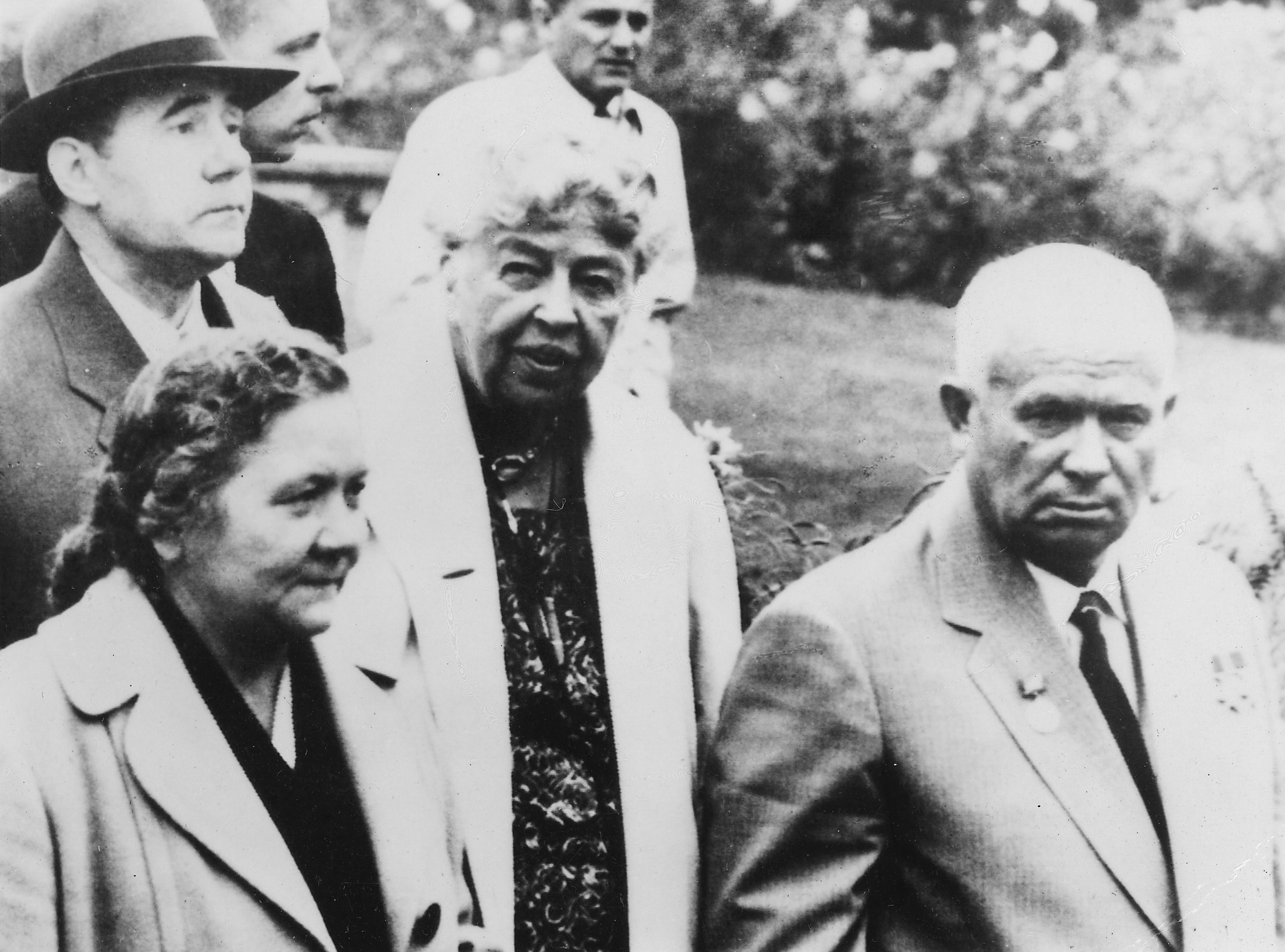
Andrei Gromyko, Nina Khrushcheva, Eleanor Roosevelt and Khrushchev in Hyde Park, New York. (Sept 18, 1959)

=== New York City ===
He arrived by train in New York City on 17 September. He spent his first night at a dinner hosted by the Economic Club of New York at the Waldorf Astoria, where he spoke to an audience of about 2,000 described by New York Herald Tribune as "one of history’s greatest concentrations of capitalists." During his visit to New York City, he visited former First Lady Eleanor Roosevelt at her home in Hyde Park. Khrushchev was accompanied by Henry Cabot Lodge Jr., the then-United States Ambassador to the United Nations, during his tour of the city. When touring Manhattan, Khrushchev reportedly argued with "capitalists" and yelled at hecklers who protested his visit. At the end of his tour, on 18 September he addressed the United Nations General Assembly with proposals of world disarmament. He also met with Governor Nelson Rockefeller and Mayor Robert F. Wagner Jr.

=== California ===
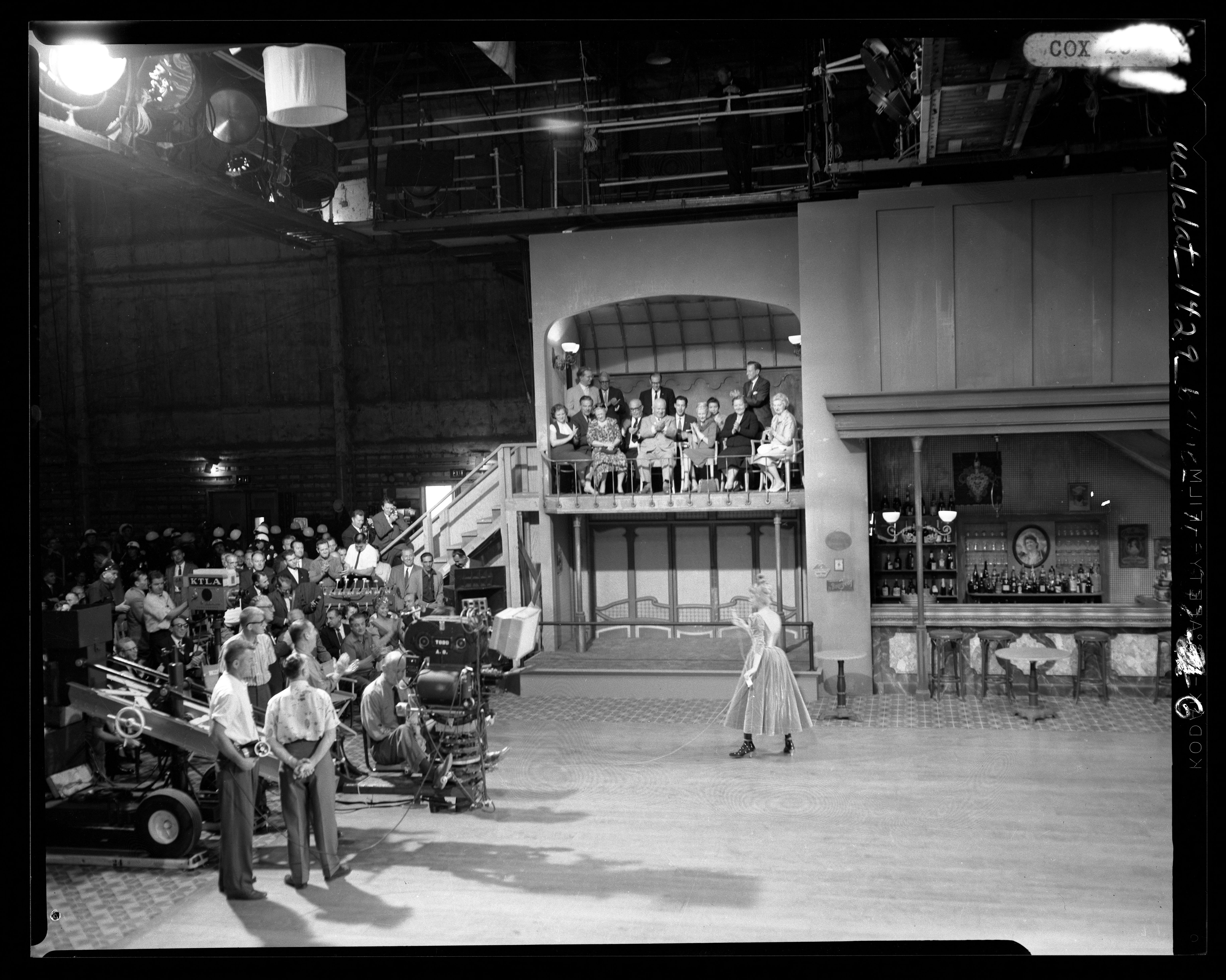
Nikita Khrushchev watches filming for the 1960 movie Can-Can at 20th Century Studios while visiting Los Angeles.

During the visit, Los Angeles mayor Norris Poulson addressed Khrushchev's "We will bury you" statement made at the Embassy of Poland in Moscow three years prior when delivering welcome remarks. Poulson stated the following: "We do not agree with your widely quoted phrase 'We shall bury you.' You shall not bury us and we shall not bury you. We are happy with our way of life. We recognize its shortcomings and are always trying to improve it. But if challenged, we shall fight to the death to preserve it". Poulson's comments came after the Soviet premier constantly touted Soviet superiority to L.A. during his tour of the city.

During a luncheon at the Twentieth Century-Fox Studio, Khrushchev was engaged in an improvised debate with his host Spyros Skouras over the respective merits of capitalism and communism. On the set of the film Can-Can, notable American actors such as Gary Cooper, Frank Sinatra, Elizabeth Taylor, and Marilyn Monroe met Khrushchev. Although Khrushchev was supposed to visit Disneyland on 19 September, the visit was canceled for security reasons, which added to his anger.

While visiting a new research campus for the International Business Machines Corporation (IBM) in San Jose, Khrushchev seemed to express little interest in the computer technology, but rather the self-service cafeteria, which he introduced in the USSR upon returning to Moscow.

=== Iowa ===
The Soviet leader arrived in Iowa on 22 September. He immediately attended a reception in Des Moines, hosted by Governor Herschel Loveless and Mayor Charles Iles the next day. He visited Coon Rapids, Iowa on 23 September, visiting the Roswell and Elizabeth Garst Farmstead Historic District. He was quick to compare the farm to many Soviet collective farms, saying the two types of farms were "very striking indeed". He also visited the Swine Research Center of Iowa State University. Khrushchev later remarked to journalists that the visit to Iowa was "the most relaxed" of his visit to the U.S.

=== Pennsylvania and Washington ===
Pittsburgh mayor Thomas Gallagher greeted and welcomed Khrushchev on 24 September, presenting the premier with a key to the city. The last two days concluded the tour with a meeting with President Eisenhower at Camp David. Khrushchev and his delegation left the country in the early hours of 27 September.

== Legacy ==
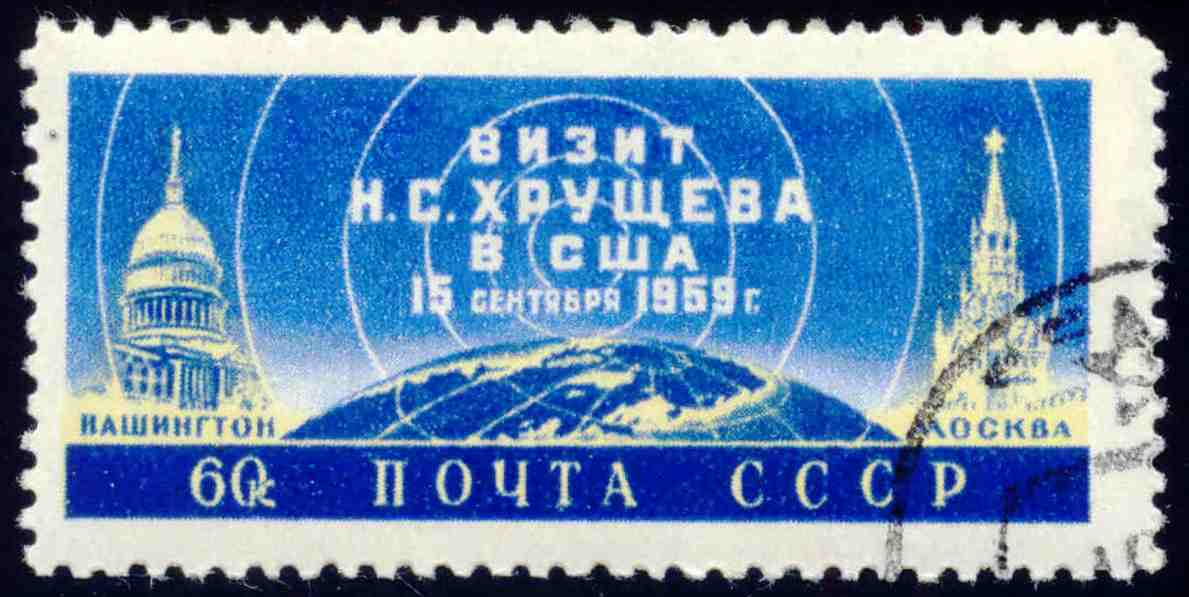
1959 Soviet stamp commemorating Khrushchev's visit

The visit took place during a period in time in which it was feared that the ongoing Cold War might eventually lead to nuclear war. The visit helped alleviate these fears. Khrushchev and Eisenhower reached an informal agreement that there would not be any firm deadline over the fate of Berlin and that any solution would be developed at a four-power summit. This summit would be postponed until 1960 due to actions by French President Charles de Gaulle. The premier left having achieved a personal relationship with Eisenhower and the possibility of détente with the Americans. Sergei Khrushchev, who became an American citizen in 1999, said that his father's visit brought about the "Spirit of Geneva". Sergei also stated that the visit also suppressed the idea that President Eisenhower was an "evil instigator of war".

Khrushchev gave Eisenhower a replica of the Soviet pennants that Luna 2 had placed onto the lunar surface a few days before Khrushchev arrived in the U.S. The sphere is kept at the Eisenhower Presidential Library and Museum in Abilene, Kansas. A copy of the spherical pennant is located at the Kansas Cosmosphere in Hutchinson, Kansas.

== See also ==
- Cold War (1953–1962)
- List of Soviet Union–United States summits
- Washington Summit

== Sources ==
- Carlson, Peter (2009). K Blows Top: A Cold War Comic Interlude Starring Nikita Khrushchev, America's Most Unlikely Tourist. PublicAffairs. ISBN 978-1-58648-497-2.
- Khrushchev, Sergei (2000). Nikita Khrushchev and the Creation of a Superpower. The Pennsylvania State University Press. ISBN 978-0-271-01927-7.
- Taubman, William (2003). Khrushchev: The Man and His Era. W.W. Norton & Co. ISBN 978-0-393-32484-6.
- Tompson, William J. (1995). Khrushchev: A Political Life. St. Martin's Press. ISBN 978-0-312-12365-9.
- "1959 Year in Review; Nixon visits Russia". United Press International. 1959.
- Whitman, Alden (12 September 1971). "Khrushchev's human dimensions brought him to power and to his downfall". The New York Times. (fee for article), free version
