= Resistance Is Futile! =

2018 book by Ann Coulter

Resistance Is Futile!: How the Trump-Hating Left Lost Its Collective Mind
- Author: Ann Coulter
- Language: English
- Subject: Donald Trump
- Publisher: Penguin Books
- Publication date: August 21, 2018
- Publication place: United States
- Media type: Print
- ISBN: 978-0-525-54007-6

Resistance Is Futile! How the Trump-Hating Left Lost Its Collective Mind is a 2018 book by Ann Coulter, in which the author argues that the American left has become irrational in its opposition to President Donald Trump.

== Summary ==
Coulter argues that the American left lies to rationalize their animus towards President Trump. She suggests the Democratic Party should pay attention to the needs of working-class Americans, and she contends that the American media are overwhelmingly opposed to President Trump.

== Publication ==
The book was published in August 2018 by Penguin Random House. It became a best seller.
