= Guilty: Liberal "Victims" and Their Assault on America =

2009 book by Ann Coulter

- Author: Ann Coulter
- Language: English
- Subject: Politics of the United States
- Publisher: Crown Forum
- Publication date: January 6, 2009
- Publication place: United States
- Media type: Print
- ISBN: 0-307-35346-X

Guilty: Liberal "Victims" and Their Assault on America is a book by American far-right author Ann Coulter, published in 2009. In the book, she argues that liberals are always playing the victim—when in fact, as she sees it, they are the victimizers. The book reached #2 on the New York Times best-sellers list and was her seventh book to appear on the list.
