= Mugged: Racial Demagoguery from the Seventies to Obama =

2012 book by Ann Coulter

- First edition (publ. Sentinel)
- Author: Ann Coulter
- Language: English
- Publisher: Sentinel
- Publication date: 2012
- ISBN: 978-1-59523-099-7 (first edition)
- Dewey Decimal: 305.800973
- LC Class: E184.A1 C658

Mugged: Racial Demagoguery from the Seventies to Obama is a 2012 book by Ann Coulter, in which the author discusses race and liberalism.

== Content ==
The book discusses the liberal left in the United States and how it has treated African Americans from the 1970s to the presidency of Barack Obama. Coulter states in the book that, in order to obtain the votes of African Americans, the Democratic Party has continually played the "race card" and accused the Republican Party of racism when it is not deserved. In relation to Barack Obama, Coulter said that he was only elected because of the idea that "you're a racist if you don't vote for the first black president" and that "someone with his youth and lack of experience would not be elected if he was white."

Coulter dedicates a section of the book to discussing the O. J. Simpson murder case and how, after his acquittal when African Americans were cheering for his release, it led to the shutdown of the "white guilt bank" related to white people feeling "guilty for racial unfairness". She continued saying that "everyone — blacks especially — are better off" because of this and that, afterward, "people weren’t walking on eggshells, you could have then-New York City Mayor Rudy Giuliani enforcing sane criminal laws in New York and not caring that we was constantly being called a racist by liberals and Al Sharpton".

Several other issues are briefly discussed in the book. This includes the beating of Rodney King, described by Coulter as "the most destructive edit in history" because "[W]hat the public saw was the officers’ final efforts to subdue a deranged suspect after all other methods had proved futile". Coulter also calls the Willie Horton 1988 ad "the greatest, fairest, most legitimate ad ever used in politics", along with saying that the Confederate flag used during the US Civil War shows "a pride in values that exist independently of the institution of slavery".

== Media campaign ==
To promote the book, Coulter appeared on various television and radio shows. ABC News did an on-air interview with Coulter on September 23, 2012, where interviewer George Stephanopoulos pointed out how she had stated in her book that "feminists, LGBT activists and immigrants rights groups had 'commandeered the blacks’ civil rights experience.'" Coulter responded by saying that "We don’t owe the homeless, we don’t owe the feminists, we don’t owe women who are desirous of having abortions or gays who want to get married to one another. That’s what ‘civil rights’ have become for much of the left", further adding when questioned about whether immigrant rights fit under civil rights, "No, I think civil rights are for blacks...We owe black people something, we have a legacy of slavery."

On the September 27, 2012 episode of The View, Coulter discussed the book, explaining the thesis as being "race-mongering has been very bad for America" and "white 'liberals use it to promote causes that have nothing to do with blacks and, in fact, harm blacks.'" However, one of The View's co-hosts, Whoopi Goldberg, questioned the subject of the book and Coulter's knowledge of the subject, stating "If you’re going to talk about race, at least know what you’re talking about" and noted that "your facts are a little shaky". Coulter responded by saying that "This isn’t a book about black people. It’s a book about white liberals."

Appearing on Glenn Beck's September 28, 2012 radio show, The Glenn Beck Program, to discuss the book, Coulter commented about her interview on The View, saying that Goldberg had attacked her because she was "daring to write a book about black people" and added, "As I told Whoopie it’s not how black people feel, and hurting America, and black America most of all".

== Critical reception ==
Jamelle Bouie of The American Prospect stated that the thesis Coulter's book revolves around was "insulting", adding that "Black people don't support Democrats because white liberals 'play the race card,' they support Democrats because their interests—material and symbolic—are best served by the Democratic Party". In comparison, Jeffrey Lord of The American Spectator praised Coulter's breakdown of past liberal actions, saying that Mugged was a "public service advertisement for a colorblind society. Martin Luther King Jr. would have loved Ann Coulter."

On his September 25, 2012 show, Rush Limbaugh discussed the book, saying it was a "typically hard-hitting and, at the same time, uniquely humorous book." Ray Hartwell for The Washington Times described the book as a "refreshing and informative antidote to the divisive narratives about race perpetuated by politicians and the mainstream media."
