= Can-Can (film) =

1960 film by Walter Lang

- Theatrical release poster
- Directed by: Walter Lang
- Written by: Dorothy Kingsley; Charles Lederer
- Based on: Can-Can by Abe Burrows
- Produced by: Jack Cummings; Saul Chaplin
- Starring: Frank Sinatra; Shirley MacLaine; Maurice Chevalier; Louis Jourdan
- Cinematography: William H. Daniels
- Edited by: Robert L. Simpson
- Music by: Cole Porter
- Production company: Suffolk-Cummings Productions
- Distributed by: 20th Century-Fox
- Release date: March 9, 1960
- Running time: 131 minutes
- Country: United States
- Language: English
- Budget: $5 million
- Box office: $4.2 million (US/ Canada rentals)

Can-Can is a 1960 American musical film made by Suffolk-Cummings productions and distributed by 20th Century-Fox. It was directed by Walter Lang, produced by Jack Cummings and Saul Chaplin. The screenplay was written by Dorothy Kingsley and Charles Lederer, loosely based on the musical play by Abe Burrows. The music and lyrics were written by Cole Porter for the play, but for the film, some songs were replaced by those from earlier Porter musicals. Art direction was handled by Jack Martin Smith and Lyle R. Wheeler, costume design by Irene Sharaff and dance staging by Hermes Pan. The film was photographed in Todd-AO. Although performing well on initial release, it failed to recoup its production costs from its domestic receipts.

The film stars Frank Sinatra, Shirley MacLaine, Maurice Chevalier and Louis Jourdan, and gave Juliet Prowse her first speaking role in a feature. Sinatra, who was paid $200,000 along with a percentage of the film's profits, acted in the film under a contractual obligation required by 20th Century-Fox after he had walked off the set of Carousel in 1955.

== Plot ==
In the Montmartre district of Paris, a dance known as the can-can, considered lewd, is performed nightly at the Bal du Paradis, a cabaret where Simone Pistache is both a dancer and the proprietor. On a night when her lawyer and lover, François Durnais, brings his good friend, chief magistrate Paul Barrière, to the café, a raid is staged by police. Claudine and the other dancers are placed under arrest and brought before the court.

Paul wishes the charges to be dismissed, but his younger colleague, Philippe Forrestier, believes the laws against public indecency should be enforced. Visiting the café and assuming another identity to gain evidence, Philippe becomes acquainted with Simone and almost succeeds in tricking her into a bet to provide a list of policemen who she has bought off. As Simone is in the process of opening her safe to take out the list, she is warned by Claudine that Philippe is the judge who presided over her recent case. Though unable to obtain the evidence he was hoping to get, charmed by Simone, Philippe develops a romantic interest in her.

Despite his attraction to Simone, Philippe again orders a raid on the café, and Simone is arrested. François attempts to blackmail Philippe with a compromising photograph, taken out of context on Philippe's visit to Simone's boudoir, to force him to drop the charges. However, Philippe had already decided to drop the case. Philippe then shocks Simone by proposing marriage to her. When François comes to visit her, she warns him that she will accept the proposal if he does not marry her himself, but he refuses the notion of ever marrying. Meanwhile, Paul tries to dissuade Philippe from the marriage, believing such an arrangement would end his career, but Philippe ignores his advice. Conspiring to sabotage the engagement, Paul arranges a party for the couple aboard a riverboat, during which François gets Simone drunk and encourages her to perform a bawdy routine in front of the upper-class guests. Humiliated at the guests’ reaction to her performance, Simone jumps off the boat and refuses to see Philippe again, writing to him that she cannot in good conscience become his bride.

Simone obtains a loan from François to stage a ball, insisting he accept the deed to the café as collateral. On the night of the ball, Simone presents an elaborate Garden of Eden Ballet, reminding the audience that sin was not born in Montmartre, though it may have been perfected there. Simone gets her revenge by then presenting a can-can, arranging for the police to raid the café and arrest François, now the legal proprietor. At the ensuing trial, Simone is called to testify but does not have the heart to give evidence against François. As the case is to be dismissed for lack of evidence, the president of a local moral league demands that action must be taken against the lewd performance. Paul suggests that the court view the dance firsthand to determine whether it is indecent. Simone, Claudine, and the dancers perform a can-can to the approval of all, who agree that it is not obscene. When the police nonetheless escort Simone to a police wagon, she is startled to find François inside, his having staged the false arrest. He points out that Simone called out for him when she found herself in danger. Angered by the ruse, Simone is shocked when he finally proposes; she nevertheless accepts.

== Cast ==
- Frank Sinatra as François Durnais, a shyster lawyer
- Shirley MacLaine as Simone Pistache, nightclub proprietress
- Maurice Chevalier as Paul Barriere, Senior Judge
- Louis Jourdan as Philippe Forrestiere, Junior Judge
- Juliet Prowse as Claudine, can-can dancer

== Songs ==
The film contains what critics now consider some of Cole Porter's most enduring songs, including "I Love Paris," "It's All Right With Me" and "C'est Magnifique." However, when the musical play premiered in 1953, many critics complained that Porter was producing material far below his usual standard. Some of the songs from the original Broadway musical were replaced by other more famous Porter songs for the film, including "Let's Do It," "Just One of Those Things" and "You Do Something to Me." "I Love Paris" is sung by the chorus over the opening credits rather than in the actual story by MacLaine. A version of "I Love Paris" by Sinatra and Chevalier was featured on the film's soundtrack album, but it was cut in previews when the studio realized that it slowed the film down. A photo of the sequence can be found in a New York Times Magazine article from February 21, 1960. The song takes place shortly after Act Two opens, in the scene in which Chevalier visits Sinatra in a nightclub.

• "I Love Paris" – Sung by chorus over the beginning credits and end screen

• "Montmart'" – Sung by Frank Sinatra, Maurice Chevalier and chorus

• "Maidens Typical of France" – Performed by Juliet Prowse and can-can girls

• "Can-Can" – Danced by Juliet Prowse and can-can girls; Reprised in the finale by Shirley MacLaine, Prowse, can-can girls and male dancers

• "C'est Magnifique" – Performed by Frank Sinatra; Reprised by Shirley MacLaine

• "Apache Dance" – Danced by Shirley MacLaine and male dancers

• "Live and Let Live" – Sung by Maurice Chevalier and Louis Jourdan

• "You Do Something to Me" – Sung by Louis Jourdan

• "Let's Do It, Let's Fall in Love" – Performed by Frank Sinatra and Shirley MacLaine

• "It's All Right with Me" – Sung by Frank Sinatra; Reprised by Louis Jourdan

• "Come Along with Me" – Performed by Shirley MacLaine

• "Just One of Those Things" – Sung by Maurice Chevalier

• "Garden of Eden Ballet" (interpolating portions of "I Love Paris") – Danced by Shirley MacLaine, Juliet Prowse, Marc Wilder and dancers

== Plot alterations ==
The plot of the musical was revised for the film adaptation. In the stage version, the judge is the leading character, but in the film, it is the lover of the nightclub owner who is the lead, and the judge forms the other half of a love triangle not found in the play. The character of Paul Barriere, a non-singing supporting part on stage, was enhanced and given two songs for Maurice Chevalier .

== Soviet propaganda controversy ==
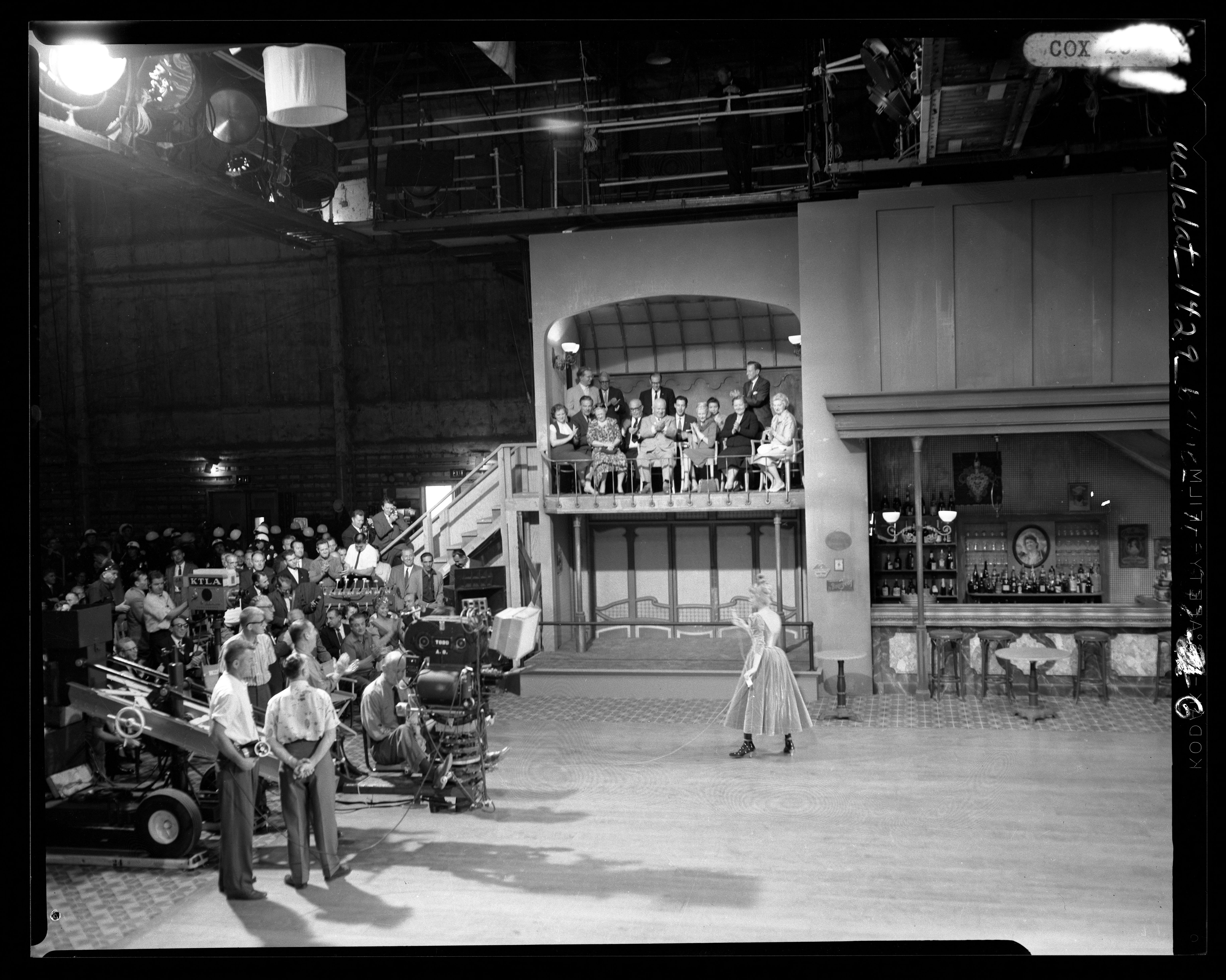
Khrushchev watching Can-Can being filmed at 20th Century Studios while visiting Los Angeles, September 20, 1959

During the filming, Premier of the Soviet Union Nikita Khrushchev famously visited the 20th Century Fox studios and was allegedly shocked by what he saw. He took the opportunity to make propagandistic use of his visit and described the dance, and by extension American culture, as "depraved" and "pornographic."

== Reception ==
In a contemporary review for The New York Times, critic Bosley Crowther lamented the film's deviations from the musical play: "The music has been reduced to snatches, the book has been weirdly changed and the dances–well, they have been abandoned for some tired jigs ..." Crowther also panned the script and performances: "The story is also a downright foolish pastiche, cut to Frank Sinatra and Miss MacLaine, who look about as logical in Paris of the Eighteen Nineties as they would look on the Russian hockey team. He, as a nonchalant young lawyer, and she, as the owner of a cabaret that is frequently being raided because they do the can-can there, behave, under Walter Lang's direction, as if they were companions in a Hoboken bar, slightly intoxicated and garrulous with gags. The experience of watching and listening to two such people would probably be about as amusing as watching and listening to Mr. Sinatra and Miss MacLaine." Kate Cameron, however, gave the film a full four-star rating in the New York Daily News, calling it "a rough-and-tumble, rowdy but entertaining film. The exhibition of the dance that has made Paris night clubs the mecca of world tourists since it was first introduced there in the early part of the 19th Century, is a rude, noisy, fast dance number, expertly performed by the chorus." She added:

The characters in the film production are admirably handled by Shirley MacLaine, Frank Sinatra, the incomparable Maurice Chevalier, Louis Jourdan, Marcel Dalio and a new dancer named Juliet Prowse.

SINATRA SINGS the Cole Porter songs in his inimitable style and plays the role of a rogue with ingratiating smoothness and although Shirley MacLaine hasn't the vocal force of Lilo, she manages the clever lyrics and enticing rhythms of the Porter score with deftness. Her dancing is her greatest talent and she performs an Apache number and the Garden of Eden ballet superbly. Juliet Prowse makes an auspicious debut as an actress-dancer, as she plays a role in the story and is a principal in the Garden of Eden ballet and a leader of the Can-Can chorus. She is expert in both forms of Terpsichorean art.

CHEVALIER AND Jourdan are excellent and have a duet together which is rendered with the charming comedy style that distinguished them in "Gigi." Jack Cummings has produced the film for 20th Century-Fox with a lavish hand, making it into lively screen entertainment. The sets, lighting and costuming are attractively done and Walter Lang has directed the players with skill. The action never lags, even when the story is interrupted by song and dance.

Dick Williams of the Los Angeles Mirror called it "a racy, raucous show with its ups and downs, emerging as a mixture of TV spec, Broadway revue and movie musical. It often seems more Beverly Hills Rat Pack Clan, thanks to members Frank Sinatra and Shirley MacLaine who are starred, than Paris, Montmartre, circa 1896." A user of the Mae Tinee pseudonym in the Chicago Daily Tribune opened her remark by saying that "Shirley MacLaine is a girl who can light up a screen, even a giant size one, and when she's in action, this musical is a lively affair. Frank Sinatra, as a glib and wary bachelor, is an excellent foil for her and also provides some good moments. But there are some dull stretches in the film when the thinness of the script shows thru, in spite of lavish sets and colorful costumes." Herb Lyon, in the same newspaper's Tower Ticker column, reacted differently to the film:

"Can Can" is a sheer filmusical delight. Tho hokey, it's never pokey. You don't even mind Frank Sinatra's and Shirley MacLaine's Brooklynese in a lush gay '90s Parisian setting. And, oo-la-la, that Cole Porter musical magic.

Mike Connolly, a syndicated columnist, wrote:

I'm surprised at Shirley MacLalne. She "mugs" all over the screen in "Can-Can." It's funny at first but it gets tiresome. As a result, Frank Sinatra "relaxes" the picture right out from under Shirley, who has plenty to learn about the art of underplaying parts.

Hortense Morton, in the San Francisco Examiner, "found the film real enjoyment despite the fact, it runs very long and one begins to wonder if one should have told the milkman to hold up morning delivery of the naif and half; left word with the gardener to water the lawn and told the neighbors to keep a lookout for prowlers." Myles Standish of the St. Louis Post-Dispatch wrote:

“CAN-CAN,” which is being offered with much ballyhoo at the AMBASSADOR THEATER, is something of a disappointment as an exposition of the gay life of a wicked Paris. It has three fairly good dance numbers, and some comic moments, But it is surprisingly deficient in over-all zest, is slow-paced, and lacks the charm and spirit of two musicals to which it might fairly be compared, “Gigi,” and “American in Paris.”

Richard L. Coe observed in The Washington Post that "KHRUSHCHEV was quite right. Though the dance he found so vulgar does not strike me so, 'Can-Can,' in full dosage at the Uptown, is just that. Consider: Metro having scored with turn-of-the-century Paris in “Gigi,” Twentieth Century-Fox takes two of its stars, Maurice Chevalier and Louis Jourdan, the same period and Cole Porter's stage musical. It then gives those stars little to do, adds Frank Sinatra and Shirley MacLaine, who are amusing but nonetheless pure Hoboken. Next it bolsters three of the master's irrelevant favorites, “Let’s Do It,” “You Do Something to Me” and “Just One of Those Things.” All this is then presented in Todd-AO, vast screen, stereophonic sound, all worthy of the Creation. At upped, reserved-seat prices. Heaven knows, Abe Burrows' stage book was fairly dim but what Dorothy Kingsley and Charles Lederer have been paid to add is even less inspired. Its most conspicuous quality is that inverse snobbism our West Coast gold-miners seem to find profitable with the masses: that judges and society folk are just snobs and that night club entertainers, crooked lawyers and others with no manners and bad speech are The Salt of the Earth." He added:

My major complaint is that the most has not been made of the material at hand, that it is ridiculous to have Chevalier around and not let him sing “I Love Paris” and that by having Miss MacLaine tear up a sketch by Toulouse-Lautrec does not necessarily suggest the period. I yield to no one in enjoyment of Sinatra singing Porter but I infinitely preferred the neglected elegance of Messrs. Jourdan and Chevalier and the sinuous underworked Juliet Prowse. Mr. Khrushchev only saw a smidget of “Can-Can” but had he seen it all he might have added a more devastating observation: it’s a bore. Small wonder he blew up in Paris.

W. Ward Marsh of the Cleveland Plain Dealer wrote that the film was "a combination of France and Hollywood, and this is good since there is an exacting balance between Frank Sinatra and Shirley MacLaine, who can do no wrong on the screen, and Maurice Chevalier and Louis Jourdan, who bring the necessary touch of Paris to a picture which sets out to entertain and winds up to pretty pure entertainment." Helen Bower wrote in the Detroit Free Press that "the madcap romance of Shirley MacLaine as the cafe proprietor with Frank Sinatra as her non-marrying lawyer gives these two stars great romp room for performances best suited to them." Francis Melrose of the Rocky Mountain News commented:

A musical seldom loses its impact by being transferred from stage to screen. In the case of “Can-Can,” it gains. There's a chance for greater opulence in setting, and more mobility in the action. In widescreen and color, all this splash and dash makes quite an eyeful. Cole Porter's famous tunes are warbled well by that old pro, Maurice Chevalier, by Louis Jourdan, Frank Sinatra and Shirley MacLaine. The picture’s dance productions provide some of its very best moments, It wouldn't hurt to have even one or two more of these fast, lively routines. The can-can production is the best I've ever seen. An Adam-and-Eve, snake-and-apple dance drama, is performed with high style, and the choreography is imaginative. Shirley MacLaine has a chance to demonstrate that she really can dance, in her role as Eve. Juliette Prowse dances as a wonderfully slinky, slithery serpent.

Harold Whitehead of the Montreal Gazette said that the "producer and director have taken what we have always felt was second rate Cole Porter and turned it into a first-rate motion picture production." Jacob Siskind of the Montreal Star called it "one of the more enjoyable musicals to have come out of Hollywood in some time. It’s partly the music and partly the cast that make it so." Clyde Gilmour of Maclean's magazine wrote:

Cole Porter’s Broadway hit of a few seasons ago has been processed into a big noisy musical which is pleasant entertainment although several of its top numbers are lacking in zip and sparkle. All-Amurrican voices and professional gay-Paree accents are somewhat incongruously mingled in the speech-patterns of the principals, all of whom are supposedly turn-of-the-century French.

Dick Richards of London's Daily Mirror called it "a feckless frolic version of a film. It is too long and leisurely but—thanks mainly to Shirley—it's as bubbly as a glass of champagne." Campbell Dixon of The Daily Telegraph of London wrote that "The production has faults. We could do with more Chevalier Mr Sinatra’s Americanism is so evident that the director gives Mr Jourdan a chance to mock it pleasantly. A running time of 141 minutes could have been cut with advantage. But there can be nothing but praise for the acting and direction. Shirley MacLaine's Simone is lush and sexy but not gross; Mr Sinatra manages to make the tricky lawyer llkeable; M Chevalier walks through his part with consummate ease; and Mr Jourdan with a combination of charm, distinction, and gentle courtesy that must be unique on the screen, gives a basically commonplace little fable a kind of grace."

The film was listed by Variety as the highest-grossing film of 1960 (behind 1959's Ben-Hur) with estimated rentals of $10 million, based on an estimated $3 million from 70-mm showings to December 1960 and $7 million estimated from future 35-mm showings. The expected future rentals were not achieved, and the rental was revised down to $4.2 million the following year.

== Awards and nominations ==
Academy Awards, 1961:

- Nominated – Best Costume Design
- Nominated – Best Scoring of a Musical Film

Golden Globe Awards, 1961:'

- Nominated – Best Motion Picture, Musical

Grammy Awards, 1961:

- Winner – Best Motion Picture Soundtrack
