= ¡Adios, America! =

Book by Ann Coulter

Adios, America: The Left's Plan to Turn Our Country Into a Third World Hellhole
- First edition
- Author: Ann Coulter
- Language: English
- Subject: Immigration; Right-wing politics
- Publisher: Regnery Publishing
- Publication date: 2015
- Publication place: United States
- Media type: Print
- Pages: 400
- ISBN: 9781621572671

¡Adios, America! The Left's Plan to Turn Our Country Into a Third World Hellhole is a 2015 book about immigration by American conservative pundit and author Ann Coulter. It was a New York Times Best Seller in the category Hardcover Nonfiction for three weeks.

== Summary ==
The book details the ways in which Coulter believes immigration from Latin American nations negatively impacts the United States.

Nathan Evans writes that "she uses her podium to attack not just liberals, her frequent targets, but those on the right who would offer up America wholesale under the guise of compassion and diversity, resulting in the exploitation of a more-than-willing workforce, as well as millions of new residents who will – most likely – bloc vote for Democrat candidates. That and cheap maids." Coulter claims that men who rape their underage family members are usually Hispanic.

The book is dedicated to journalist M. Stanton Evans, who died in 2015. It contains 17 chapters and 3 immigrant crime cases called ¨Spot the Immigrant.¨

== Critical reception ==
Reviewing it for National Review, Jay Nordlinger called it "a serious book making serious points" and said "Her contention is that the people, or People, have long wanted a clampdown on immigration, but the elites, or Elites, have thwarted them."

In The New York Times, Timothy Egan stated that "Her book has influenced Trump."

The Southern Poverty Law Center notes that she "routinely cites white nationalists, anti-Muslim activists and anti-immigrant groups" in the book.
