= Paul D. Escott =

American historian and author

Paul D. Escott is a professor emeritus, historian, and author. He is a professor at Wake Forest University and served as the college's dean for nine years. He has written some 13 books.

He graduated with a B.A. from Harvard College and with M.A. and P.h.D. degrees from Duke University.

== Writings ==
- After Secession: Jefferson Davis and the Failure of Confederate Nationalism (1978), ISBN 9780807103692
- Slavery Remembered: A Record of Twentieth-Century Slave Narratives (1979), ISBN 9780807864203
- Many Excellent People; Power and Privilege in North Carolina, 1850–1900 (1988), ISBN 9780807842287
- Major Problems in the History of the American South; Volume I; The Old South, co-editor (1991), ISBN 9780395871393
- The South for New Southerners, co-editor (1991), ISBN 9780807819326
- Military Necessity: Civil-Military Relations in the Confederacy (2006), ISBN 9780275983130
- "What Shall We Do with the Negro?": Lincoln, White Racism, and Civil War America. University of Virginia Press (2009), ISBN 9780813930466
- Lincoln’s Dilemma: Blair, Sumner, and the Republican Struggle over Racism and Equality in the Civil War Era (2014), ISBN 9780813939834
- Uncommonly Savage: Civil War and Remembrance in Spain and the United States, (2014) ISBN 0-8130-4893-1
- Paying Freedom's Price (2017), ISBN 9780810895416
- Rethinking the Civil War Era: Directions for Research University of Kentucky Press (2018)
- The Worst Passions of Human Nature: White Supremacy in the Civil War North (2020)
- Black Suffrage: Lincoln's Last Goal (2022), ISBN 9780813948171
- The Civil War Political Tradition: The Portraits of Those Who Formed It (2023), ISBN 9780813949697
