= Ann Coulter =

American conservative political activist (born 1961)

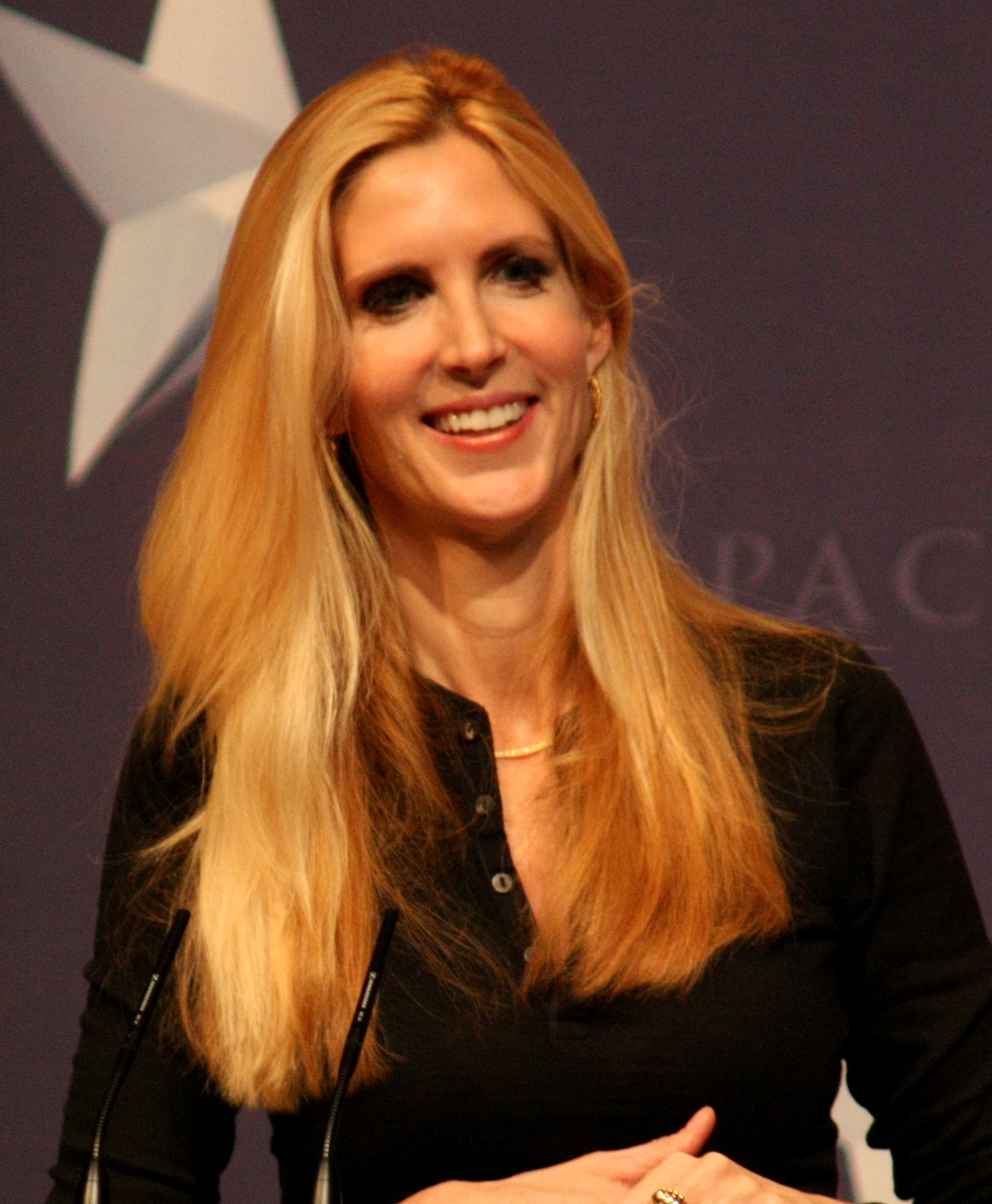
- Coulter in 2010
- Born: Ann Hart Coulter; December 8, 1961 (age 64); New York City, U.S.
- Education: Cornell University (BA); University of Michigan (JD)
- Occupations: Political activist; author; columnist; lawyer
- Political party: Republican
- Website: anncoulter.com

Ann Hart Coulter (Note: /ˈkoʊltər/) (born December 8, 1961) is an American conservative political activist, author, syndicated columnist, and lawyer. She became known as a media pundit in the late 1990s, appearing in print and on cable news as an outspoken critic of the Clinton administration. Her first book concerned the impeachment of Bill Clinton and drew from her experience writing legal briefs for Paula Jones's attorneys, as well as columns she wrote about the cases. Coulter's syndicated column for Universal Press Syndicate appears in newspapers and is featured on conservative websites. Coulter has also written 13 books.

== Early life and education ==
Ann Hart Coulter was born on December 8, 1961, in New York City, to John Vincent Coulter (1926–2008), an FBI agent from a working class family in Albany, New York, and Nell Husbands Coulter (née Martin; 1928–2009), a homemaker who was born in Paducah, Kentucky. Coulter has described her mother of being raised as a Protestant with ancestry on both sides of her family being Founding Stock, tracing back to a group of English Puritans who settled the Plymouth Colony of British America (now in Southeastern Massachusetts), arriving on the Griffin with Thomas Hooker in 1633. Her paternal family is Catholic of Irish and German descent, who had arrived in America four generations ago. Coulter has further claimed that all eight of her paternal great-great-grandparents were 19th-century immigrants from Europe, with six of them escaping the potato famine in Ireland, and the other two having come from Germany. She has described her Irish ancestors of working as ship laborers, tilemakers, brickmakers, carpenters and flagmen after arriving in America.

Coulter's father attended college on the GI Bill and later became an FBI agent. She has two older brothers: James, an accountant, and John, an attorney. Her family later moved to New Canaan, Connecticut, where Coulter and her two brothers were raised. Coulter graduated from New Canaan High School in 1980. She then Cornell University College of Arts and Sciences, where she helped find The Cornell Review, and was a member of the Delta Gamma national sorority. She graduated cum laude from Cornell in 1984 with a Bachelor of Arts degree in history and received her Juris Doctor from the University of Michigan Law School in 1988, where she was an editor of the Michigan Law Review. At Michigan, Coulter was president of the local chapter of the Federalist Society and was trained at the National Journalism Center.

Coulter's age was disputed in 2002. While she argued that she was not yet 40, The Washington Post columnist Lloyd Grove cited a birthdate of December 8, 1961, which Coulter provided when registering to vote in New Canaan, Connecticut, prior to the 1980 presidential election, for which she had to be 18 years old to register. A driver's license issued several years later purportedly listed her birthdate as December 8, 1963. Coulter has not confirmed either date, citing privacy concerns.

== Career ==
After law school, Coulter served as a law clerk in Kansas City for Judge Pasco Bowman II of the United States Court of Appeals for the Eighth Circuit. After a short time working in New York City in private practice, where she specialized in corporate law, Coulter left to work for the United States Senate Judiciary Committee after the Republican Party took control of Congress in 1994. She handled crime and immigration issues for Senator Spencer Abraham of Michigan and helped craft legislation designed to expedite the deportation of aliens convicted of felonies. She later became a litigator with the Center for Individual Rights.

Coulter has written 13 books, and also publishes a syndicated newspaper column. She is particularly known for her polemical style, and describes herself as someone who likes to "stir up the pot. I don't pretend to be impartial or balanced, as broadcasters do". She idolized Clare Boothe Luce for her satirical style. She also makes numerous public appearances, speaking on television and radio talk shows, as well as on college campuses, receiving both praise and protest. Coulter typically spends 6 to 12 weeks of the year on speaking engagement tours, and more when she has a book coming out.

In 2010, she made an estimated $500,000 on the speaking circuit, giving speeches on topics of modern conservatism, gay marriage, and what she describes as the hypocrisy of modern American liberalism. During one appearance at the University of Arizona, a pie was thrown at her. In defense of her ideas, Coulter has on occasion responded with inflammatory remarks toward hecklers and protestors who attend her speeches.

=== Books ===
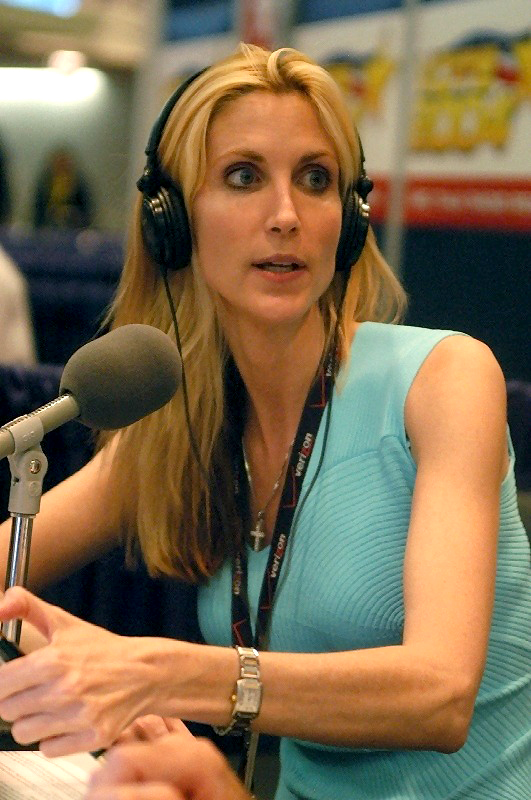
Ann Coulter at the 2004 Republican National Convention

Coulter has authored twelve books, including many that have appeared on The New York Times Best Seller list, with a combined 3 million copies sold as of May 2009.

In 1998, Coulter's first book, High Crimes and Misdemeanors: The Case Against Bill Clinton, was published by Regnery Publishing and made The New York Times Bestseller list. It details Coulter's case for the impeachment of President Bill Clinton.

In October 2001, Coulter was accused of plagiarism by Michael Chapman, a columnist for the journal Human Events who claims that passages were taken from a supplement he wrote for the journal in 1997 titled "A Case for Impeachment".

In 2002, her second book, Slander: Liberal Lies About the American Right, published by Crown Forum, reached the number one spot on The New York Times non-fiction best seller list. In Slander, Coulter argues that President George W. Bush was given unfair negative media coverage. The factual accuracy of Slander was called into question by then-comedian and author, later Democratic U.S. senator from Minnesota, Al Franken; he also accused her of citing passages out of context. Others investigated these charges, and also raised questions about the book's accuracy and presentation of facts. Coulter responded to criticisms in a column called "Answering My Critics".

In 2003, her third book, Treason: Liberal Treachery from the Cold War to the War on Terrorism, published by Crown Forum, reexamines the 60-year history of the Cold War—including the career of Senator Joseph McCarthy, the Whittaker Chambers-Alger Hiss affair, and Ronald Reagan's challenge to Mikhail Gorbachev to "tear down this wall"—and argues that liberals were wrong in their Cold War political analyses and policy decisions, and that McCarthy was correct about Soviet agents working for the U.S. government. She also argues that the correct identification of Annie Lee Moss, among others, as communists was misreported by the liberal media. Treason spent 13 weeks on the Best Seller list.

In 2004, Crown Forum published a collection of Coulter's columns as her fourth book, How to Talk to a Liberal (If You Must): The World According to Ann Coulter.

In 2006, Coulter's fifth book, published by Crown Forum, is Godless: The Church of Liberalism. In it, she argues, first, that American liberalism rejects the idea of God and reviles people of faith, and second, that it bears all the attributes of a religion itself. Godless debuted at number one on the New York Times Best Seller list. On the July 5, 2006, episode of Countdown with Keith Olbermann on MSNBC, guest John Barrie, the CEO of iParadigms, claimed that Coulter plagiarized in her book as well as in her columns over the previous year. Barrie ran "Godless" through iThenticate, his company's machine, which is able to scan works and compare them to existing texts. He found a 25-word section of the text that was "virtually word-for-word" matched with a Planned Parenthood pamphlet and a 33-word section almost duplicating a 1999 article from the Portland Press as some examples of evidence. Barrie also said that it was "very, very difficult to try to determine whether Ann Coulter was citing that material or whether she was just trying to pass it off".

The syndicator of her columns cleared her of the plagiarism charges. Universal Press Syndicate and Crown Books also defended Coulter against the charges. Columnist Bill Nemitz from the Portland Press Herald accused Coulter of plagiarizing a very specific sentence from his newspaper in her book Godless, but he also acknowledged that one sentence is insufficient grounds for filing suit.

Coulter's If Democrats Had Any Brains, They'd Be Republicans (Crown Forum), published in October 2007, and Guilty: Liberal "Victims" and Their Assault on America (Crown Forum), published on January 6, 2009, both also achieved best-seller status.

In June 2011, Crown Forum published her eighth book Demonic: How the Liberal Mob Is Endangering America.

Her ninth book, published September 2012, was Mugged: Racial Demagoguery from the Seventies to Obama. It argues that liberals, and Democrats in particular, have taken undue credit for racial civil rights in America.

Coulter's tenth book, Never Trust a Liberal Over 3 – Especially a Republican, was released in October 2013. It is her second collection of columns and her first published by Regnery since her first book, High Crimes and Misdemeanors. In June 2015, Coulter published her eleventh book, Adios, America: The Left's Plan to Turn Our Country Into a Third World Hellhole. The book addresses illegal immigration, amnesty programs, and border security in the United States.

=== Columns ===
In the late 1990s, Coulter's weekly (biweekly from 1999 to 2000) syndicated column for Universal Press Syndicate began appearing. Her column is featured on six conservative websites: Human Events Online, WorldNetDaily, Townhall.com, VDARE, FrontPage Magazine, Jewish World Review and her own website. Her syndicator says, "Ann's client newspapers stick with her because she has a loyal fan base of conservative readers who look forward to reading her columns in their local newspapers".

In 1999, Coulter worked as a columnist for George magazine. Coulter also wrote weekly columns for the conservative magazine Human Events between 1998 and 2003, with occasional columns thereafter. In her columns, she discussed judicial rulings, constitutional issues, and legal matters affecting Congress and the executive branch.

In 2001, as a contributing editor and syndicated columnist for National Review Online (NRO), Coulter was asked by editors to make changes to a piece written after the September 11 attacks. On the show Politically Incorrect, Coulter accused NRO of censorship and said she was paid $5 per article. NRO dropped her column and terminated her editorship. Jonah Goldberg, the editor-at-large of NRO, said: "We did not 'fire' Ann for what she wrote... we ended the relationship because she behaved with a total lack of professionalism, friendship, and loyalty [concerning the editing disagreement]."

In August 2005, the Arizona Daily Star dropped Coulter's syndicated column, citing reader complaints: "Many readers find her shrill, bombastic, and mean-spirited. And those are the words used by readers who identified themselves as conservatives".

In July 2006, some newspapers replaced Coulter's column with those of other conservative columnists following the publication of her fourth book, Godless: The Church of Liberalism. After The Augusta Chronicle dropped her column, newspaper editor Michael Ryan said: "it came to the point where she was the issue rather than what she was writing about." Ryan added that he continued himself "to be an Ann Coulter fan" as "her logic is devastating and her viewpoint is right most of the time."

=== Television, film, and radio ===
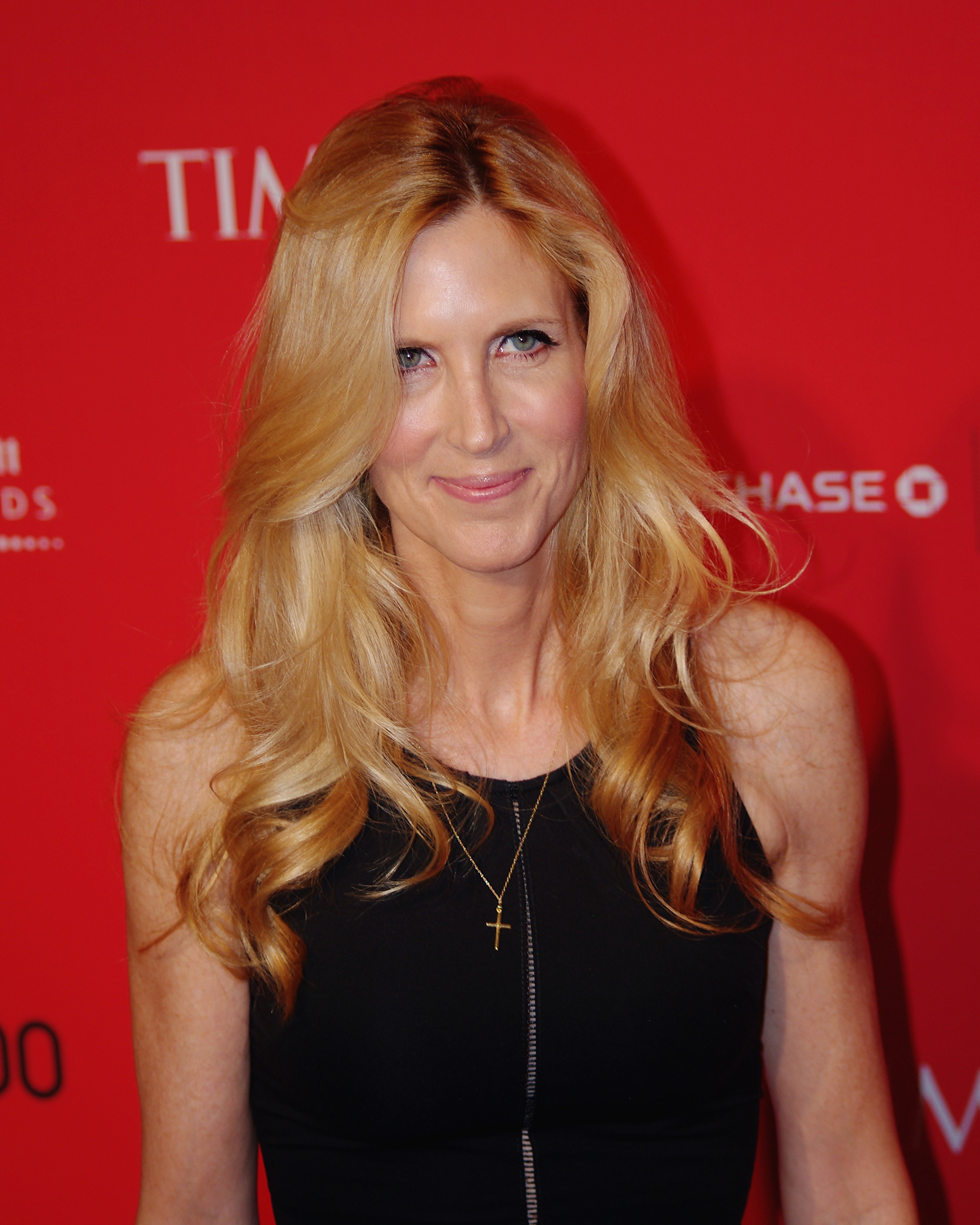
Ann Coulter at the 2012 Time 100

Coulter made her first national media appearance in 1996 after she was hired by the then-fledgling network MSNBC as a legal correspondent. She later appeared on CNN and Fox News, and went on to make frequent guest appearances on many television and radio talk shows. Additionally, she stars in the 2015 film Sharknado 3: Oh Hell No!, in which she portrays the vice-president of the United States.

== Political views ==
Ann Coulter is a conservative columnist. In 2003, described herself as a "typical, immodest-dressing, swarthy male-loving, friend-to-homosexuals, ultra-conservative." She is a registered Republican and former member of the advisory council of GOProud since August 9, 2011. When Milo Yiannopoulos initially defended pederasty, Coulter commented, "Well, Milo learned HIS lesson. Pederasty acceptable only for refugees and illegals. Then libs will support you." According to NBC News, Coulter has been known for her "racist and anti-immigrant stances" and has made several xenophobic comments about Nikki Haley in a racist tirade.

=== Abortion ===
Coulter supported the Dobbs v. Jackson Women's Health Organization ruling, which overturned the Roe v. Wade and Planned Parenthood v. Casey precedent. She describes herself as an "anti-abortion zealot". She believes abortion, excluding abortion exceptions in cases of fetal impairment, rape and danger to a woman's life or health, should be illegal in most other cases.

=== Christianity ===
Coulter is a Presbyterian. Coulter was raised by a Catholic father and Protestant mother. At one public lecture she said: "I don't care about anything else; Christ died for my sins, and nothing else matters."

Confronting some critics' views that her content and style of writing is unchristian, Coulter said that she is "a Christian first and a mean-spirited, bigoted conservative second, and don't you ever forget it." Six years later, in 2011, she also said "Christianity fuels everything I write."

=== Confederate flag and Indian-Americans ===
Coulter has defended the display of the Confederate flag accusing US-born Nikki Haley, who is Indian-American, of being an "immigrant" for removing the Confederate flag during her term as Governor. Coulter repeated her attack on Haley for removing the Confederate flag in 2023, saying that Haley should "go back to [her] own country." Coulter further called Haley a "bimbo" and a "preposterous creature." She also remarked "This is my country, lady, I'm not an American Indian, and I don't like them taking down all the monuments." Coulter attacked India for "worshipping cows" and having a "rat temple".

During the 2024 Republican presidential debates, following an exchange between Haley and Vivek Ramaswamy, Coulter tweeted "Nikki and Vivek are involved in some Hindu business, it seems. Not our fight." Haley is a Christian born into a Sikh family. During an appearance on Ramaswamy's podcast, Coulter told Ramaswamy "I agreed with many, many things you said during your campaign, in fact probably more than most other candidates when you were running for president. But I still would not have voted for you because you're an Indian." Coulter further said that "doesn't mean we can't take anyone else in—a Sri Lankan, a Japanese, or an Indian—but the core around which the nation's values are formed is the WASP."

Coulter defended Donald Trump's false claim that Kamala Harris, who is multiracial, only claimed to be African-American when she ran for President. Coulter said "So to make the point that Kamala isn't a foundational Black American, I'm always pointing out to Black people, have you noticed Indians are getting all the good diversity jobs?"

=== Evolution ===
Coulter advocates teaching intelligent design, a pseudoscientific anti-evolution ideology, alongside evolution. In Godless: The Church of Liberalism, Coulter characterized the theory of evolution as bogus science, and contrasted her beliefs to what she called the left's "obsession with Darwinism and the Darwinian view of the world, which replaces sanctification of life with sanctification of sex and death".

=== Civil liberties ===
Coulter endorsed the NSA's Terrorist Surveillance Program directed at Al-Qaeda. During a 2011 appearance on Stossel, she said "PATRIOT Act, fantastic, Gitmo, fantastic, waterboarding, not bad, though torture would've been better." She criticized Rand Paul for "this anti-drone stuff".

Coulter opposes hate crime laws, calling them "unconstitutional". She also stated that "Hate-crime provisions seem vaguely directed at capturing a sense of cold-bloodedness, but the law can do that without elevating some victims over others."

=== Civil rights ===
Although Coulter supported the Brown v. Board of Education ruling, she is critical of desegregation busing, which she calls "forced busing" and desegregation court rulings since Brown v. Board of Education. She supports literacy tests for voting, which she claims are not unconstitutional or prohibited in the Civil Rights Act of 1964. She supports the Civil Rights Act of 1964.

=== Women's rights ===
Coulter rejects "the academic convention of euphemism and circumlocution", and is claimed to play to misogyny in order to further her goals; she "dominates without threatening (at least not straight men)". Feminist critics also reject Coulter's opinion that the gains made by women have gone so far as to create an anti-male society and her call for women to be rejected from the military because they are more vicious than men. Like the late anti-feminist Phyllis Schlafly, Coulter uses traditionally masculine rhetoric as reasoning for the need for traditional gender roles, and she carries this idea of feminized dependency into her governmental policies, according to feminist critics.

Coulter said in 2021 that women should not be allowed to vote.

=== Immigration ===
Coulter has criticized former president George W. Bush's immigration proposals. In a 2007 column, she claimed that the current immigration system was set up to deliberately reduce the percentage of whites in the population.

Coulter opposes the Immigration and Nationality Act of 1965. She strongly opposed amnesty for undocumented immigrants, and at the 2013 CPAC said she had become "a single-issue voter against amnesty".

In June 2018, during the controversy caused by the Trump administration family separation policy, Coulter dismissed immigrant children as "child actors weeping and crying" and urged Trump not to "fall for it".

Coulter is an advocate of the white genocide conspiracy theory. She has compared non-white immigration into the United States with genocide, and claiming that "a genocide" is occurring against South African farmers, she has said that the Boers are the "only real refugees" in South Africa. Regarding domestic politics, Vox labelled Coulter as one of many providing a voice for "the 'white genocide' myth", and the SPLC covered Coulter's remarks that if the demographic changes occurring in the U.S. were being "legally imposed on any group other than white Americans, it would be called genocide".

=== LGBT rights ===
==== Lesbian, gay, and bisexual rights ====
Since the 1990s, Coulter has had many acquaintances in the LGBT community. She describes herself as "the Judy Garland of the Right", reflecting Garland's large fan base from the gay community. In the last few years before 2015 she attracted LGBT fans, namely gay men and drag queens.

Coulter opposes same-sex marriage, opposes Obergefell v. Hodges, and supports, after previously saying she did not, a federal U.S. constitutional amendment defining marriage as a union of one man and one woman. She claims her opposition to same-sex marriage "wasn't an anti-gay thing" and that "It's genuinely a pro-marriage position to oppose gay marriage". Coulter claims that same-sex marriage would "ruin gay culture", because "gays value promiscuous sex over monogamy".

Coulter also opposes civil unions and privatizing marriage. When addressed with the issue of rights granted by marriage, she said, "Gays already can visit loved ones in hospitals. They can also visit neighbors, random acquaintances, and total strangers in hospitals—just like everyone else. Gays can also pass on property to whomever they would like." She also stated that same-sex sexual intercourse was already protected under the Fourth Amendment, which prevents police from going into your home without a search warrant or court order.

Coulter disagreed with repealing Don't Ask Don't Tell, stating that it is not an "anti-gay position; it is a pro-military position" because "sexual bonds are disruptive to the military bond". She also stated that there is "no proof that all the discharges for homosexuality involve actual homosexuals."

Coulter has expressed her opposition to treatment of LGBT people in the countries of Cuba, China, and Saudi Arabia.

At the 2007 CPAC, Coulter said, "I do want to point out one thing that has been driving me crazy with the media—how they keep describing Mitt Romney's position as being pro-gays, and that's going to upset the right wingers", and "Well, you know, screw you! I'm not anti-gay. We're against gay marriage. I don't want gays to be discriminated against." She added, "I don't know why all gays aren't Republican. I think we have the pro-gay positions, which is anti-crime and for tax cuts. Gays make a lot of money and they're victims of crime. No, they are! They should be with us."

In Coulter's 2007 book If Democrats Had Any Brains, They'd Be Republicans, in the chapter "Gays: No Gay Left Behind!", she argued that Republican policies were more pro-gay than Democratic policies. Coulter attended the 2010 HomoCon of GOProud, where she gave a speech about why gays should oppose same-sex marriage.

At the 2011 CPAC, during her question-and-answer segment, Coulter was asked about GOProud and the controversy over their inclusion at the 2011 CPAC. She boasted how she talked GOProud into dropping its support for same-sex marriage in the party's platform, saying, "The left is trying to co-opt gays, and I don't think we should let them. I think they should be on our side", and "Gays are natural conservatives". Later that year, she joined advisory board for GOProud. On Logo's The A-List: Dallas she told gay Republican Taylor Garrett that "The gays have got to be pro-life", and "As soon as they find the gay gene, guess who the liberal yuppies are gonna start aborting?"

=== War on drugs ===
Coulter strongly supports continuing the war on drugs. However, she has said that, if there were not a welfare state, she "wouldn't care" if drugs were legal. She spoke about drugs as a guest on Piers Morgan Live, where she said that marijuana users "can't perform daily functions".

=== Bernie Sanders ===
In April 2019, Coulter said of Senator Bernie Sanders she would vote and perhaps even work for him in the 2020 U.S. presidential election if he stuck to his "original position" on U.S. border policy. "If he went back to his original position, which is the pro blue-collar position—I mean, it totally makes sense with him", and "If he went back to that position, I'd vote for him, I might work for him. I don't care about the rest of the socialist stuff. Just, can we do something for ordinary Americans?"

== Political activities and commentary ==
Ann Coulter has described herself as a "polemicist" who likes to "stir up the pot" and does not "pretend to be impartial or balanced, as broadcasters do". While her political activities in the past have included advising a plaintiff suing President Bill Clinton as well as considering a run for Congress, she mostly serves as a political pundit, sometimes creating controversy ranging from rowdy uprisings at some of the colleges where she speaks to protracted discussions in the media.

Time magazine's John Cloud once observed that Coulter "likes to shock reporters by wondering aloud whether America might be better off if women lost the right to vote". This was in reference to her statement that "it would be a much better country if women did not vote. That is simply a fact. In fact, in every presidential election since 1950—except Goldwater in '64—the Republican would have won, if only the men had voted." Similarly, in an October 2007 interview with The New York Observer, Coulter said:

If we took away women's right to vote, we'd never have to worry about another Democrat president. It's kind of a pipe dream, it's a personal fantasy of mine, but I don't think it's going to happen. And it is a good way of making the point that women are voting so stupidly, at least single women. It also makes the point, it is kind of embarrassing, the Democratic Party ought to be hanging its head in shame, that it has so much difficulty getting men to vote for it. I mean, you do see it's the party of women and 'We'll pay for health care and tuition and day care—and here, what else can we give you, soccer moms?'

Coulter has also appeared on Fox News and advocated for a poll tax and a literacy test for voters (this was in 1999, and she reiterated her support of a literacy test in 2015).

=== Paula Jones – Bill Clinton case ===
Coulter first became a public figure shortly before becoming an unpaid legal adviser for the attorneys representing Paula Jones in her sexual harassment suit against President Bill Clinton. Coulter's friend George Conway had been asked to assist Jones' attorneys, and shortly afterward Coulter, who wrote a column about the Paula Jones case for Human Events, was also asked to help, and she began writing legal briefs for the case.

Coulter later stated that she would come to mistrust the motives of Jones' head lawyer, Joseph Cammaratta, who by August or September 1997 was advising Jones that her case was weak and to settle, if a favorable settlement could be negotiated. From the outset, Jones had sought an apology from Clinton at least as eagerly as she sought a settlement. However, in a later interview Coulter recounted that she herself had believed that the case was strong, that Jones was telling the truth, that Clinton should be held publicly accountable for his misconduct, and that a settlement would give the impression that Jones was merely interested in extorting money from the President.

David Daley, who wrote the interview piece for The Hartford Courant recounted what followed:

Coulter played one particularly key role in keeping the Jones case alive. In Newsweek reporter Michael Isikoff's new book Uncovering Clinton: A Reporter's Story, Coulter is unmasked as the one who leaked word of Clinton's "distinguishing characteristic"—his reportedly bent penis that Jones said she could recognize and describe—to the news media. Her hope was to foster mistrust between the Clinton and Jones camps and forestall a settlement ... I thought if I leaked the distinguishing characteristic it would show bad faith in negotiations. [Clinton lawyer] Bob Bennett would think Jones had leaked it. Cammaratta would know he himself hadn't leaked it and would get mad at Bennett. It might stall negotiations enough for me to get through to [Jones adviser] Susan Carpenter-McMillan to tell her that I thought settling would hurt Paula, that this would ruin her reputation, and that there were other lawyers working for her. Then 36 hours later, she returned my phone call. I just wanted to help Paula. I really think Paula Jones is a hero. I don't think I could have taken the abuse she came under. She's this poor little country girl and she has the most powerful man she's ever met hitting on her sexually, then denying it and smearing her as president. And she never did anything tacky. It's not like she was going on TV or trying to make a buck out of it."

In his book, Isikoff also reported Coulter as saying: "We were terrified that Jones would settle. It was contrary to our purpose of bringing down the President." After the book came out, Coulter clarified her stated motives, saying:

The only motive for leaking the distinguishing characteristic item that [Isikoff] gives in his book is my self-parodying remark that "it would humiliate the president" and that a settlement would foil our efforts to bring down the president ... I suppose you could take the position, as [Isikoff] does, that we were working for Jones because we thought Clinton was a lecherous, lying scumbag, but this argument gets a bit circular. You could also say that Juanita Broaddrick's secret motive in accusing Clinton of rape is that she hates Clinton because he raped her. The whole reason we didn't much like Clinton was that we could see he was the sort of man who would haul a low-level government employee like Paula to his hotel room, drop his pants, and say, "Kiss it." You know: Everything his defense said about him at the impeachment trial. It's not like we secretly disliked Clinton because of his administration's position on California's citrus cartels or something, and then set to work on some crazy scheme to destroy him using a pathological intern as our Mata Hari.

The case went to court after Jones broke with Coulter and her original legal team, and it was dismissed via summary judgment. The judge ruled that even if her allegations proved true, Jones did not show that she had suffered any damages, stating, "... plaintiff has not demonstrated any tangible job detriment or adverse employment action for her refusal to submit to the governor's alleged advances. The president is therefore entitled to summary judgment on plaintiff's claim of quid pro quo sexual harassment." The ruling was appealed by Jones' lawyers. During the pendency of the appeal, Clinton settled with Jones for $850,000 ($151,000 after legal fees) in November 1998, in exchange for Jones' dismissal of the appeal. By then, the Jones lawsuit had given way to the Monica Lewinsky sex scandal.

In October 2000, Jones revealed that she would pose for nude pictures in an adult magazine, saying she wanted to use the money to pay taxes and support her grade-school-aged children, in particular saying, "I'm wanting to put them through college and maybe set up a college fund." Coulter publicly denounced Jones, calling her "the trailer-park trash they said she was" (Coulter had earlier chastened Clinton supporters for calling Jones this name), after Clinton's former campaign strategist James Carville had made the widely reported remark, "Drag a $100 bill through a trailer park, and you'll never know what you'll find", and called Jones a "fraud, at least to the extent of pretending to be an honorable and moral person".

Coulter wrote:

Paula surely was given more than a million dollars in free legal assistance from an array of legal talent she will never again encounter in her life, much less have busily working on her behalf. Some of those lawyers never asked for or received a dime for hundreds of thousands of dollars in legal work performed at great professional, financial and personal cost to themselves. Others got partial payments out of the settlement. But at least they got her reputation back. And now she's thrown it away.

Jones claimed not to have been offered any help with a book deal of her own or any other additional financial help after the lawsuit.

=== Comments on Islam, Arabs, and terrorism ===
Coulter's September 14, 2001, column eulogized her friend Barbara Olson, killed three days earlier in the September 11 attacks, and ended with a call for war:

Airports scrupulously apply the same laughably ineffective airport harassment to Suzy Chapstick as to Muslim hijackers. It is preposterous to assume every passenger is a potential crazed homicidal maniac. We know who the homicidal maniacs are. They are the ones cheering and dancing right now. We should invade their countries, kill their leaders and convert them to Christianity. We weren't punctilious about locating and punishing only Hitler and his top officers. We carpet-bombed German cities; we killed civilians. That's war. And this is war.

These comments resulted in Coulter being fired as a columnist by National Review, which she subsequently referred to as "squeamish girly-boys". Responding to this comment, Ibrahim Hooper of the Council on American–Islamic Relations remarked in the Chicago Sun-Times that before September 11, Coulter "would have faced swift repudiation from her colleagues", but "now it's accepted as legitimate commentary".

One day after the attacks, when death toll estimates were higher than later, Coulter asserted that only Muslims could have been behind them: "Not all Muslims may be terrorists, but all terrorists are Muslims—at least all terrorists capable of assembling a murderous plot against America that leaves 7,000 people dead in under two hours."

Coulter was highly critical in 2002 of the U.S. Department of Transportation and especially its then-secretary Norman Mineta. Her many criticisms include their refusal to use racial profiling as a component of passenger security screening. After a group of Muslims was expelled from a US Airways flight when other passengers expressed concern, sparking a call for Muslims to boycott the airline because of the ejection from a flight of six imams, Coulter wrote, "If only we could get Muslims to boycott all airlines, we could dispense with airport security altogether."

Coulter also cited the 2002 Senate testimony of FBI whistleblower Coleen Rowley, who was acclaimed for condemning her superiors for refusing to authorize a search warrant for 9-11 conspirator Zacarias Moussaoui when he refused to consent to a search of his computer. They knew that he was a Muslim in flight school who had overstayed his visa, and the French Intelligence Service had confirmed his affiliations with radical fundamentalist Islamic groups. Coulter said she agreed that probable cause existed in the case, but that refusing consent, being in flight school and overstaying a visa should not constitute grounds for a search.

Citing a poll which found that 98 percent of Muslims between the ages of 20 and 45 said they would not fight for Britain in the war in Afghanistan, and that 48 percent said they would fight for Osama bin Laden, she asserted "any Muslim who has attended a mosque in Europe—certainly in England, where Moussaoui lived—has had 'affiliations with radical fundamentalist Islamic groups,'" so that she parsed Rowley's position as meaning that "'probable cause' existed to search Moussaoui's computer because he was a Muslim who had lived in England". Coulter says the poll was "by The Daily Telegraph". It was by Sunrise, an "Asian", an Indian subcontinent-oriented, radio station, canvassing the opinions of 500 Muslims in Greater London, not Britain as a whole, mainly of Pakistani origin and aged between 20 and 45. Because "FBI headquarters ... refused to engage in racial profiling", they failed to uncover the 9-11 plot, Coulter asserted. "The FBI allowed thousands of Americans to be slaughtered on the altar of political correctness. What more do liberals want?".

Coulter wrote in another column that she had reviewed the civil rights lawsuits against certain airlines to determine which of them had subjected Arabs to the most "egregious discrimination" so that she could fly only that airline. She also said that the airline should be bragging instead of denying any of the charges of discrimination brought against them. In an interview with The Guardian she said, "I think airlines ought to start advertising: 'We have the most civil rights lawsuits brought against us by Arabs.'" When the interviewer, Jonathan Freedland, replied by asking what Muslims would do for travel, she responded, "They could use flying carpets."

In the wake of the Boston Marathon bombing, Coulter told Hannity host Sean Hannity that the wife of bombing suspect Tamerlan Tsarnaev should be jailed for wearing a hijab. Coulter continued by saying "Assimilating immigrants into our culture isn't really working. They're assimilating us into their culture."

=== Judaism ===
Coulter was accused of antisemitism in an October 8, 2007, interview with Donny Deutsch on The Big Idea. During the interview, Coulter stated that the United States is a Christian nation, and said that she wants "Jews to be perfected, as they say" (referring to them being converted to Christianity). Deutsch, a practicing Jew, implied that this was an antisemitic remark, but Coulter said she did not consider it to be a hateful comment. Coulter's comments on the show were condemned by the Anti-Defamation League, American Jewish Committee and Bradley Burston, and the National Jewish Democratic Council asked media outlets to cease inviting Coulter as a guest commentator.

Talk show host Dennis Prager, while disagreeing with her comments, said that they were not "anti-semitic", noting, "There is nothing in what Ann Coulter said to a Jewish interviewer on CNBC that indicates she hates Jews or wishes them ill, or does damage to the Jewish people or the Jewish state. And if none of those criteria is present, how can someone be labeled anti-Semitic?" Conservative activist David Horowitz also defended Coulter against the allegation.

=== 2013 CPAC Conference ===
In March 2013, Coulter was one of the keynote speakers at the Conservative Political Action Conference, where she made references to New Jersey governor Chris Christie's weight ("CPAC had to cut back on its speakers this year about 300 pounds") and progressive activist Sandra Fluke's hairdo. Coulter quipped that Fluke didn't need birth control pills because "that haircut is birth control enough". Coulter advocated against a path to citizenship for undocumented immigrants because such new citizens would never vote for Republican candidates: "If amnesty goes through, America becomes California and no Republican will ever win another election."

=== VDARE ===
Since 2013, Coulter has been a contributor to VDARE, a far-right website and blog founded by anti-immigration activist and paleo-conservative Peter Brimelow. Michael Malice has said that "Coulter and VDARE can be considered the furthest edge of the Overton Window" as any political position further to the right would be too heretical to find mainstream success. VDARE is controversial because of its alleged white supremacist rhetoric and support of scientific racism and white nationalism.

=== Native Americans ===
In a 2025 response to professor Melanie Yazzie saying "the goal is to dismantle the settler project that is the United States", Coulter tweeted, "We didn't kill enough Indians". Her comments were labeled hate speech by Cherokee Nation Principal Chief Chuck Hoskin Jr.

=== Tim Walz's son ===
In August 2024, Coulter received widespread criticism for a tweet with the comment "Talk about weird ...", referring to Democratic vice presidential nominee Tim Walz's 17-year-old son, who has nonverbal learning disorder, crying during his father's acceptance speech at the 2024 Democratic National Convention. Elizabeth Booker Houston launched a scathing viral rebuke. Coulter's tweet was deleted shortly after it was posted.

== Candidate endorsements ==
Coulter initially supported George W. Bush's presidency, but later criticized its approach to immigration. She endorsed Duncan Hunter and later Mitt Romney in the 2008 Republican presidential primaries and the 2012 Republican presidential primary and presidential run. In the 2016 Republican Party presidential primaries, she endorsed Donald Trump. Coulter later distanced herself from Trump following arguments over immigration policies. In September 2017 she called for his impeachment, saying "Put a fork in Trump, he's dead".

In 2018, she described herself as a "former Trumper". In a 2020 speech to a Turning Point USA event, she said, "The Trump agenda without Trump would be a lot easier. Our new motto should be 'Going on with Trumpism without Trump.' That's a winning strategy." Coulter blamed Trump's son-in-law and advisor Jared Kushner for Trump's 2020 election loss, and said that Trump had failed to deliver for the white working class.

In August 2024, Coulter spoke out against Donald Trump, saying he was an "awful, awful person." However, she said she would vote for him in the 2024 election because she liked his running mate JD Vance and how we needed "a wall on the border". "Can't trust Trump as far as I can throw him, but I do trust JD Vance to care about the left behind people", Coulter said.

Other candidates Coulter has endorsed include Greg Brannon (2014 Republican primary candidate for North Carolina Senator), Paul Nehlen (2016 Republican primary candidate for Wisconsin's 1st congressional district in the United States House of Representatives), Mo Brooks (2017 Republican primary candidate for Alabama Senator), and Roy Moore (2017 Republican candidate for Alabama Senator).

== Personal life ==
Coulter has been engaged several times, but she has never married and has no children. She has dated Spin founder and publisher Bob Guccione Jr. and conservative writer Dinesh D'Souza. In October 2007, she began dating Andrew Stein, the former president of the New York City Council, a liberal Democrat. On January 7, 2008, however, Stein told the New York Post that the relationship was over, citing irreconcilable differences.

In 2013 it was reported that Coulter was dating actor Jimmie Walker. Coulter responded to the rumors by saying, "He's the one spreading that [dating] rumor! No, we're great friends. We do a lot of stuff together. … He is so hilarious, so I see him a lot when I'm in L.A., but we are not technically dating." In 2017, Norman Lear, who created the television sitcom Good Times in which Walker starred, said of Walker "I love him; he's a wonderful guy. But I'll tell you something about him that'll astound you: He dates Ann Coulter." Coulter responded to Lear's comments by saying "This rumor spreads every now and then, but it's never been true. We're great friends. He's hilarious and a Republican. Now, that's news!"

Kellyanne Conway, who refers to Coulter as a friend, told New York magazine in 2017 that Coulter "started dating her security guard probably ten years ago because she couldn't see anybody else".

Coulter owns a house, bought in 2005, in Palm Beach, Florida, a condominium in Manhattan, and an apartment in Los Angeles. She was a voter in Connecticut in 2004 before moving to Palm Beach.

In a 2016 essay for The Hollywood Reporter Coulter discussed her long-standing love of the Grateful Dead, saying she attended approximately 67 Grateful Dead shows, referring to herself as a deadhead, and explaining how being a fan of the countercultural band did not conflict with her conservative beliefs.

== Bibliography ==
- Coulter, Ann H. (1998). High Crimes and Misdemeanors: The Case Against Bill Clinton. Washington, D.C.; Lanham, MD: Regnery Pub. ISBN 978-0-89526-360-5.
- —— (2002). Slander: Liberal Lies About the American Right. New York: Crown. ISBN 978-1-4000-4661-4.
- —— (2003). Treason: Liberal Treachery from the Cold War to the War on Terrorism. New York: Crown Forum. ISBN 978-1-4000-5030-7.
- —— (2004). How to Talk to a Liberal (If You Must): The World According to Ann Coulter. New York: Crown Forum. ISBN 978-1-4000-5418-3.
- —— (2006). Godless: The Church of Liberalism. New York: Crown Forum. ISBN 978-1-4000-5420-6.
- —— (2007). If Democrats Had Any Brains, They'd Be Republicans. New York: Crown Forum. ISBN 978-0-307-35345-0.
- —— (2009). Guilty: Liberal "Victims" and Their Assault on America. New York: Crown Forum. ISBN 978-0-307-35346-7.
- —— (2011). Demonic: How the Liberal Mob Is Endangering America. New York: Crown Forum. ISBN 978-0-307-35348-1.
- —— (2012). Mugged: Racial Demagoguery from the Seventies to Obama. New York: Sentinel. ISBN 978-1-59523-099-7.
- —— (2013). Never Trust a Liberal Over 3 – Especially a Republican. Washington, D.C.: Regnery Publishing. ISBN 978-1-62157-191-9.
- —— (2015). Adios, America: The Left's Plan to Turn Our Country into a Third World Hellhole. Washington, D.C.: Regnery Publishing. ISBN 978-1-62157-267-1.
- —— (2016). In Trump We Trust: E Pluribus Awesome!. New York: Sentinel. ISBN 978-0-7352-1446-0.
- —— (2018). Resistance Is Futile! How the Trump-Hating Left Lost Its Collective Mind. New York: Sentinel. ISBN 978-0-525-54007-6.
