= Kimberly Kagan =

American military historian (born 1972)

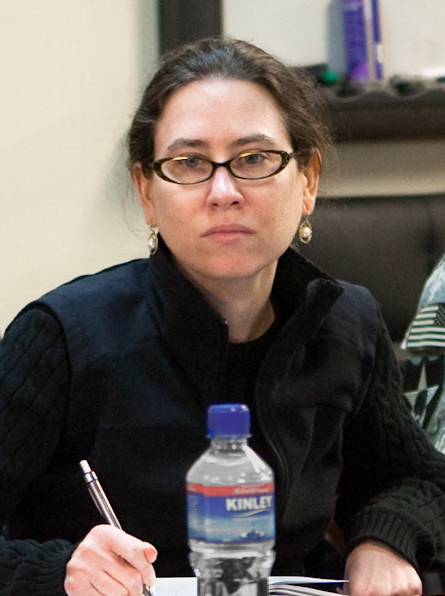
- Kimberly Kagan, 2010
- Born: 1972 (age 53–54)
- Education: PhD, ancient history
- Alma mater: Yale University
- Employer: Institute for the Study of War

Kimberly Ellen Kagan (born 1972) is an American military historian. She founded and heads the Institute for the Study of War and has taught at West Point, Yale, Georgetown University, and American University. Kagan has published in the Wall Street Journal, the New York Times, the Weekly Standard and elsewhere. In 2009, she served on Afghanistan commander General Stanley McChrystal's strategic assessment team.

== Early life ==
Kimberly Kagan is the daughter of Kalman Kessler, a Jewish accountant and school teacher from New York City and his wife Frances. Brother of Eric. She received her BA (1993) in classical civilization and her PhD in history from Yale University. At Yale, Kagan met her husband Frederick Kagan, who is an American resident scholar at the American Enterprise Institute (AEI), son of historian Donald Kagan, and brother of writer and publicist Robert Kagan.

Kagan held an Olin Postdoctoral Fellowship in Military History at Yale in International Security Studies from 2004–2005. She is an affiliate of Harvard's Olin Institute for Strategic Studies, where she was a National Security Fellow from 2002–2003.

== Career ==
She served on the Joint Campaign Plan Assessment Team for Multi-National Force-Iraq-U.S. Mission Iraq in October 2008, and as part of the Civilian Advisory Team for the CENTCOM strategic review in January 2009. Kagan served in Kabul as a member of General Stanley McChrystal's strategic assessment team, composed of civilian experts, during his strategic review in June and July 2009. She and her husband returned to Afghanistan in the summer of 2010 to assist General David Petraeus with transition tasks following his assumption of command in Afghanistan. They were granted "top secret" clearance, and spent hours analyzing intercepted transmissions of the Taliban. Their assessment that US forces should attack the Haqqani network was communicated directly to field commanders in the east, creating some confusion since Petraeus did not issue this command himself. Kagan also serves on the Academic Advisory Board at the Afghanistan-Pakistan Center of Excellence at CENTCOM.

Kagan is the founder (2007) and President of the Institute for the Study of War (ISW). ISW describes itself as a "non-partisan non-profit think tank which seeks to provide research and analysis specifically regarding issues of defense and foreign affairs. ISW produces comprehensive reports on the realities of war; focusing on military operations, enemy threats, and political trends in diverse conflict zones".

Kagan supported the 2007 troop surge in Iraq and subsequently advocated for an expanded and restructured American military campaign in Afghanistan.

On May 25, 2010, Kagan participated in a briefing on Capitol Hill focusing on Iraq's political crisis that included remarks from Iraqi Ambassador Samir Sumaidaie and Kenneth Pollack, Senior Fellow at the Brookings Institution. Kagan also participated in a Brookings Institution event entitled "Prospects for Afghanistan's Future: Assessing the Outcome of the Afghan Presidential Election" alongside Michael E. O'Hanlon.

The ISW funded the creation of a 34-minute documentary, The Surge: the Untold Story with CIA Director General David Petraeus, ISW Chairman, U.S Army General Jack Keane (ret.) and Lieutenant General James Dubik (ret.) describing the surge strategy in Iraq and how some high-ranking US officers claim to have pacified the country and thus won the war.

Kagan is an advisory board member of Spirit of America, a 501(c)(3) organization that supports the safety and success of Americans serving abroad and the local people and partners they seek to help.

== Works ==
- Kagan, Kimberly, ed. (2010). The Imperial Moment (Hardcover ed.). Cambridge: Harvard University Press. ISBN 9780674035874.
- Kagan, Kimberly (2008). The Surge: A Military History (Hardcover ed.). Encounter Books. ISBN 978-1-59403-249-3.
- Kagan, Kimberly (2006). The Eye of Command (Hardcover ed.). Ann Arbor: University of Michigan Press. ISBN 978-0-472-11521-1.

Kagan has published numerous essays including "Don't Short-Circuit the Surge"; "How to Surge the Taliban"; and "Why the Taliban are Winning—For Now".
