= Frederick Kagan =

American academic and think tank member (born 1970)

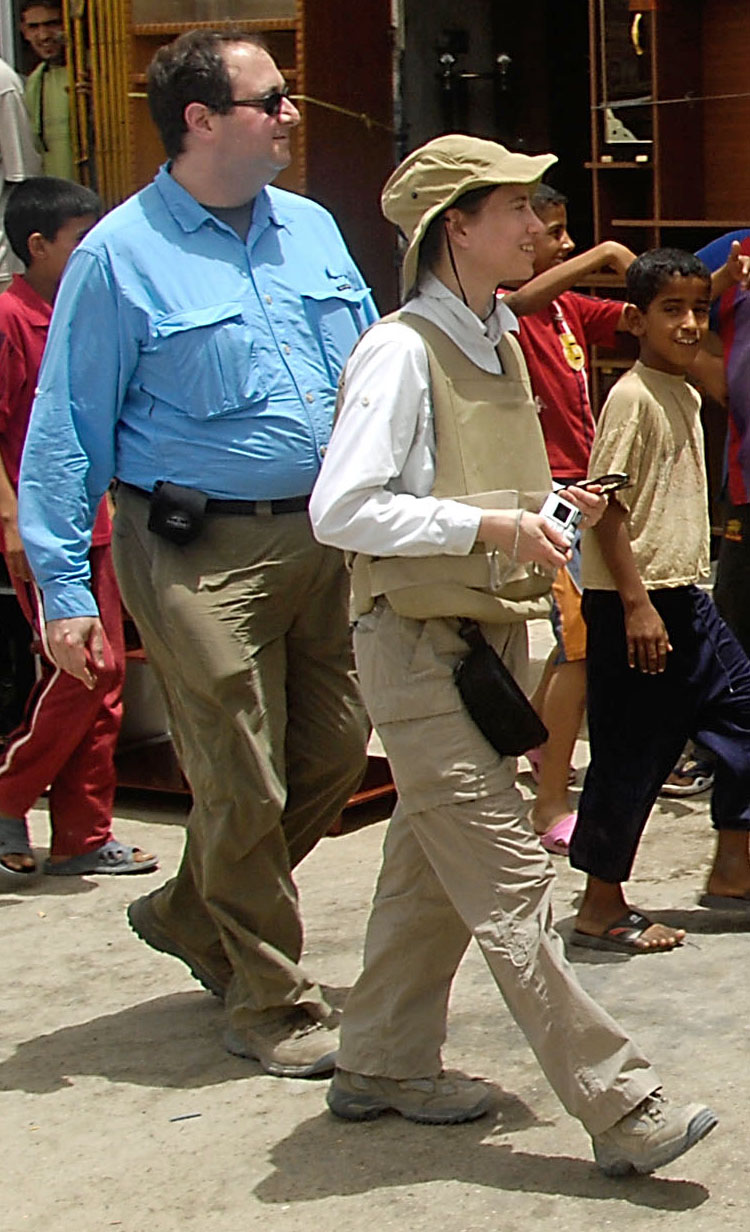
- Frederick and Kimberly Kagan touring Basra in 2008.
- Born: 1970 (age 55–56)
- Education: Yale University (BA, PhD)
- Occupation: Resident Scholar
- Employer: American Enterprise Institute
- Spouse: Kimberly Kagan
- Parent: Donald Kagan
- Relatives: Robert Kagan, brother
- Scientific career
- Thesis: Reform for survival: Russian military policy and conservative reform, 1825-1836 (1995)
- Doctoral advisor: Paul Kennedy

Frederick W. Kagan (born 1970) is an American resident scholar at the American Enterprise Institute (AEI) and a former professor of military history at the U.S. Military Academy at West Point.

== Career ==
He and his father, Donald Kagan, who was a professor at Yale and a fellow at the Hudson Institute, co-authored While America Sleeps: Self-Delusion, Military Weakness, and the Threat to Peace Today (2000). The book argued in favor of a large increase in military spending and warned of future threats, including from a potential revival of Iraq's weapons of mass destruction program. Frederick and Robert Kagan, who is a member of the Aspen Strategy Group, and their father, Donald, were all signatories to the Project for the New American Century manifesto, Rebuilding America's Defenses (2000).

== Influence ==
Kagan authored the "real Iraq Study Group" report as the American Enterprise Institute's rival to the Iraq Study Group report of James Baker and Lee H. Hamilton in December 2006. The AEI report, Choosing Victory: A Plan for Success in Iraq, was released on January 5, 2007, and Kagan was said to have won over the ear of President George W. Bush, strongly influencing his subsequent "surge" plan for changing the course of the Iraq War. Along with retired General Jack Keane, retired Colonel Joel Armstrong, and retired Major Daniel Dwyer, Kagan is credited as one of the "intellectual architects" of the surge plan. According to Foreign Policy magazine, Kagan's essay "We're Not the Soviets in Afghanistan" influenced the strategic thinking of US Defense Secretary Robert Gates, which reportedly influenced Gates's decision to support sending 30,000 additional troops to Afghanistan.

Reflecting on the surge in 2015, Kagan said that while the AEI group convened that "it never occurred to me or anybody that was involved in this that we were going to affect policy. It was simply 'Maybe we can put some concrete numbers on the table, some concrete enemy on a map, some concrete units on a grid, and force other people who want to have this discussion to wrestle with the specifics of the problem.'"

=== Advising David Petraeus ===
In 2010, U.S. Army General David H. Petraeus, who was appointed by President Barack Obama to head international forces in Afghanistan, hired Kagan as one of two experts on fighting corruption. An article in The Washington Post on December 19, 2012, discussed the relationship that the Kagans had with General Petraeus and, to a much lesser extent, with his successor in July 2011, General John R. Allen. It discussed various visits made by the Kagans from mid-2010, including their having been given access to the Combined Joint Intelligence Operations Center in Petraeus's headquarters. It commented on and raised questions about their sponsorship by defense contractors through the American Enterprise Institute. It also detailed how the Kagans had become involved in Iraq in 2007 under an initiative by General Stanley A. McChrystal, who was their first introduction to Afghanistan in 2010.

== 2022 Russian invasion of Ukraine ==
Kagan has regularly contributed to daily reports by the Institute for the Study of War (ISW) on the 2022 Russian invasion of Ukraine. The ISW was founded by his wife, Kimberly Kagan.

== Personal Life and Family ==
Kagan has one brother, Robert Kagan, a well-known foreign policy analyst. Frederick Kagan is married to Kimberly Kagan, president of the Institute for the Study of War. The couple met whilst studying together at Yale University.

== Bibliography ==
- The Military Reforms of Nicholas I: The Origins of the Modern Russian Army. St. Martin's Press. 1999. ISBN 0312219288. OCLC 40113408.
- The Military History of Tsarist Russia. Palgrave. 2002. ISBN 0312226357. OCLC 45799681. edited with Robin D. S. Higham
- The Military History of the Soviet Union. Palgrave. 2002. ISBN 0-312-29398-4. OCLC 49046824. edited with Robin D. S. Higham
- Leaders in War: West Point Remembers the 1991 Gulf War. Frank Cass. 2005. ISBN 0415350166. OCLC 55679032. edited with Christian Kubik
- The End of the Old Order: Napoleon and Europe, 1801–1805. Da Capo Books. 2006. ISBN 0-306-81137-5. OCLC 70714210.
- Finding the Target: the Transformation of American Military Policy. Encounter Books. 2006. ISBN 1-594-03150-9. OCLC 67375072.
- Ground Truth: The Future of U.S. Land Power. AEI Press. 2008. ISBN 978-0-844-74262-5. OCLC 213765941.with Thomas Donnelly
- Lessons for a Long War: How America Can Win on New Battlefields. AEI Press. 2010. ISBN 978-0-844-74284-7. OCLC 318421296. edited with Thomas Donnelly

== Recent publications ==
=== Articles ===
"China has three roads to Taiwan: The US must block them all", The Hill, March 13, 2023 (co-authored with Dan Blumenthal)
