= Donald Kagan =

American historian and classicist (1932–2021)

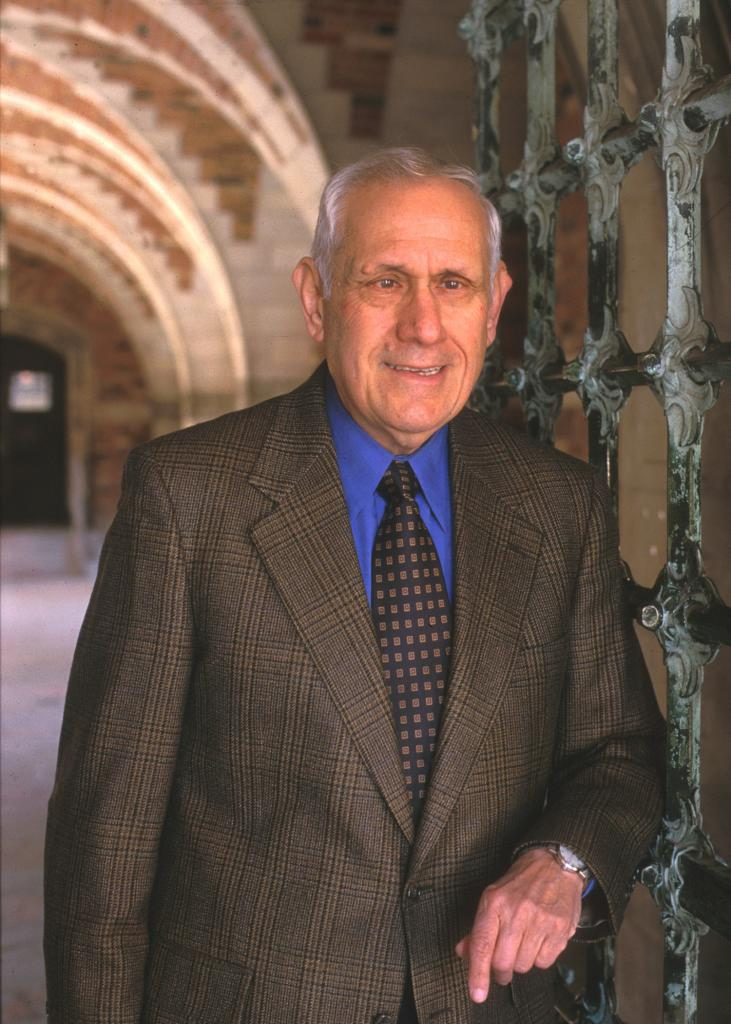
- Born: May 1, 1932; Kuršėnai, Lithuania
- Died: August 6, 2021 (aged 89); Washington, D.C., U.S.
- Spouse: Myrna Dabrusky (m. 1954; died 2017)
- Children: Robert; Frederick
- Awards: Phi Beta Kappa DeVane Medal (1975); National Humanities Medal – (2002); Honorary doctorate from Ohio State University (2013); Commander of the Order of the Phoenix (2021)

Academic background
- Education: Brooklyn College (BA); Brown University (MA); Ohio State University (PhD)
- Thesis: Politics and policy in Corinth (1958)
- Doctoral advisor: William F. McDonald

Academic work
- Discipline: Classics
- Institutions: Cornell University; Yale University
- Main interests: Peloponnesian War

Donald Kagan (/ˈkeɪɡən/; May 1, 1932 – August 6, 2021) was a Lithuanian-born American historian and classicist at Yale University specializing in ancient Greece. He formerly taught in the Department of History at Cornell University. Kagan was considered among the foremost American scholars of Greek history and is notable for his four-volume history of the Peloponnesian War.

== Early life and education ==
Kagan was born in Kuršėnai, Lithuania, on May 1, 1932, to a Jewish family. His father, Shmuel, died before Kagan turned two years old, and his mother, Leah (Benjamin), subsequently emigrated to the United States with Kagan and his sister. He grew up in the Brownsville section of Brooklyn. He attended Thomas Jefferson High School, where he played football, before becoming the first person in his family to go to college.

As a child, he developed an interest in European history, his initial goal was to become a high school teacher. At Brooklyn College, he was inspired by Meta Elizabeth Schutz to specialize in ancient history. He graduated from Brooklyn College in 1954, received a master's degree in classics from Brown University in 1955, and completed a Ph.D. in history from Ohio State University in 1958 with a dissertation titled Politics and Policy in Corinth.

== Academic career ==
External videos
- Booknotes interview with Kagan on On the Origins of War, March 12, 1995, C-SPAN
- Presentation by Donald Kagan and Frederick Kagan on While America Sleeps, November 29, 2000, C-SPAN
- Presentation by Kagan on The Peloponnesian War, October 3, 2003, C-SPAN

Donald Kagan started to teach at Capital University during the last year of his doctorate. He then briefly taught at Pennsylvania State University, and then Cornell University from 1960 to 1969, where he received two teaching awards. He started working at Yale University in 1969 and he remained there for the next 44 years until his retirement in 2013.

At Yale he held a series of endowed professorships of increasing seniority: the Colgate Professor of History and Classics (1979), the Bass Professor of History, Classics, and Western Civilization (1991), the Hillhouse Professor of History and Classics (1995), and finally the Sterling Professor of Classics and History, Yale's highest faculty honor, from 2002 until his retirement. He also held several administrative posts at Yale: he served twice as chairman of the Department of Classics. Additionally, he was Master of Timothy Dwight College from 1976 to 1978, Acting Director of Athletics from 1987 to 1988, and Dean of Yale College from 1989 to 1992.

His course Historical Studies in the Origins of War, launched shortly after he joined Yale's faculty, drew hundreds of students each fall for decades and formed the basis of a book he published in 1995 called On the Origins of War and the Preservation of Peace. He also taught Introduction to Ancient Greek History, recorded for Open Yale Courses in 2007, as well as upper level History and Classical Civilization seminars ranging on topics from Thucydides to the Lacedaemonian hegemony.

== Scholarship ==
=== The Peloponnesian War ===
Kagan wrote a comprehensive narrative history about the Peloponnesian War (431–404 BC) consisting of four volumes, published by Cornell University Press between 1969 and 1987. The series approaches the war primarily as political and military history rather than social or economic history, with each volume challenging a specific aspect of Thucydides's account.

Volume 1: The Outbreak of the Peloponnesian War (1969) covers the first Peloponnesian war and the Thirty Years' Peace. Kagan organized the volume around a single question: Was the war inevitable, or could it have been avoided? Rather than accepting Thucydides's own view that the growth of Athenian power made conflict with Sparta unavoidable, Kagan examined the war's individual decision points one by one, asking at each whether a different choice had been possible. He concluded that the war was not inevitable: there were multiple points at which it could have been averted, and responsibility for its outbreak lay with the specific decisions made by Corinthian, Spartan and Athenian leaders at those moments, not with impersonal historical forces.

Volume 2: The Archidamian War (1974) covers the period of conflict from 432 to 421, known as the Archidamian War. In it he follows an annalistic tradition and gives a critique of the historiography of the war. Kagan reassesses the strategies of Pericles, Cleon, and Demosthenes as presented by Thucydides.

Volume 3: The Peace of Nicias and the Sicilian Expedition (1981) covers the years from the signing of the peace treaty of Nicias and to the end of the Athenian expedition to Sicily in 413 BC. Kagan argues that Thucydides assigns Nicias less blame for the disaster than he deserved, instead attributing the catastrophe chiefly to the post-Periclean democracy.

Volume 4: The Fall of the Athenian Empire (1987) covers the period from 413 BC to the Athenian surrender in 404 BC. Kagan traces the war's final phase through the decisions of figures including Alcibiades, Lysander, and Cyrus the Younger. The volume's later chapters emphasize the Spartan-Persian accord as decisive to Athens's ultimate defeat, alongside the shortcomings of the restored democracy that governed Athens after the oligarchic coup of 411 BC.

In addition to Thucydides, Kagan also relies on other ancient sources like Diodorus Siculus, Plutarch and Xenophon, especially after 411 BC when Thucydides's own history abruptly ends. In the preface to the first volume, Kagan acknowledged his particular debt to A. W. Gomme's A Historical Commentary on Thucydides and Jacqueline de Romilly's Thucydide et l'impérialisme athénien.

Kagan continued to develop the ideas underlying the Peloponnesian War tetralogy in later, related works aimed at general readers. In 1991 he published Pericles of Athens and the Birth of Democracy, a biography that extended the critical reassessment of Pericles begun in The Archidamian War into a full portrait. In 2003 Kagan condensed the full tetralogy into a single volume, The Peloponnesian War. In Thucydides: The Reinvention of History (2009), Kagan turned his attention from the war itself to Thucydides as a historian; a review in the Bryn Mawr Classical Review noted that substantial portions of the book drew on his earlier writings, largely without acknowledgment.

=== On the Origins of War and the Preservation of Peace ===
On the Origins of War and the Preservation of Peace, is a comparative history examining four major wars (the Peloponnesian War, World War I, the Second Punic War, and World War II) and one crisis that did not lead to war (the Cuban Missile Crisis) with the purpose of identifying how and why wars do or do not begin. Kagan grounded his analysis in what he identified as Thucydides's own triad of motives for war: fear, honor, and interest. Remarking in 2015 on the work that while fear and interest are readily accepted as causes of conflict, "nobody takes honor seriously." Reworking honor as "prestige," he argued it was a decisive factor in the outbreak of World War I.

Kagan approached the statesmen in each crisis sympathetically, seeking to understand their reasoning, while still assigning responsibility for their failures, most pointedly in his critical account of John F. Kennedy's handling of the Bay of Pigs invasion, the Vienna summit, and the Berlin Wall crisis in the lead-up to the missile crisis.

== Reception ==
In his The New Yorker review, George Steiner said of Kagan's four-volume history of the Peloponnesian War: "The temptation to acclaim Kagan's four volumes as the foremost work of history produced in North America in this century is vivid."

== Political views ==
Donald Kagan's political views underwent a significant shift around 1969, moving from liberalism towards neoconservatism. This change occurred following gun-armed student protests at Cornell University, which led to the establishment of a Black Studies program following the student occupation of Willard Straight Hall. This enraged Kagan as he compared the decision to former British Prime Minister Neville Chamberlain's appeasement of the Nazis in the 1930s. He then subsequently left for Yale University. He became one of the original signatories of the 1997 Statement of Principles by the neoconservative think tank Project for the New American Century, co-founded by his son Robert. In the lead-up to the 2000 presidential elections, Kagan and his other son, Frederick, published While America Sleeps, advocating for increased defense spending.

== Personal life and family ==
Kagan married Myrna Dabrusky in 1954. They met while studying at Thomas Jefferson High School together, and remained married for 62 years until her death in 2017. She was a schoolteacher who also wrote two histories of New Haven, Vision in the Sky: New Haven's Early Years, 1638–1784 and Puritans to Yankees: New Haven's Growing Years, 1783–1861. Together, they had two children: Robert and Frederick. Robert married American diplomat Victoria Nuland, and Frederick married military historian Kimberly Kagan, founder and president of the Institute for the Study of War.

Kagan died on August 6, 2021, at a retirement home in Washington, D.C. He was 89 years old.

== Awards ==
For his teaching, he was awarded the DeVane Medal in 1975 and the Byrnes/Sewall Teaching Prize in 1998.

The National Endowment for the Humanities (NEH) awarded Kagan the National Humanities Medal in 2002 and selected him to deliver the 2005 Jefferson Lecture. Kagan titled his lecture "In Defense of History"; he argued that history is of primary importance in the study of the humanities. He stated that "Crafting strong narratives and restoring value judgments to those tales are key elements to protecting history's usefulness in the humanities." In the lecture, Kagan criticized postmodern and relativist trends in the humanities.

Kagan received an honorary doctorate from Ohio State University in 2013 and the Order of the Phoenix in 2021.

== Positions held ==
- 1972–1975 Chairman of the classics department, Yale University
- 1976–1978 Master, Timothy Dwight College
- 1987–1988 Acting Director of Athletics, Yale University
- 1988–1993 Member of the National Council on the Humanities
- 1989–1992 Dean, Yale College
- 2002–2013 Sterling Professor of Classics and History, Yale University

== Works ==
- Kagan, Donald. (1962). Decline and fall of the Roman empire: why did it collapse?. Lexington, Mass.: Heath.
- Kagan, Donald. (1965). The Great Dialogue: A History of Greek Political Thought from Homer to Polybius. New York: Free Press. OCLC 63980809
- Kagan, Donald. (1965). Sources in greek political thought: from Homer to Polybius. New York: Free Press.
- Kagan, Donald. (1966). Problems in ancient history 1 : The ancient Near East and Greece. London: Collier-Macmillan
- Kagan, Donald. (1966). Problems in ancient history 2 : The Roman world. London: Collier-Macmillan
- Kagan, Donald. (1969). The Outbreak of the Peloponnesian War. Ithaca: Cornell University Press. ISBN 0-8014-0501-7.
- Kagan, Donald. (1974). The Archidamian War. Ithaca: Cornell University Press. ISBN 0-8014-0889-X.
- Kagan, Donald. (1975). Studies in the Greek historians: in memory of Adam Parry. Cambridge: Cambridge University Press
- Kagan, Donald. (1981). The Peace of Nicias and the Sicilian Expedition. Ithaca: Cornell University Press. ISBN 0-8014-1367-2.
- Kagan, Donald. (1987). The Fall of the Athenian Empire. Ithaca: Cornell University Press. ISBN 0-8014-1935-2
- Kagan, Donald. (1991). Pericles of Athens and the Birth of Democracy. New York: The Free Press. ISBN 0-684-86395-2.
- Kagan, Donald, L. Pearce Williams, and Brian Tierney (1992). Great issues in Western civilization: 2 : From Louis XIV through the cold war. New York: McGraw-Hill
- Kagan, Donald. (1995). On the Origins of War and the Preservation of Peace. New York: Doubleday. ISBN 0-385-42374-8.
- Kagan, Donald and Kagan, Frederick. (2000). While America Sleeps. New York: St. Martin's Press. ISBN 0-312-20624-0.
- Kagan, Donald, Craig, Albert M., Graham, William A., Ozment, Steven, and Turner, Frank M. (2000). The Heritage of World Civilizations. ISBN 978-0130160430
- Kagan, Donald, Ozment, Steven, and Turner, Frank M. (2003). The Western Heritage. New York: Prentice Hall. ISBN 0-13-182839-8.
- Kagan, Donald. (2003). The Peloponnesian War. New York: Viking Press. ISBN 0-670-03211-5.
- Kagan, Donald. (2009). Thucydides: The Reinvention of History. New York: Viking Press. ISBN 0-670-02129-6.
- Kagan, Donald. (2013). Men of Bronze: Hoplite Warfare in Ancient Greece. Princeton University Press. ISBN 978-1400846306
