= The Western Heritage =

American history textbook covering Western civilization and European history

- First edition
- Author: Donald Kagan, Steven Ozment, and Frank M. Turner
- Language: English
- Subject: Western history
- Publisher: Macmillan
- Publication date: 1979
- Publication place: United States
- Pages: 220
- ISBN: 0-02-361840-X
- OCLC: 134198
- Dewey Decimal: 909.09821
- LC Class: CB245

The Western Heritage is an American history textbook used for the study of Western civilization and European history. It was published in 1979, and has gone through twelve editions. It was written by Donald Kagan, Steven Ozment, and Frank M. Turner. It soon became a "standard survey text" and is published in two volumes. Contributor Gregory F. Viggiano joined the authorship team during the preparation of the twelfth edition.

Considered conservative and old-fashioned when it was published (though with scholarship "entirely up to date"), reviewers chided it for ignoring the Byzantines and Ottomans as well as giving short shrift to Russia and Poland. Others indicated lack of attention to the role of the Islamic states and ignorance of Islamic sources. One reviewer included it among Western Civilization textbooks which "could be plausibly described as consistently following something close to a biblical-literalist line" on the history of Ancient Israel.

F.J. Nothling described the 2nd edition as "altogether a useful textbook for those who want a survey of the entire field." On the H-W-Civ network, David K. McQuilkin, reviewing a 1996 combined edition of the text, said, "The Western Heritage is a text that can be used by virtually any first-year college student. It is clear, concise functional, and adequately supported with recent historical scholarship. Moreover, the text achieves exactly what the authors intend it to achieve--that is, a succinct and balanced overview of Western culture and civilization suited to those whose knowledge of the subject is limited. Given this success, The Western Heritage has a definite place among current Western civilization textbooks, for it is compatible with a broad range of divergent teaching approaches and methodologies."
