= Britain's Imperial Air Routes, 1918 to 1939 =

1960 book by Robin Higham

Britain's Imperial Air Routes, 1918 to 1939: The Story of Britain's Overseas Airlines
- First edition, 1960.
- Author: Robin Higham
- Language: English
- Subject: History of aviation
- Publisher: G. T. Foulis
- Publication date: 1960 (revised 2016)
- ISBN: 978-1-78155-370-1
- OCLC: 2233645

Britain's Imperial Air Routes, 1918 to 1939: The Story of Britain's Overseas Airlines is a book by Robin Higham telling the history of the first twenty years of British air transport with an emphasis on the story of Imperial Airways and its predecessors. The book was first published by G. T. Foulis in 1960, with a revised version published by Fonthill in 2016.

In the book, Higham writes about the experience in Britain of connecting the British Empire via commercial flight, during the interwar years. From 1921 to 1924 British air transport companies were able to obtain subsidies from government and from 1924 increasing amounts were given to Imperial Airways. The book contains total British subsidies to air transport companies and traces air routes to Africa, Australia, India and North America.

== First edition ==
Britain's Imperial Air Routes, 1918 to 1939, written by Robin Higham, was first published by G. T. Foulis in 1960, and focuses on the first twenty years of British air transport, Imperial Airways and its predecessors. Funded by the research council of the North Carolina State University, Higham's studies traced air routes to Africa, Australia, India and North America.

In the book, Higham writes about the experience in Britain of connecting the British Empire via commercial flight, during the interwar years. It includes issues surrounding securing flying routes and landing rights, if and how civil aviation should be subsidized, and how it should be operated. The book begins with the story of four British companies. From 1921 to 1924 British air transport companies were able to obtain subsidies from government and from 1924 increasing amounts were given to Imperial Airways.

The book contains total British subsidies to air transport companies including for the Cairo to Karachi service, a weekly service by 1930 that Samuel Hoare had previously gained government financial assistance for when he was Secretary of State for Air. In his research, Higham studied the papers of George Edwards Woods Humphery, Imperial Airway's managing director, and showed previously unpublished accounts of 1922–23 of Daimler Airway. Debates in parliament are included. Higham explains in the book that from the late 1920s Imperial and KLM extended their international air links to serve their countries' respective colonial interests while the US Pan Am was developing intercontinental routes into South America.

== Revised edition ==
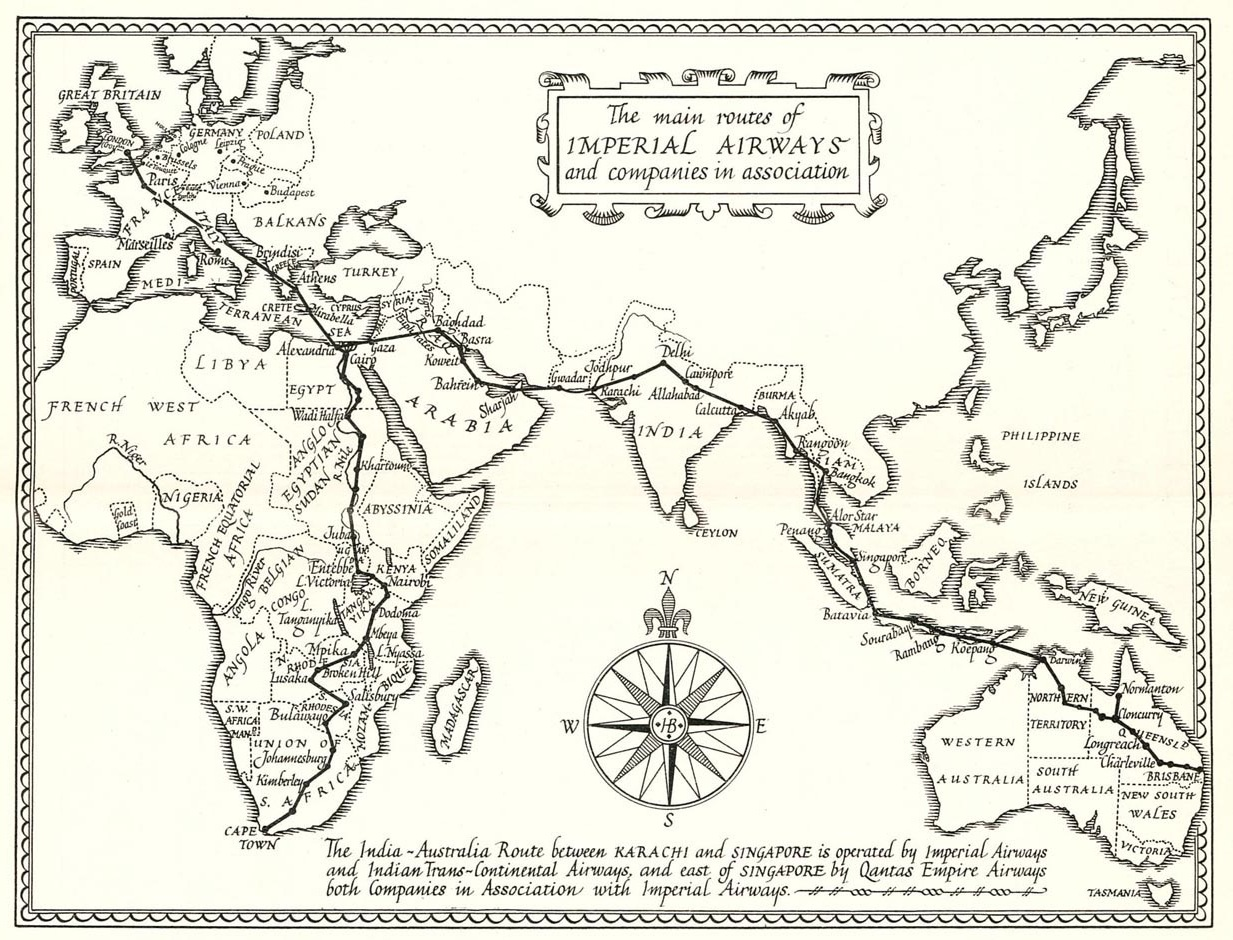
Imperial routes April 1935, as illustrated in the book

A revised version was published in 2016, by Fonthill. Covering 349 pages, the book contains 26 chapters, an introductory publisher's note, eight appendices, and endnotes. The book begins with a map of the India to Australia route between Karachi and Singapore, operated by Imperial Airways and India Trans-Continental Airways, and east of Singapore by Qantas Empire Airways, both in association with Imperial Airways, and ends with a bibliography, but without an index. There are 74 photographs occupying the centre pages, and a few further route maps interspersed on other pages, as well as several tables explaining costs.

== Reviews ==
In 1961, a review in the Journal of the Royal Aeronautical Society noted that despite some minor errors, the book to be a good summary of the first 20 years of British air transport and was based on much research. The review felt that Higham placed too much emphasis on government and not enough on the terrain where the route surveys were done. In Business History Review , the book was described as revealing the intermingling of business operations and public policy, and revealing that Higham felt that the British government had not handled the issue of commercial aviation effectively. The Journal of Modern History described the book as a "competent" study and hoped that a similar study of the history of civil aviation in the United States might be produced.

According to a doctoral thesis from Sheffield Hallam University in 2014, the original book was the official account of the study of the air route to India for over 50 years.

== Illustrations ==
Photographs in the book include Alcock and Brown and the world's first airline steward Jack Sanderson (age 14). The book also includes photographs of the chairmen and directors of Imperial Airways including Sir Eric Geddes, Sir George Beharrel and George Woods Humphery, and several aircraft.

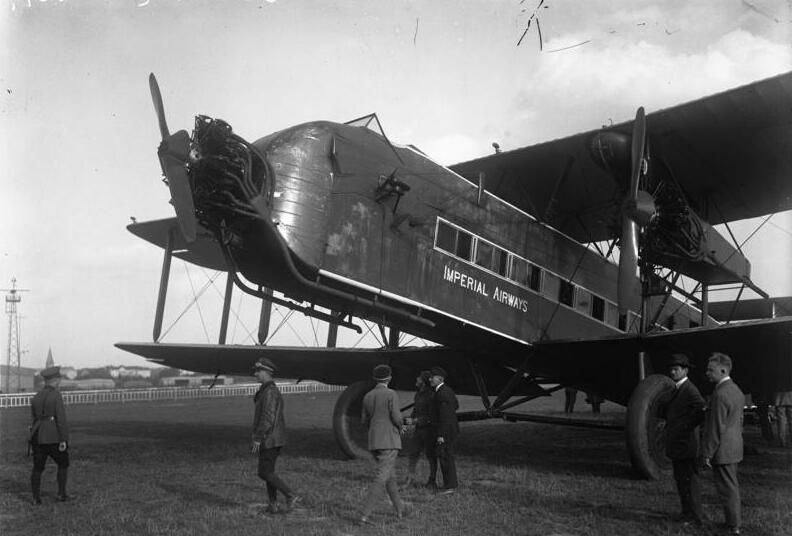
Armstrong Whitworth AW.154 Argosy at Berlin, 1928

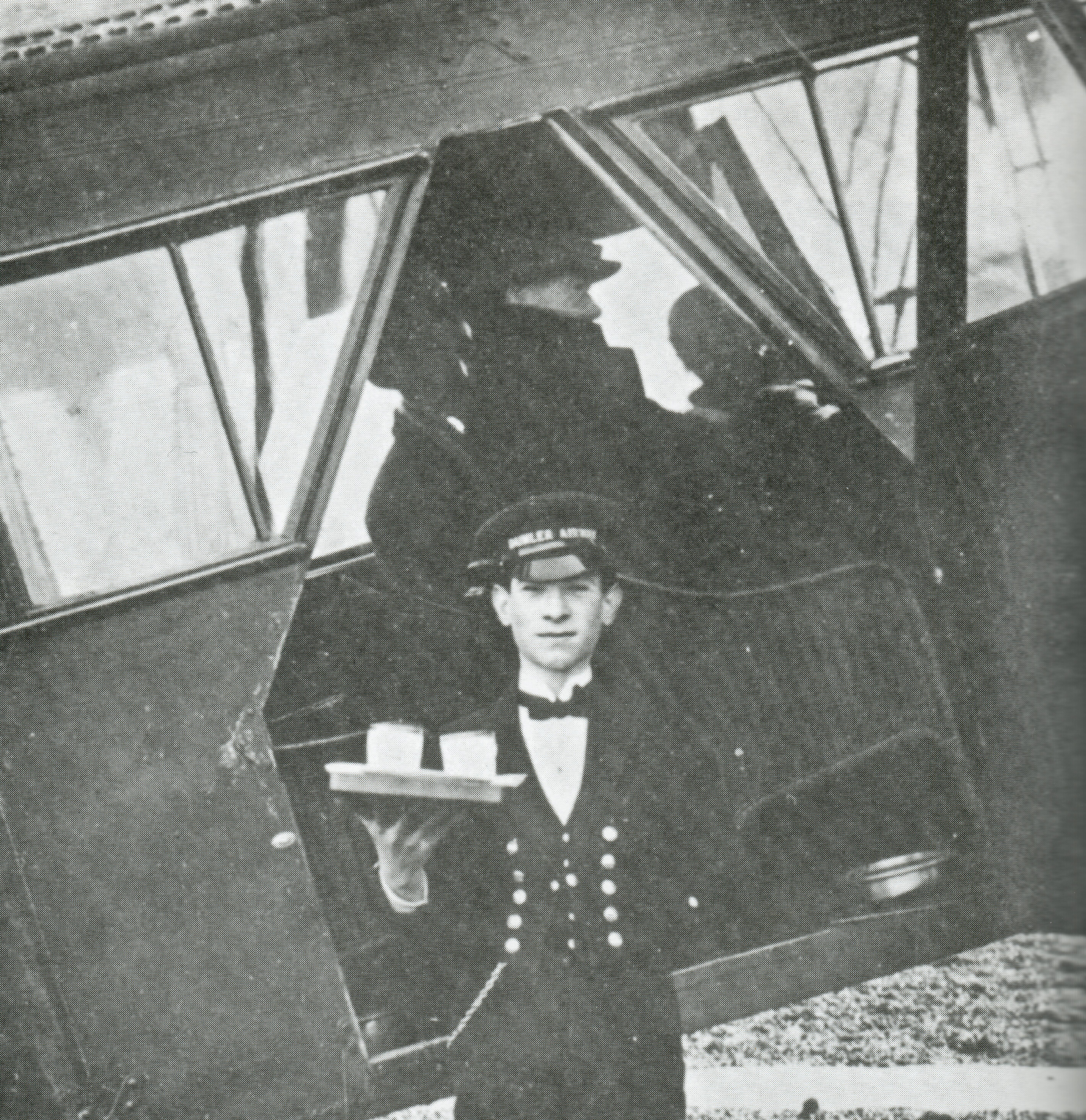
Jack Sanderson, the first flight steward on an aeroplane

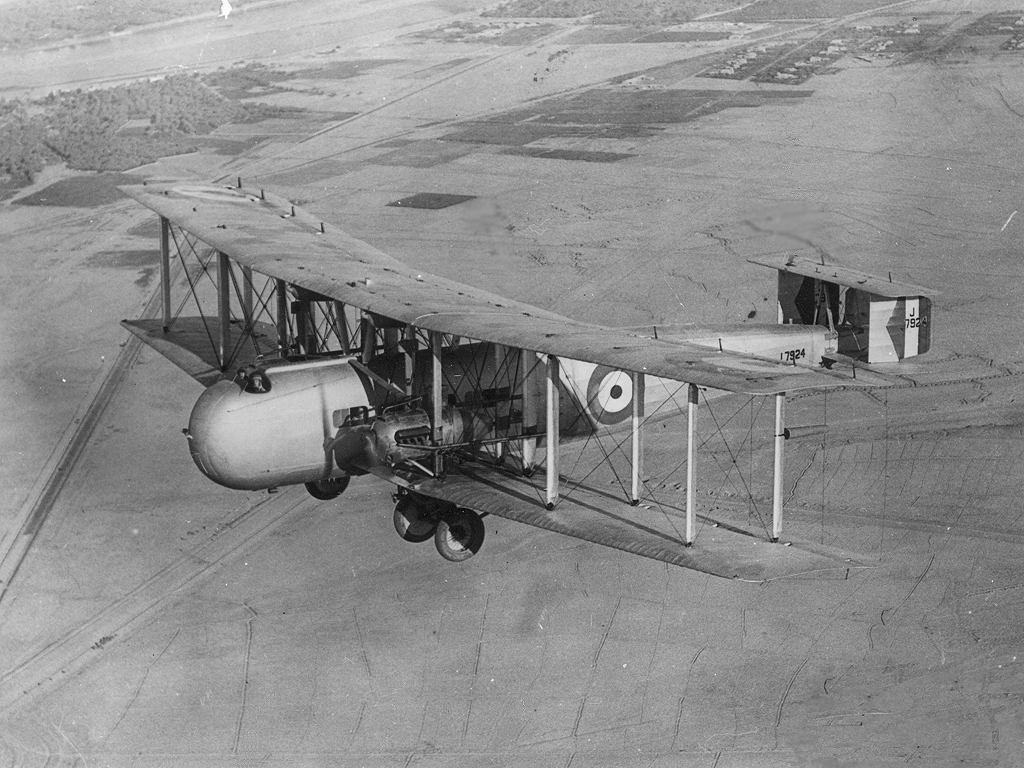
RAF Vickers Victoria J7924, photographed over Iraq

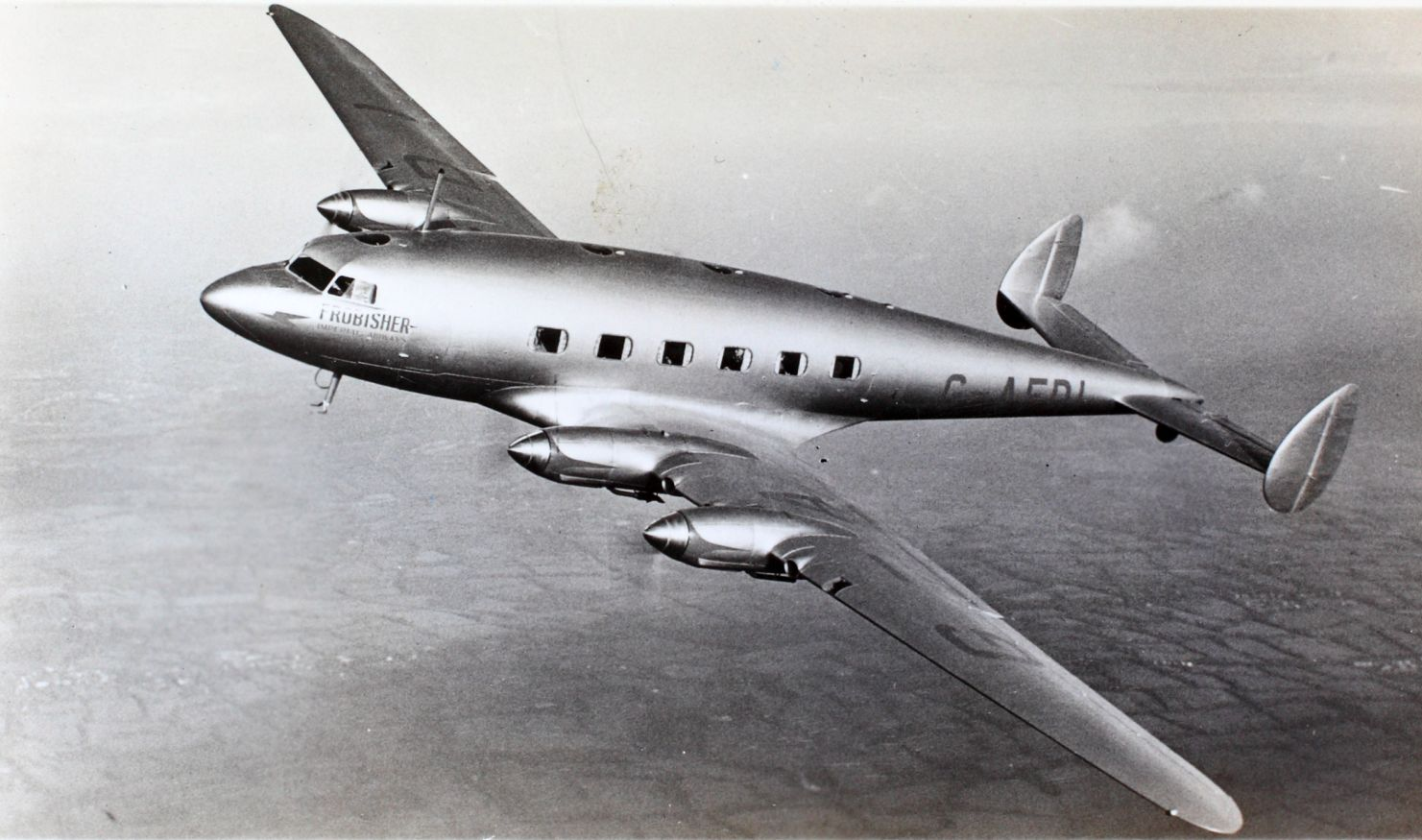
De Havilland D.H.91 Albatross (Frobisher)

== Versions ==
- First: Britain's Imperial Air Routes 1918 to 1939: The story of Britain's overseas airlines. G.T. Foulis. 1960. OCLC 2233645.
- Revised: Britain's Imperial Air Routes, 1918 to 1939: The story of Britain's overseas airlines (Revised ed.). Fonthill. 2016. ISBN 978-1-78155-370-1.
