= The History Press =

British publishing company

The History Press Ltd.
- Founded: 2007 (19 years ago)
- Country of origin: United Kingdom
- Headquarters location: Cheltenham, Gloucestershire
- Distribution: Macmillan Distribution (UK); Peribo (Australia); Independent Publishers Group (US)
- Publication types: Books
- Official website: thehistorypress.co.uk

The History Press is a British publishing company specialising in the publication of titles devoted to local and specialist history. It identifies itself as the United Kingdom's largest independent publisher in this field, publishing approximately 300 books per year and with a backlist of over 12,000 titles.

Created in December 2007, The History Press integrated core elements of the NPI Media Group within it, including all existing published titles, plus all the future contracts and publishing rights contained in them. At the time of founding, the imprints included Phillimore, Pitkin Publishing, Spellmount, Stadia, Sutton Publishing, Tempus Publishing and Nonsuch.

== History ==
The roots of The History Press's publishing heritage can be traced back to 1897 when William Phillimore founded a publishing business which still carries his name, however the company itself evolved from the amalgamation of multiple smaller publishing houses in 2007 that formed part of the NPI Media Group. The largest component of the NPI Media Group was Tempus Publishing, founded by Alan Sutton in 1993.

Tempus Publishing's early years were spent producing local history titles, principally books of old photographs depicting towns and villages throughout the UK. Tempus Publishing later opened offices in both the US and Europe, although these are no longer in use today by The History Press.

During the 1990s, the list diversified in a number of directions. Tempus Publishing produced their first books on archaeology, as well as books on more general history subjects. The organisation became a leading publisher of transport material including maritime history.

Local history remained the bedrock of Tempus Publishing with (at the time of amalgamation into The History Press) over 1500 titles now published. Tempus Publishing ceased operations in 2007 at the same time as the formation of The History Press and thereafter became an imprint.

THP Ireland is the award-winning Irish imprint of The History Press Group. Based in Dublin, it publishes a wide range of books including history, current affairs, biography, photography and historical fiction.

In 2017 the heritage Pitkin Publishing imprint series was sold to Pavilion Books.

== Offices ==
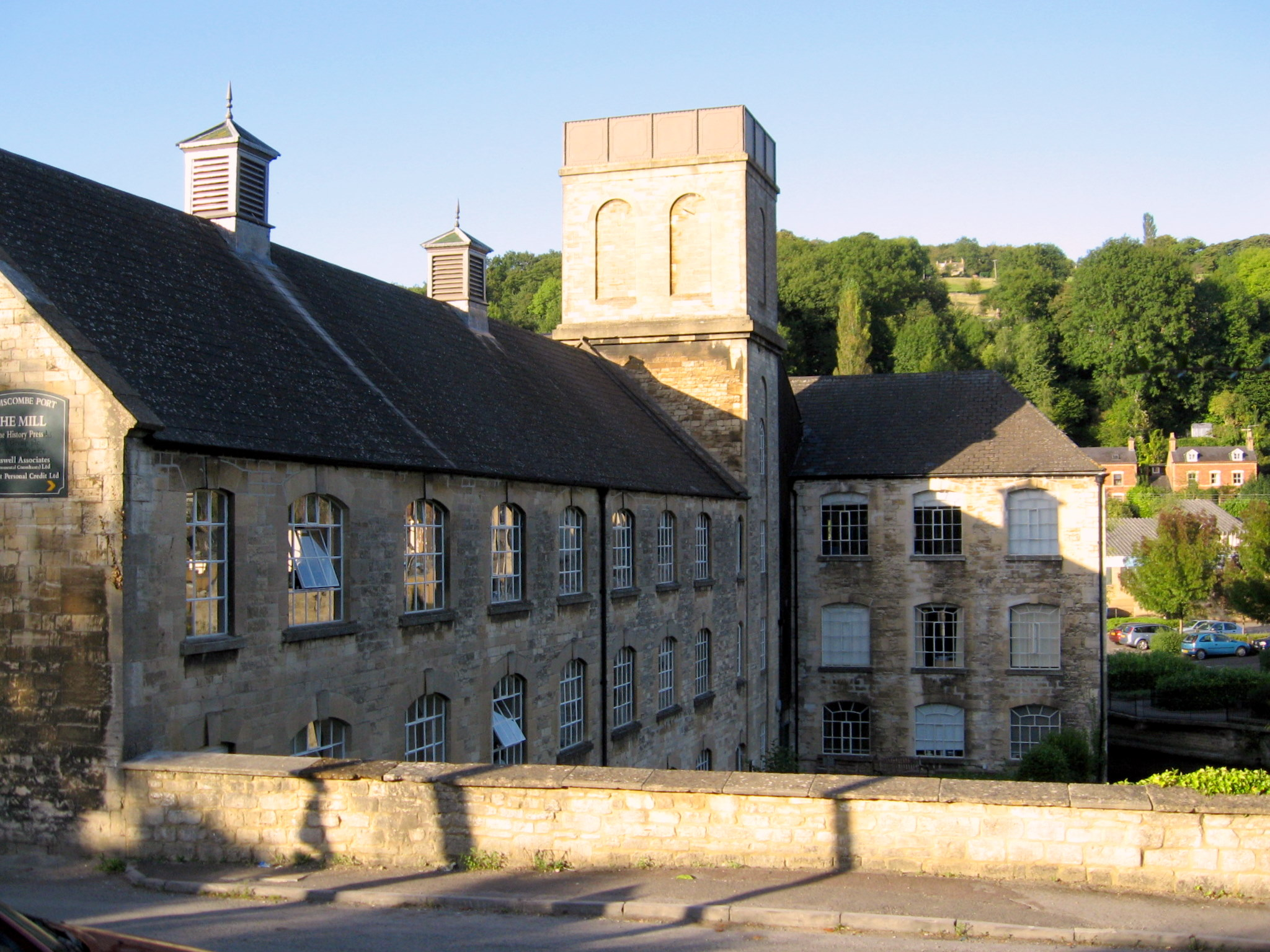
Port Mill, Brimscombe

Until 2019 The History Press was based in The Mill, Brimscombe Port, near Stroud in Gloucestershire, and then moved to central Cheltenham. Their head office is at 97 St. George's Place, Cheltenham, GL50 3QB.

== Books and genres ==
The core genres offered by The History Press can be broken into the following categories: Archaeology, The Arts, Biography, Crime History, Genealogy, General History (Ancient and Medieval through to Modern), Local History (broken into regions), Military History, The National Trust guidebooks, Royal History, Social History, Sport, Transport History (including Aviation, Railway, Maritime and Motoring) and Gift books. The Mystery Press imprint is home to The History Press' historical crime fiction books.

== See also ==
- List of publishing houses
- Everything Under The Sun (Pink Floyd book)
