= The World America Made =

2012 book by Robert Kagan

- First edition
- Authors: Robert Kagan
- Language: English
- Publisher: Alfred A. Knopf
- Publication date: 2012
- Pages: 149

The World America Made is a 2012 non-fiction book written by Robert Kagan. In it, Kagan argues against the retreat of the United States as the global superpower and suggests that maintaining the current American-led world order is good for democracy around the world. The book influenced President Barack Obama's 2012 State of the Union Address.

== Content ==
The book argues against a declinist view of American global influence, despite the 2008 financial crisis and the rise of China. Kagan compares the hypothesis of America's retreat as the world's superpower to the 1946 film It's a Wonderful Life, where the main character decides not to commit suicide after realizing how significant his contributions have been to the well-being of the world around him.

Kagan posits that "political and economic freedom combined with military strength as the foundation of the enduring American power" led to a "the current historical 'wave' towards democracy." He argues that this will only continue if the United States remains the global superpower, as opposed to the prospect of a post-nationalist and multipolar world. Indeed, he predicts an American retreat would resemble "the breakdown of the Roman Empire and the collapse of the European order in World War I."

== Critical reception ==
=== Background ===
The book was widely reviewed. It received both good and bad reviews. Moreover, an adapted except was published as an article in The Wall Street Journal on the day of its publication. The book also influenced the 2012 State of the Union Address given by President Barack Obama.

=== Negative reviews ===
In The New York Times, Michiko Kakutani criticized the book for its "fuzzy generalizations, debatable assertions and self-important declarations of the obvious." In comparison to Zbigniew Brzezinski's book Strategic Vision: America and the Crisis of Global Power, she argued it lacked "perspicuity." She added that some of Kagan's examples were "odd exercises in relativism or blatant rationalizations of current woes." She highlighted Kagan's "shaky reasoning" and "failure to grapple convincingly with crucial problems facing America today" as well as his "condescending tone" and "sometimes less than coherent reasoning." She concluded that it was disconcerting that both President Barack Obama and Governor Mitt Romney appreciated Kagan's scholarship.

In The National Review, Mark Steyn suggested that Kagan "prefer[red] to stick to big-picture generalizations, as if nervous his argument [wouldn't] withstand close contact with specifics," and criticized "Kagan's complacency." He added, "Kagan never defines terms" and asked, "What does Kagan mean by 'democracy'?." He went to say, "I had a strong urge [...] to toss the book out of the window and back my truck over it." Additionally, he derided Kagan's assertion that the smooth transfer of power from Britain to the United States would be comparable to a potential transfer of power from the United States to China, arguing that the latter nations were too different, both in terms of culture (language, freedom of speech, etc.), but also in terms of economic system (Communism as opposed to capitalism). In a muffled praise, he added "The nearest thing to an insight in Kagan's book comes toward the end when he states what ought to be obvious—that 'a liberal world order will only be supported by liberal nations.'"

In National Interest, Christopher A. Preble, a Fellow at the Cato Institute, a libertarian think tank, described the book as "a cri de coeur directed at a foreign—policy establishment beset by doubts and a wider public harboring even deeper ones." He added that Kagan's ideas were "shortsighted at best, harmful at worst." Instead, he argued, "The world is both more complicated and more durable than Kagan imagines," lamenting Kagan's "flawed analysis." However, he went on to admit, "His ideas represent something close to the reigning orthodoxy in Washington today and for the past two decades." He concluded by saying that the book was unconvincing and paralleled an essay Kagan co-wrote in 1996 with Bill Kristol entitled, Toward a Neo—Reaganite Foreign Policy, adding, "He didn't prove [his] case before, and he doesn’t now."

=== Positive reviews ===
On the other hand, Publishers Weekly described the book as "intelligent, cogent, and timely." Similarly, writing for Foreign Affairs, Bard College Professor Walter Russell Mead praised the book, saying, "As usual, Kagan's writing bristles with insights and ideas." In The Financial Times, Gideon Rachman called it "a spirited essay." He described the first two-thirds of the book as "fluently argued and [...] quite powerful," but added that the last part was "less convincing."

Writing for the New Statesman, Mark Leonard described the book as an "elegant and perceptive essay." In the Pittsburgh Post-Gazette, Mark DeSantis called it an "accessible, thought-provoking and extraordinary (short) book."

In the Seattle Post-Intelligencer, Dr Joseph S. Maresca called it "an important book about America's role in the world." He added that it was "easy to read" and "directed to a wide audience in government, industry, and the general public."
