= The Jungle Grows Back =

2018 book by Robert Kagan

The Jungle Grows Back: America and Our Imperiled World
- First edition
- Author: Robert Kagan
- Language: English
- Genre: Non-fiction
- Publisher: Alfred A. Knopf
- Publication date: 2018
- Publication place: United States

The Jungle Grows Back: America and Our Imperiled World is a 2018 book by American historian and foreign policy commentator Robert Kagan, published by Alfred A. Knopf. The book's argument is that the world order created by the United States in the wake of World War II is being overrun by jungle-like chaos.
