= While America Sleeps =

Book by Donald Kagan & Frederick Kagan

While America Sleeps: Self-Delusion, Military Weakness, and the Threat to Peace Today
- Author: Donald Kagan, Frederick Kagan
- Language: English
- Genre: Non-fiction
- Publisher: St. Martin's Press
- Publication date: September 2000
- Publication place: United States
- ISBN: 0-312-20624-0

While America Sleeps: Self-Delusion, Military Weakness, and the Threat to Peace Today is a book by Donald Kagan and Frederick Kagan, published September 2000. They argue for a policy of strengthening U.S. defense and a willingness to use force. Michael Lind has argued that the book contributed to neoconservative thought in U.S. foreign policy.

== Title ==
Two similarly titled works were published around the time of World War II: While England Slept (1938), by future British Prime Minister Winston Churchill, and Why England Slept (1940), by future U.S. President John F. Kennedy, at the time a Harvard University undergraduate student.

== Bibliography ==
- Kagan, Donald and Frederick W. Kagan. While America Sleeps: Self-Delusion, Military Weakness, and the Threat to Peace Today. St. Martin's Press: September 2000. ISBN 0-312-20624-0
