= The Politic =

Yale University student publication

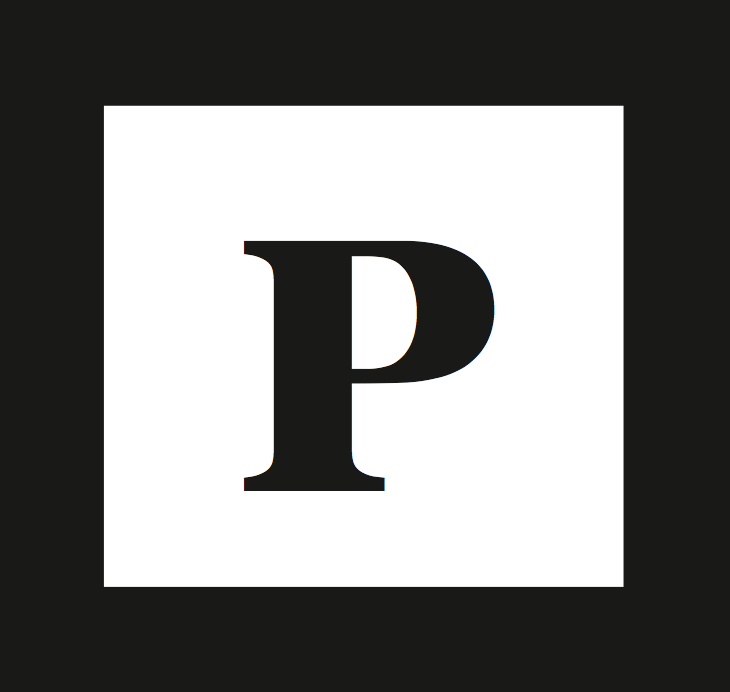
- Editors-In-Chief: Hanna Klingbeil Canale; Pola Jancewicz
- Categories: American Politics, International Relations
- Frequency: Monthly
- Publisher: The Politic, Inc.
- Founded: 1947
- Country: United States
- Based in: New Haven, Connecticut
- Website: http://www.thepolitic.org

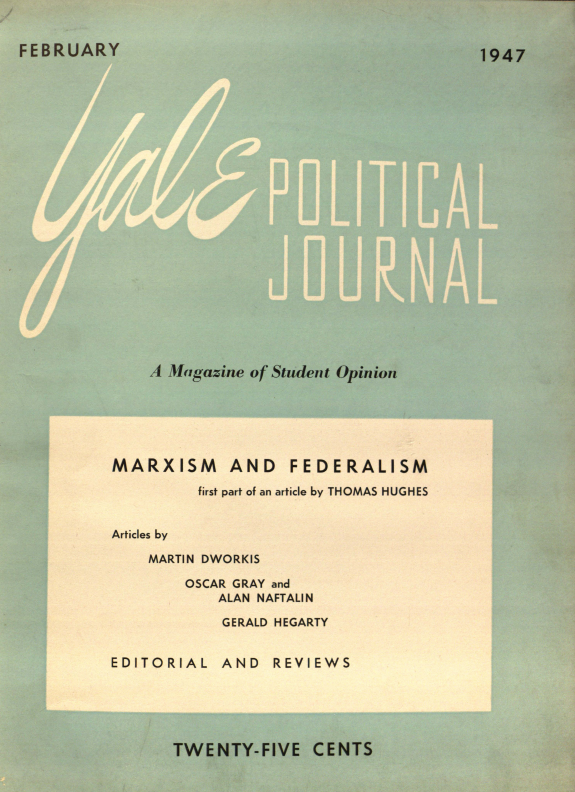
The Yale Political Journal's first issue, published in February 1947.

The Politic: The Yale College Journal of Politics is a bi-monthly Yale University student publication started in 1947, when the Yale Political Journal: A Magazine of Student Opinion was founded. The magazine was revived in 1979 as the Yale Political Monthly by political commentator and historian Robert Kagan. It was also and known as Yale Political Magazine for twenty years.

In addition to Kagan, past Editors-in-Chief include author and CNN host Fareed Zakaria, Foreign Affairs Editor-in-Chief Gideon Rose and U.S. Representative Maggie Goodlander.

== History ==
In 1947, a group of undergraduate students started the Yale Political Journal: A Magazine of Student Opinion, or the Journal for short. In their first issue, the founding editors wrote:

"We have coined as our by-line, 'a magazine of student opinion' presupposing that student opinion is worthy of separation from the attitudes of other groups and that it is worthy as well of attention and study.”

The publication remained dormant for a period of time, after which in 1979, Kagan revived it under a new name, Yale Political Monthly. At the time, Kagan was "frustrated that things tended to be one sided" at Yale, and he sought to provide a non-partisan platform for debate on campus. Students relaunched the publication again in 2001, this time as The Politic, in response to increased interest in politics on campus following the 2000 presidential election.

== Other projects ==
The Politic has also expanded beyond the monthly magazine. In 2014, The Politic interviewed more than 100 diplomats and published the collection as a book, Diplomatic Discourse. Ahead of the 2016 presidential election, The Politic surveyed Yale students from all fifty states for their impressions of and predictions for the election and published them in an interactive map. In 2017, The Politic released its first documentary, Resettled: New Haven's Refugee Community, which won the Best Student Film Award at the NHDocs Film Festival.

In September 2018, The Politic released its second documentary, 120 YEARS, which tells the story of Scott Lewis' wrongful conviction and ultimate exoneration after 20 years of incarceration. The documentary won the Human Rights Award at the Mystic Film Festival in October 2018 and Best Short Documentary Film at the 27th annual Pan African Film Festival (PAFF) in February 2019.

The Politic regularly hosts events as part of a speaker series, The Politic Presents, for the Yale community. Past guests have included John Dickerson, Susan Glasser, Christiane Amanpour, Norman Ornstein, Jake Sullivan, Salman Rushdie, Jeffrey Sachs, Ken Burns, Jesse Jackson, Retired Gen. James Cartwright, and Malcolm Gladwell.

The Politic also conducts interviews with a range of prominent public figures such as Fareed Zakaria, Ezra Klein, Mark Cuban, Christiane Amanpour, Frank Bruni, Malcolm Gladwell, Jeb Bush, Dan Ariely, Jonathan Haidt, Ron Paul, Jeffrey Toobin, David Brooks, Ben Carson, Jake Sullivan, Rush Holt, Jr., Martin O'Malley, Michael Dukakis, Russ Feingold, Gretchen Carlson, Gina Raimondo, and Jake Tapper.

The Politic interviewed four 2020 presidential candidates: Cory Booker, Pete Buttigieg, Amy Klobuchar, and Andrew Yang.

== Alumni ==
- Robert Kagan
- Gideon Rose
- Fareed Zakaria
