= James Dubik =

American Lieutenant General

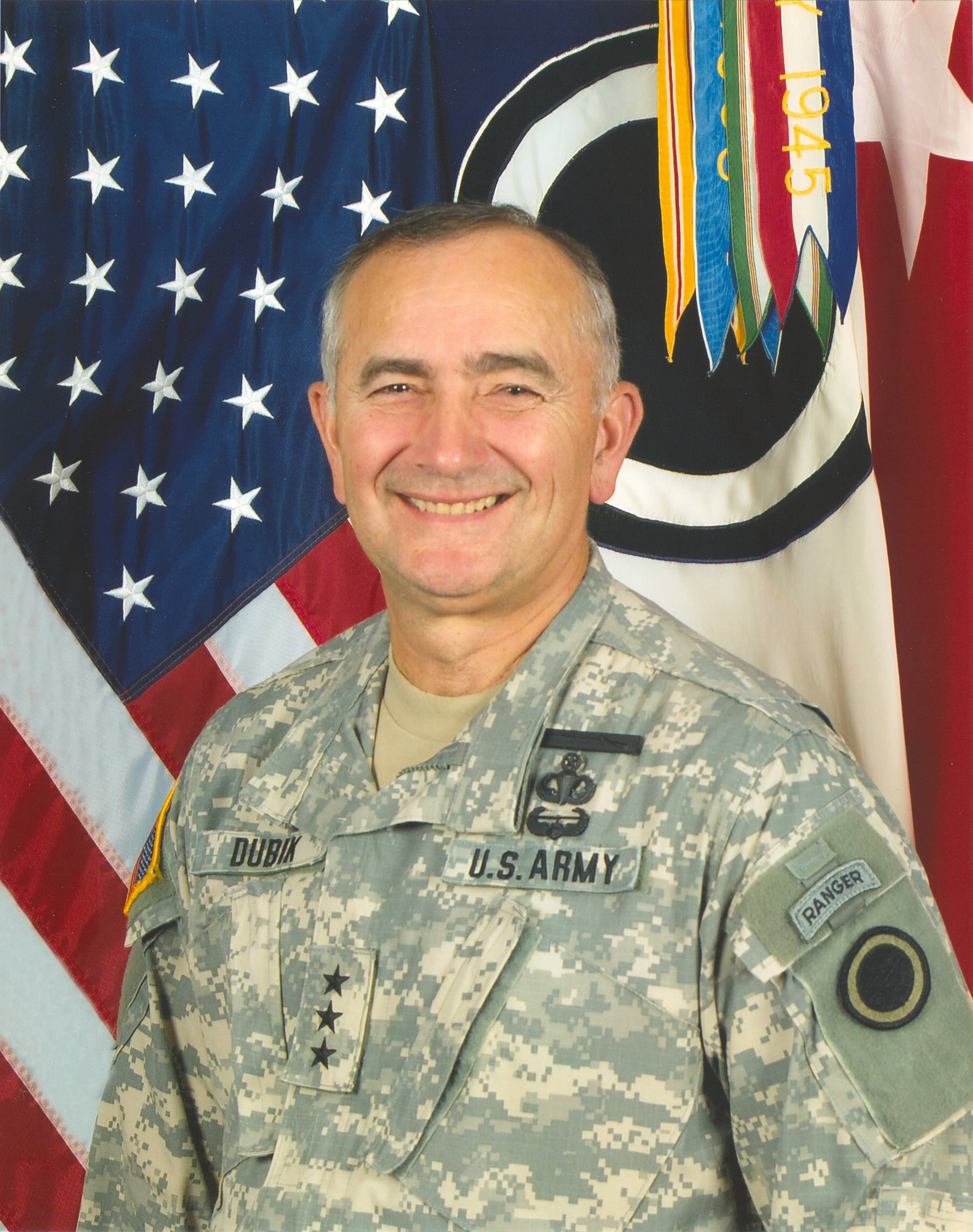
- Born: December 6, 1949 (age 76)
- Military career
- Allegiance: United States
- Service: United States Army
- Service years: 1971–2008
- Rank: Lieutenant General
- Nickname: Jim
- Other work: Writer; Philosophy professor
- Website: twitter.com/ltgrdubik

Lieutenant General James Michael Dubik (U.S. Army, Ret.) is a senior fellow at the Institute for the Study of War and a professor at Georgetown University's Security Studies Program. General Dubik has extensive operational experience in Iraq, Afghanistan, Japan, Korea, Thailand, Bosnia, Haiti, Panama, Honduras, and in many NATO countries.

His last job on active duty was as commanding general of the Multinational Security Transition Command-Iraq (MNSTC-I) and the NATO Training Mission-Iraq in 2007–2008. He is a member of the U.S. Army Ranger Hall of Fame and a distinguished member of the U.S. Army 75th Ranger Regiment.

General Dubik taught philosophy at West Point and campaign theory and practice at the U.S. Army School of Advanced Military Studies, Fort Leavenworth, Kansas. He has completed an MIT fellowship program for national security studies as well as executive programs in national security at Harvard's JFK School of Government and Syracuse University's Maxwell School of Citizenship and Public Affairs. He is the author, most recently, of Just War Reconsidered: Strategy, Ethics, and Theory.

== Education ==
Born on December 6, 1949, Dubik is a 1967 graduate of Cathedral Preparatory School in Erie, Pennsylvania. In 1971, he received a B.A. degree in philosophy from Gannon University in Erie. Dubik later received an M.A. degree in philosophy from Johns Hopkins University and a master's degree in Military Arts and Sciences from the Army Command and General Staff College at Fort Leavenworth, Kansas. After retiring from active duty, he completed a Ph.D. degree in philosophy at Johns Hopkins University in August 2014. His doctoral thesis was entitled Waging War: Filling the Gap in Just War Theory.

== Military career ==
Dubik served as commanding general for the Multi National Security Transition Command-Iraq.

Other command assignments include the 5th Battalion of the 14th Infantry Regiment, the 2nd Brigade of the 10th Mountain Division, and the 25th Infantry Division.

He taught philosophy at the United States Military Academy.

His military decorations include the Distinguished Service Medal, Defense Superior Service Medal, four awards of the Legion of Merit and five awards of the Meritorious Service Medal.

Dubik retired from the Army in 2008. He was inducted into the U.S. Army Ranger Hall of Fame in 2012.

== Civilian career ==
Dubik currently serves as the senior fellow at the Institute for the Study of War. He has written for various journals, including Foreign Policy magazine.

== Selected works ==
- Waging War and Using Force. Naval Institute Press, forthcoming.
- Just War Reconsidered: Strategy, Ethics, and Theory. Lexington, Kentucky : University Press of Kentucky, 2018. ISBN 0813175011 OCLC 1001533501
- Accelerating Combat Power in Afghanistan. 2009. OCLC 822967215
- Has Warfare Changed?: Sorting Apples from Oranges. Arlington, Va: Institute of Land Warfare, Association of the United States Army, 2002. OCLC 50556506
- The Army's "Twofer": The Dual Role of the Interim Force. Arlington, Va: Institute of Land Warfare, Association of the United States Army, 2001. OCLC 48215274
- With Gordon R. Sullivan. Envisioning Future Warfare 1995. Reissued in 2003. OCLC 53114595

== Personal life ==
Dubik lives in Arlington, Virginia.
