= NPI Media =

British publishing group

- Founder: Alan Sutton
- Successor: The History Press
- Country of origin: United Kingdom
- Publication types: Books

NPI Media Group was a publishing group set up by UK publisher Alan Sutton.

The group's business was acquired by The History Press in 2007, amid a number of authors being owed royalty payments by the NPI Media Group.

The History Press, backed by NPI's private equity partner Octopus Investments, acquired all NPI's existing imprints (Pathfinder, Phillimore, Pitkin, Spellmount, Stadia, Sutton, Tempus and Nonsuch) together with all the existing titles, plus all the future contracts and the publishing rights contained in them.

Tony Morris, CEO of NPI Media became CEO of The History Press at the time of the acquisition. The History Press has since reorganised the group and grown to hold approximately 70% of the UK market for local history publishing.
