= Of Paradise and Power =

2003 book by Robert Kagan

Of Paradise and Power: America and Europe in the New World Order
- Author: Robert Kagan
- Language: English
- Subject: Euro-American relations, Foreign policy of the United States
- Genre: Nonfiction
- Publisher: Alfred A. Knopf
- Publication date: 2003
- Publication place: United States
- Media type: Hardcover
- Pages: 112
- ISBN: 978-1-4000-4093-3
- OCLC: 51274548

Of Paradise and Power: America and Europe in the New World Order is an essay by Robert Kagan which attempts to explicate the differing approaches that the United States and the nations of Europe take towards the conduct of foreign policy. Kagan argues that the two have different philosophical outlooks on the use of power, which are the natural consequence of the United States' possession of power and the Europeans' lack of it.

Initially published in Policy Review magazine, the essay was widely read and the subject of extensive debate and commentary in both America and Europe. In terms of its impact, it was compared by reviewers to Francis Fukuyama's The End of History and the Last Man, Samuel P. Huntington's The Clash of Civilizations, and even George Kennan's X Article.

Of Paradise and Power was a bestseller in multiple countries. It was a New York Times bestseller for ten weeks. It was also a bestseller in the United Kingdom, France, Germany, Spain, Italy, the Netherlands, and Canada. It has been translated into more than 25 languages.
