= The Surge: A Military History =

- Author: Kimberly Kagan
- Language: English
- Subject: Iraq War troop surge of 2007
- Genre: Nonfiction: Military history
- Publisher: Encounter Books
- Publication date: October 2008
- Publication place: United States
- Media type: Hardcover
- Pages: 282
- ISBN: 978-1-59403-249-3
- OCLC: 227030629
- Dewey Decimal: 956.7044/342 22
- LC Class: DS79.76 .K33 2009

The Surge: A Military History is a military history by Kimberly Kagan about the Iraq War troop surge of 2007. The book describes events in Iraq starting from late 2006, before the surge, to early 2008, focusing on the details of military operations on a week by week basis. It was described as "indispensable guide" to the understanding of American military successes in Iraq by Senator John McCain.

The book focuses on "operational art" rather than grand strategy or the personal emotional experiences of combat. The book devotes separate chapters to operations in different areas, proceeding in an approximately chronological fashion, giving attention to operations conducted at the brigade and battalion level, as well as decisions undertaken at higher levels such as those by General Odierno in Operation Phantom Thunder.

Although the book was marred by stylistic and grammatical errors, it was considered by reviewers to be "essential reading" and a "valuable resource" for military professionals, although one reviewer warned that it was not for the casual reader. It was criticized for not giving attention to the role of new technologies in tracking operations as they unfolded.
