= Robert Kagan =

American columnist and historian (born 1958)

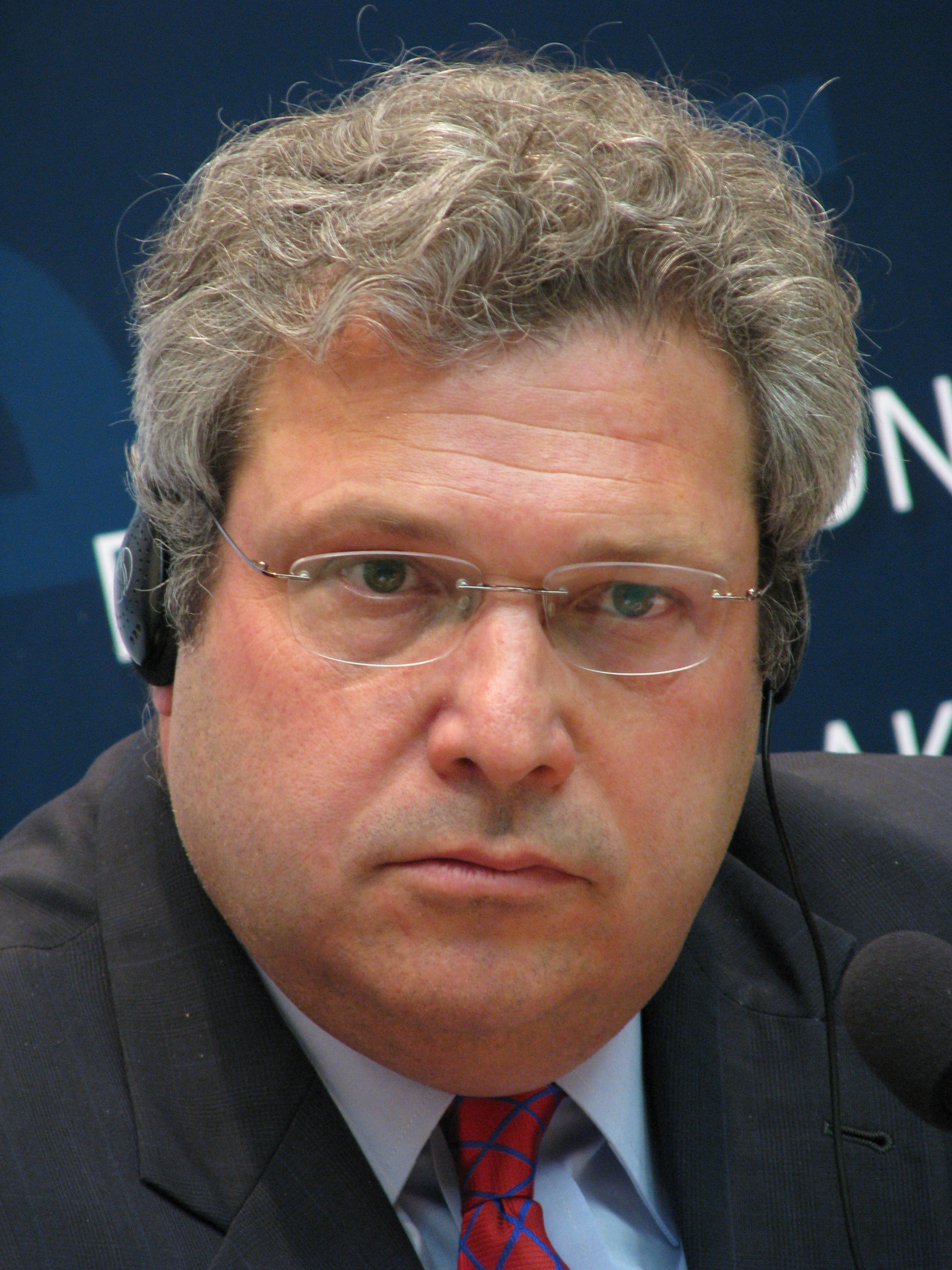
- Kagan in 2008
- Born: September 26, 1958 (age 68); Athens, Greece
- Education: Yale University (BA); Harvard University (MPP); American University (PhD)
- Occupations: Columnist, political scientist
- Political party: Republican (before 2016); Independent (since 2016)
- Spouse: Victoria Nuland
- Relatives: Donald Kagan (father); Frederick Kagan (brother)

Signature
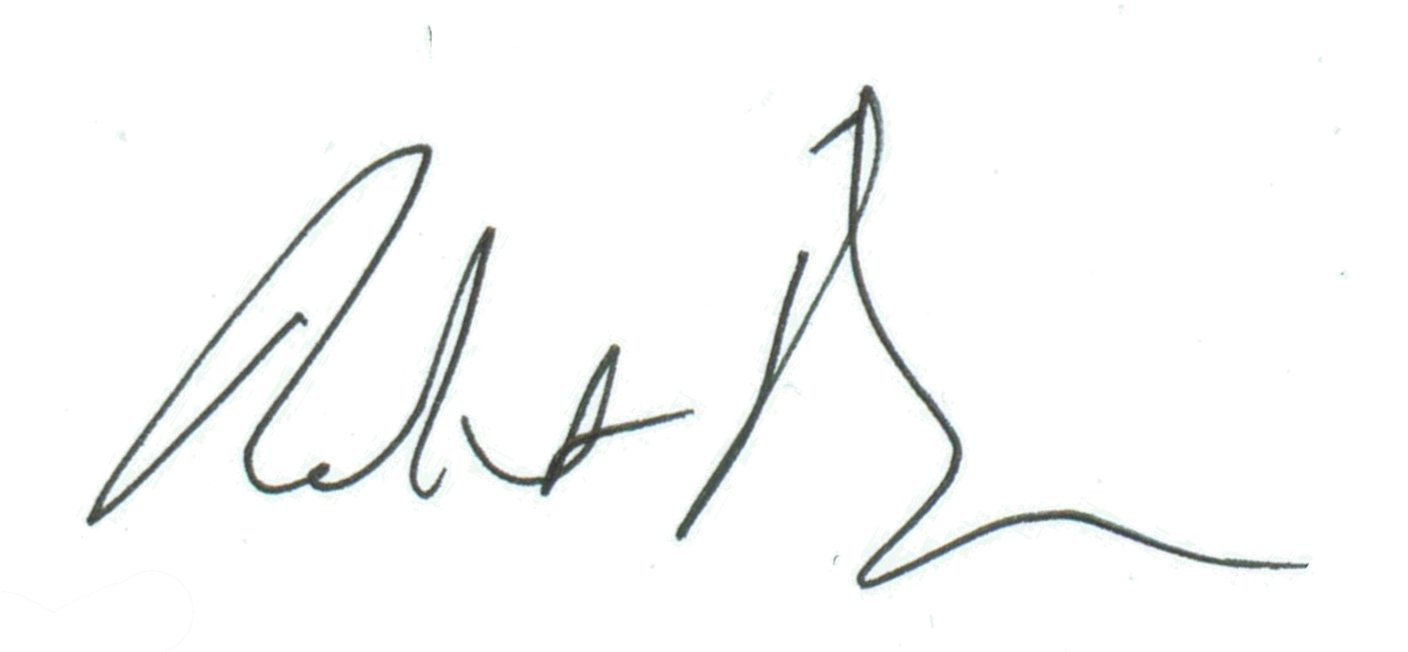

Robert Kagan (/ˈkeɪɡən/; born September 26, 1958) is an American columnist, neoconservative scholar, and U.S. foreign policy analyst and commentator. He is a leading advocate of liberal internationalism.

A co-founder of the neoconservative Project for the New American Century, Kagan is a senior fellow at the Brookings Institution. He has been a foreign policy adviser to U.S. Republican presidential candidates as well as Democratic administrations via the Foreign Affairs Policy Board.

Kagan wrote a monthly column on world affairs for The Washington Post. During the 2016 U.S. presidential election campaign, he left the Republican Party due to the party's nomination of Donald Trump and endorsed the Democratic candidate, Hillary Clinton, for president.

== Personal life and education ==
Kagan was born in Athens, Greece. His father, historian Donald Kagan, of Lithuanian Jewish descent, was the Sterling Professor of Classics and History Emeritus at Yale University and a specialist in the history of the Peloponnesian War. His brother Frederick is a military historian and author. Kagan has a B.A. in history (1980) from Yale, where in 1979 he was editor-in-chief of the Yale Political Monthly, a periodical he is credited with reviving. He later earned a master's in public policy from Harvard's Kennedy School of Government and a PhD in American history from American University in Washington, D.C.

Kagan is married to American diplomat Victoria Nuland, who previously served as deputy national security advisor to Vice President Dick Cheney and assistant secretary of state for European and Eurasian affairs in the Obama administration.

== Career ==
In 1983, Kagan was foreign policy advisor to New York Republican Representative Jack Kemp. From 1984 to 1986, under the administration of Ronald Reagan, he was a speechwriter for Secretary of State George P. Shultz and a member of the United States Department of State Policy Planning Staff. From 1986 to 1988, he served in the State Department Bureau of Inter-American Affairs.

In 1997, Kagan co-founded the now-defunct neoconservative think tank Project for the New American Century with William Kristol. Through the work of the PNAC, from 1998, Kagan was an early and strong advocate of military action in Syria, Iran and Afghanistan, as well as to “remove Mr. Hussein and his regime from power” in Iraq. After the 1998 bombing of Iraq was announced Kagan said “bombing Iraq isn't enough” and called on Clinton to send ground troops to Iraq.

From 1998 until August 2010, Kagan was a Senior Associate with the Carnegie Endowment for International Peace. He was appointed senior fellow in the Center on United States and Europe at the Brookings Institution in September 2010.

During the 2008 presidential campaign he served as foreign policy advisor to John McCain, the Republican Party's nominee for President of the United States in the 2008 election.

Since 2011, Kagan has also served on the twenty-five-member State Department's Foreign Affairs Policy Board under Secretaries of State Hillary Clinton and John Kerry.

Andrew Bacevich referred to Kagan as “the chief neoconservative foreign-policy theorist” in reviewing Kagan's book The Return of History and the End of Dreams.

A profile in The Guardian described Kagan as being “uncomfortable” with the “neocon” title, and stated that “he insists he is ‘liberal’ and ‘progressive’ in a distinctly American tradition.”

In 2008, Kagan wrote an article titled “Neocon Nation: Neoconservatism, c. 1776” for World Affairs, describing the main components of American neoconservatism as a belief in the rectitude of applying U.S. moralism to the world stage, support for the U.S. to act alone, the promotion of American-style liberty and democracy in other countries, the belief in American hegemony, confidence in U.S. military power, and a distrust of international institutions. According to Kagan, his foreign-policy views are “deeply rooted in American history and widely shared by Americans”.

In 2006, Kagan wrote that Russia and China are the greatest “challenge liberalism faces today”: “Nor do Russia and China welcome the liberal West's efforts to promote liberal politics around the globe, least of all in regions of strategic importance to them. ... Unfortunately, al-Qaeda may not be the only challenge liberalism faces today, or even the greatest.” In a February 2017 essay for Foreign Policy, Kagan argued that U.S. post-Cold War retrenchment in global affairs has emboldened Russia and China, “the two great revisionist powers”, and will eventually lead to instability and conflict.

In October 2018, Kagan said, “Unless you are willing to punish” Saudi Arabia for the assassination of Jamal Khashoggi, “then they own you.”

== Writings ==
External videos
- Booknotes interview with Kagan on Of Paradise and Power, February 16, 2003, C-SPAN
- Presentation by Kagan on Dangerous Nation, October 18, 2006, C-SPAN
- Washington Journal interview with Kagan on Dangerous Nation, October 23, 2006, C-SPAN
- Q&A interview with Kagan on Dangerous Nation, March 4, 2007, C-SPAN

Kagan was a columnist for The Washington Post. He has also written for The New York Times, Foreign Affairs, The Wall Street Journal, Commentary, World Affairs, and Policy Review.

In 2003, Kagan's book Of Paradise and Power: America and Europe in the New World Order, published on the eve of the U.S. invasion of Iraq, created something of a sensation through its assertions that Europeans tended to favor peaceful resolutions of international disputes while the United States takes a more "Hobbesian" view in which certain kinds of disagreement can only be settled by force, or, as he put it: "Americans are from Mars and Europe is from Venus." A New York Times book reviewer, Ivo H. Daalder wrote:

When it comes to setting national priorities, determining threats, defining challenges, and fashioning and implementing foreign and defense policies, the United States and Europe have parted ways, writes Mr. Kagan, concluding, in words already famous in another context, "Americans are from Mars and Europeans are from Venus."

In Dangerous Nation: America's Place in the World from Its Earliest Days to the Dawn of the Twentieth Century (2006) Kagan argued forcefully against what he considers the widespread misconception that the United States had been isolationist since its inception. Dangerous Nation was awarded the 2007 Lepgold Prize by Georgetown University.

Kagan's essay "Not Fade Away: The Myth of American Decline" (The New Republic, February 2, 2012) was very positively received by President Obama. Josh Rogin reported in Foreign Policy that the president "spent more than ten minutes talking about it ... going over its arguments paragraph by paragraph." The essay was excerpted from Kagan's book The World America Made (2012).

John Bew and Kagan lectured on March 27, 2014, on Realpolitik and American exceptionalism at the Library of Congress.

=== Criticism of Donald Trump ===
In February 2016, Kagan publicly left the Republican party (referring to himself as a "former Republican"), endorsing Democrat Hillary Clinton for president. He argued that the Republican Party's "wild obstructionism" and an insistence that "government, institutions, political traditions, party leadership and even parties themselves" were things meant to be "overthrown, evaded, ignored, insulted, laughed at" set the stage for the rise of Donald Trump. Kagan called Trump a "Frankenstein monster" and compared him to Napoleon. In May 2016, Kagan wrote an opinion piece in The Washington Post regarding Trump's campaign titled "This is how fascism comes to America". Kagan has said that "all Republican foreign policy professionals are anti-Trump." In September 2021, Kagan wrote a related opinion essay published in The Washington Post by the title "Our constitutional crisis is already here". He continued his criticism of Trump in November 2023 with another essay in The Washington Post titled "A Trump Dictatorship Is Increasingly Inevitable. We Should Stop Pretending."

In October 2024, he resigned as editor-at-large from the Post due to its decision not to endorse a candidate in the 2024 United States presidential election between Trump and Kamala Harris.

== Select bibliography ==
- A Twilight Struggle: American Power and Nicaragua, 1977–1990 (1996). ISBN 978-0-028-74057-7.
- Present Dangers: Crisis and Opportunity in America's Foreign and Defense Policy, with William Kristol (2000). ISBN 1-893554-16-3.
- Of Paradise and Power: America and Europe in the New World Order (2003). ISBN 1-4000-4093-0.
- Dangerous Nation: America's Place in the World from Its Earliest Days to the Dawn of the Twentieth Century (2006). ISBN 0-375-41105-4.
- The Return of History and the End of Dreams (2008). ISBN 978-0-307-26923-2.
- The World America Made (2012). ISBN 978-0-307-96131-0.
- The Jungle Grows Back: America and Our Imperiled World (2018). ISBN 978-0525521655.
- The Ghost at the Feast: America and the Collapse of World Order, 1900-1941 (2023). ISBN 978-0307262943.
- Rebellion: How Antiliberalism Is Tearing America Apart—Again (2024). ISBN 978-0593535783.

== See also ==
- Stop Trump movement
