= Robin D. S. Higham =

Anglo-American historian (1925–2015)

- Robin D. S. Higham
- Born: June 20, 1925; London
- Died: August 27, 2015 (aged 90); Manhattan, Kansas
- Spouse: Barbara Davies
- Military career
- Awards: Samuel Eliot Morison Prize for Lifetime Achievement in 1985, Victor Gondos Award in 1986
- Other work: aerospace and military historian

Robin David Stewart Higham (June 20, 1925 – August 27, 2015) was a British-American historian, specializing in aerospace and military history, who also served as a pilot with the Royal Canadian Air Force during World War II.

== Early life and family ==
Higham was born to a British veteran of the First World War (the literary agent, David Higham) and Margaret Anne Stewart, an American woman. Born in 1925, he grew up in London but had already met relatives in Texas and Oklahoma with his mother in 1929 and 1935. Following the outbreak of the Battle of Britain in 1940, Higham's parents sent him to the United States. He attended the Hotchkiss School in Connecticut.

== Education and career ==
From 1943 to 1947, he served as a pilot and flight sergeant in the Royal Canadian Air Force in Europe and Asia (Burma Road).

He studied at the University of New Hampshire and Harvard University, where he graduated with a bachelor's degree in 1950 cum laude. In 1953, he received his master's degree at Claremont Graduate University in California.

From 1954 to 1957, he was an instructor at the University of Massachusetts. Higham received a PhD in 1957 from Harvard with a dissertation on the development of aviation in Great Britain. For the next six years, until 1963, he was an assistant professor at the University of North Carolina, where he was co-founder of the National Security Seminar of Duke University and University of North Carolina. In 1963, he became a professor at Kansas State University. He became professor emeritus there in 1999.

Though he described himself as a "historical generalist" in a 1998 interview, Higham's primary publications were on the subject of aeronautics, especially military-scientific aspects. He did, however, also write extensively on geopolitics in general.

In 1977, he founded Sunflower University Press, which existed until 2005 and published books on military science and military history.

He was editor of Military Affairs (now The Journal of Military History) from 1968 to 1988 and of Aerospace Historian from 1970 to 1988. He was also the editor of the Journal of the West beginning in 1976.

== Awards and honors ==
Higham was a member in many aviation and military history organizations. His honors from these groups included the Social Science Research Council National Security Policy Research Fellowship, 1960–1961. In 1985, he received the first Samuel Eliot Morison Prize for Lifetime Achievement from the Society for Military History. In 1986, Higham received the Victor Gondos Award (now The Edwin H. Simmons Award) for his outstanding service to the Society for Military History.

== Personal life ==
He married Barbara Davies on August 5, 1950. They had a son and three daughters. He lived in Manhattan, Kansas. Higham became an American citizen in 1959.

== Selected publications ==
- Introduction to military, naval and aeronautical history. 1960.
- Britain's Imperial Air Routes 1918 to 1939: The Story of Britain's Overseas Airlines. G.T. Foulis. 1960. OCLC 2233645.
- British rigid airship. G. T. Foulis. 1961. OCLC 655243407.
- Military intellectuals in Britain, 1918–1939. 1966.
- A Short History of Warfare (with David Hartzler Zook) 1966
- A guide to the Sources of British Military History. University of California Press. 1971. ISBN 0520016742. OCLC 267375.
- Airpower: a Concise History. St. Martin's Press. 1972. OCLC 539893.
- Complete academic: An informal guide to the ivory tower. 1974.
- Intervention or abstention: the dilemma of American foreign policy. University Press of Kentucky. 1975. ISBN 0813113172. OCLC 1637716.
- Diary of a disaster: British aid to Greece 1940–1941. 1986.
- The Writing of Official Military History. Greenwood Press. 1999. ISBN 0313308632. OCLC 40861935.
- 100 years of air power and aviation. Texas A & M University Press. 2003. ISBN 1585442410. OCLC 51763993.
- The French Air Force between the wars. F. Cass. 2004. ISBN 0714680117. OCLC 729770841.
- Flying American Combat Aircraft: the Cold War. Stackpole Books. 2005. ISBN 9780811732383. OCLC 58535900.
- Speedbird: the complete history of BOAC. I.B. Tauris. 2013. ISBN 9781780764627. OCLC 877473517.
- Two Roads to War: the French and British air arms from Versailles to Dunkirk. Naval Institute Press. 2012. ISBN 978-1612510583. OCLC 769232574.
- Unflinching Zeal: The Air Battles Over France and Britain, May–October 1940. Naval Institute Press. 2012. ISBN 9781612511115. OCLC 785079514.
