= Alan Sutton =

English publisher

Alan John Sutton (b. 1949) is an English publisher who founded Tempus Publishing, Alan Sutton Publishing, Amberley Publishing, and Fonthill Media.

== Career ==
Sutton was educated at Dursley Grammar School. He published his first book in 1974 and had his first success with The Diary of a Cotswold Parson (1978) by Francis Edward Witts (1783–1854). This covers the years 1783–1854 and was edited and introduced by David Verey. Sutton created the British Isles in Old Photographs series and its successor, the Images of England series. He also created the Images of America series, published by Arcadia Publishing in Charleston SC, in which more than 12,000 titles have been published.

Sutton founded Tempus Publishing in 1993, Alan Sutton Publishing, Amberley Publishing, and Fonthill Media.

Sutton was elected a fellow of the Society of Antiquaries of London in 2010.

== See also ==
- NPI Media
- The History Press
