= Steven Ozment =

American historian (1939–2019)

Steven Edgar Ozment (February 21, 1939 – December 12, 2019) was an American historian of early modern and modern Germany, the European family, and the Protestant Reformation. From 1990 to 2015, he was the McLean Professor of Ancient and Modern History at Harvard University, and Professor Emeritus until his death on December 12, 2019.

A son of Lowell Ozment and Shirley (Edgar) Ozment, he was born in McComb, Mississippi, and raised in Camden, Arkansas. He attended the University of Arkansas on a football scholarship, and transferred to Hendrix College after two years, and graduated with a BA in 1960. He obtained a Bachelor of Divinity degree at Drew Theological School in 1964, and a PhD at Harvard University in 1967. His dissertation, written under the supervision of Dutch intellectual historian Heiko Oberman, concerned the thought of Johannes Tauler, Jean Gerson and Martin Luther.

Ozment taught at the University of Tübingen, Germany, and at Yale University and Stanford University as well as Harvard. In 1977, he was awarded a Guggenheim Fellowship in the field of Renaissance history.

Ozment authored ten books. His Age of Reform, 1250–1550 (1980), based on his lecture notes for two survey courses at Yale, won the Schaff History Prize (1981) and was nominated for the 1981 National Book Award. Five of his books were selections of the History Book Club and several have been translated into European and Asian languages.

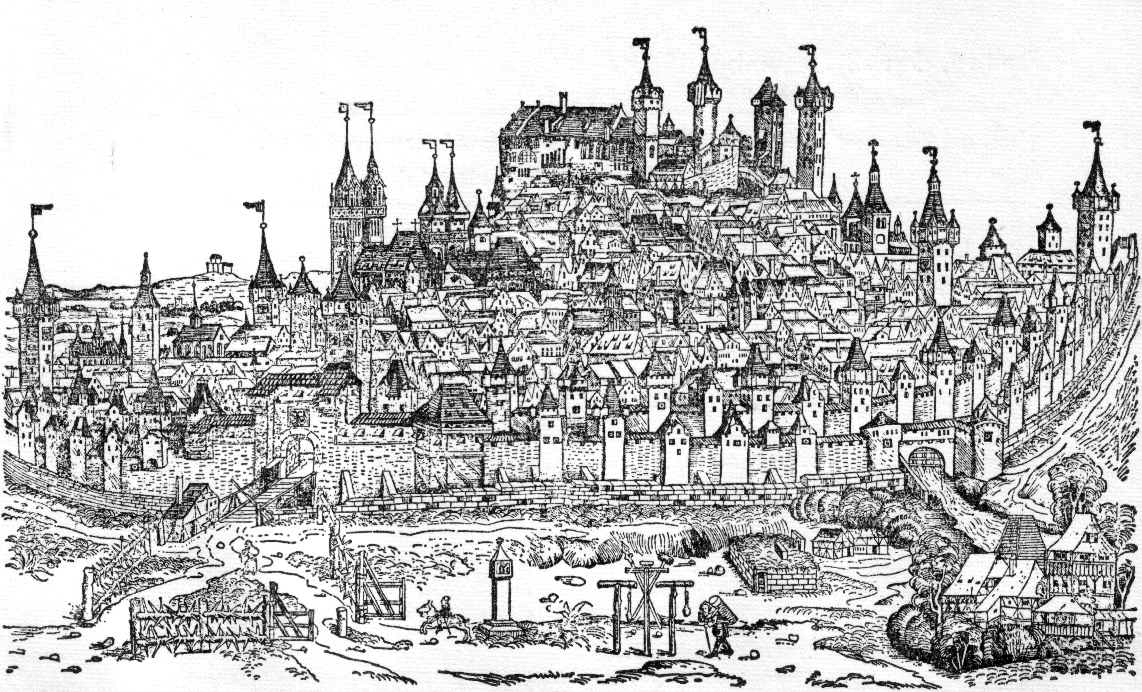
The cover of Ozment's A Mighty Fortress: A New History of the German People depicts medieval Nuremberg as shown in the Nuremberg Chronicle (here in grayscale)

A Mighty Fortress: A New History of the German People came out in 2005. Ozment's study of the world of German artist Lucas Cranach the Elder was published by Yale University Press in June, 2013, under the title, The Serpent and the Lamb: Cranach, Luther, and the Making of the Reformation.

Ozment was married first to Elinor Pryor of Little Rock, with whom he had 3 of his children. He later married Andrea Foster of Norwich, NY and had 2 more children. They lived together in Newbury, MA, where Steven spent the majority of his academic life. He spent the last years of his life married to Susanna Schweizer.

== Major works ==
- Homo spiritualis: a comparative study of the anthropology of Johannes Tauler, Jean Gerson and Martin Luther (1509–16) in the context of their theological thought. Leiden: E.J. Brill, 1969.
- ed., Jean Gerson: selections from A Deo exivit, Contra curiositatem studentium and De mystica theologia speculative. Leiden: E.J. Brill, 1969.
- ed., The Reformation in Medieval Perspective. Chicago, IL: Quadrangle Books, 1971.
- Mysticism and Dissent: Religious Ideology and Social Protest in the Sixteenth Century. New Haven, CT: Yale University Press, 1973.
- The Reformation in the Cities: The Appeal of Protestantism to Sixteenth-Century Germany and Switzerland. New Haven, CT: Yale University Press, 1975; 1977.
- co-author, The Western Heritage. New York, NY: MacMillan, 1979; 1983; 1986; 1990; 1994; 1997; 2000; 2003.
- The Age of Reform, 1250–1550: An Intellectual and Religious History of Late Medieval and Reformation Europe. New Haven, CT: Yale University Press, 1980; 1981. (Reprinted with a new Forward in 2020.)
- ed., Reformation Europe: A Guide to Research. St. Louis, MO: Center for Reformation Research, 1982.
- When Fathers Ruled: Family Life in Reformation Europe. Cambridge, MA: Harvard University Press, 1983; 1985.
- co-author, The Heritage of World Civilizations. New York, NY: MacMillan, 1986; 1989; 1993; 1996; 1999; 2001; 2004.
- Magdalena and Balthasar: An Intimate Portrait of Life in 16th Century Europe Revealed in the Letters of a Nuremberg Husband and Wife. New York, NY: Simon & Schuster, 1986; New Haven, CT: Yale University Press, 1989.
- ed., Religion and Culture in the Renaissance and Reformation. Kirksville, MO: Sixteenth Century Journal Publishers, 1989.
- ed. & trans., Three Behaim Boys: Growing Up in Early Modern Germany. A Chronicle of Their Lives. New Haven, CT: Yale University Press, 1990.
- Protestants: The Birth Of a Revolution. New York, NY: Doubleday, 1993; 1994; London: HarperCollins, 1993.
- The Bürgermeister's Daughter: Scandal in a Sixteenth-Century German Town. New York, NY: St. Martin's Press, 1996; New York, NY: HarperCollins, 1997.
- Flesh and Spirit: A Study of Private Life in Early Modern Germany. New York, NY: Viking/Penguin, 1999; 2001.
- Ancestors: The Loving Family in Old Europe. Cambridge, MA: Harvard University Press, 2001.
- A Mighty Fortress: A New History of the German People. New York, NY: HarperCollins, 2004; 2005; London: Granta, 2005.
- The Serpent and the Lamb: Cranach, Luther, and the Making of the Reformation. New Haven, CT: Yale University Press, 2013.
