= Institute for the Study of War =

American think tank

- Abbreviation: ISW
- Formation: 2007; 19 years ago
- Type: Public policy think tank
- Legal status: 501(c)(3)
- Headquarters: 1400 16th St NW
- Location: Washington, D.C., United States
- President: Kimberly Kagan
- Board of directors: Jack Keane; Kimberly Kagan; Kelly Craft; William Kristol; Kevin Mandia; Jack D. McCarthy, Jr.; Bruce Mosler; David H. Petraeus; Warren R. Phillips; William Roberti; Hudson La Force; Jennifer London
- Website: understandingwar.org

The Institute for the Study of War (ISW) is an American advocacy think tank founded in 2007 by military historian Kimberly Kagan and headquartered in Washington, D.C. ISW has provided analysis of modern armed conflicts and foreign affairs, including the Gaza war, Syrian civil war, the war in Afghanistan, the war in Iraq, the 2026 Iran war and the Russo-Ukrainian war. ISW's political stance has been described as ″hawkish″ and neoconservative. Major contributors to its funding include leading military contractors.

== Political stance and influence ==
The political stance of ISW has been described as "hawkish" by journalists at Politico, Time, Wired, Vox, The Guardian, and NPR. ISW has been described as neoconservative by writers for Business Day, The Nation, Arab Studies Quarterly, Strategic Studies Quarterly, The Hankyoreh and Foreign Policy. James A. Russell, writing in the journal Small Wars & Insurgencies, described the think tank as neoconservative and right wing, comparing the organization to The Heritage Foundation and The Washington Institute for Near East Policy. Matthew Blackburn, writing for Responsible Statecraft, described ISW as both "hawkish and neoconservative", saying that it is "funded by important military contractors in America’s military industrial complex such as General Dynamics, DynCorps International, and CACI International", and denounced ISW's reports concerning the Russia-Ukraine war as "defeatist propaganda" in service of military escalation. The Washington Post has described the group as favoring an "aggressive foreign policy". Writing for The Intercept, journalist Robert Wright described the think tank as "ultra-hawkish" and its objectivity as "dubious".

ISW criticized both the Obama and first Trump administration policies on the Syrian conflict, advocating a more hawkish approach. In 2013, Kagan called for arms and equipment to be supplied to "moderate" rebels, with the hope that a state "friendly to the United States [would emerge] in the wake of Assad." In 2017, ISW analyst Christopher Kozak praised president Donald Trump for the Shayrat missile strike but advocated further attacks, stating that "deterrence is a persistent condition, not a one hour strike package." In 2018, ISW analyst Jennifer Cafarella published an article calling for the use of offensive military force against the Assad government.

== Personnel ==
=== Governance ===
The ISW board includes General Jack Keane, military historian Kimberly Kagan, former US Ambassador to the UN Kelly Craft, William Kristol, Kevin Mandia, Jack D. McCarthy, Jr., Bruce Mosler, General David Petraeus, Warren Phillips, William Roberti, Edouard Matitia Cohen, Hudson La Force, James Gilmore III, and Jennifer London.

ISW maintains close ties with the United States military and the defense industry, and major contributors to the think tank have included General Dynamics, Raytheon, CACI and DynCorp. ISW founder Kimberly Kagan participated formally on the Joint Campaign Plan Assessment Team for Multi-National Force – Iraq U.S. Mission – Iraq in October 2008, and as part of the Civilian Advisory Team for the CENTCOM strategic review in January 2009. Kagan served in Kabul as a member of General Stanley McChrystal's strategic assessment team, composed of civilian experts, during his strategic review in June and July 2009. She and her husband Frederick returned to Afghanistan in the summer of 2010 to assist General Petraeus with key transition tasks following his assumption of command in Afghanistan.

== Research ==
=== Afghanistan Project ===
The ISW's Afghanistan Project monitors and analyzes the effectiveness of Afghan and Coalition operations to disrupt enemy networks and secure the population, while also evaluating the results of Afghanistan's 2010 Presidential election.

The Afghanistan Project remains focused on the main enemy groups in Afghanistan, specifically: the Quetta Shura Taliban, the Haqqani network, and Hizb-i Islami Gulbuddin. Specific attention is paid to understanding the ethnic, tribal, and political dynamics within these areas and how these factors are manipulated by the enemy and misunderstood by the Coalition.

In 2010, ISW researchers testified before the United States Congress in regards to understanding the problems of corruption and use of local powerbrokers in ISAF's Afghanistan strategy.

=== Iraq Project ===
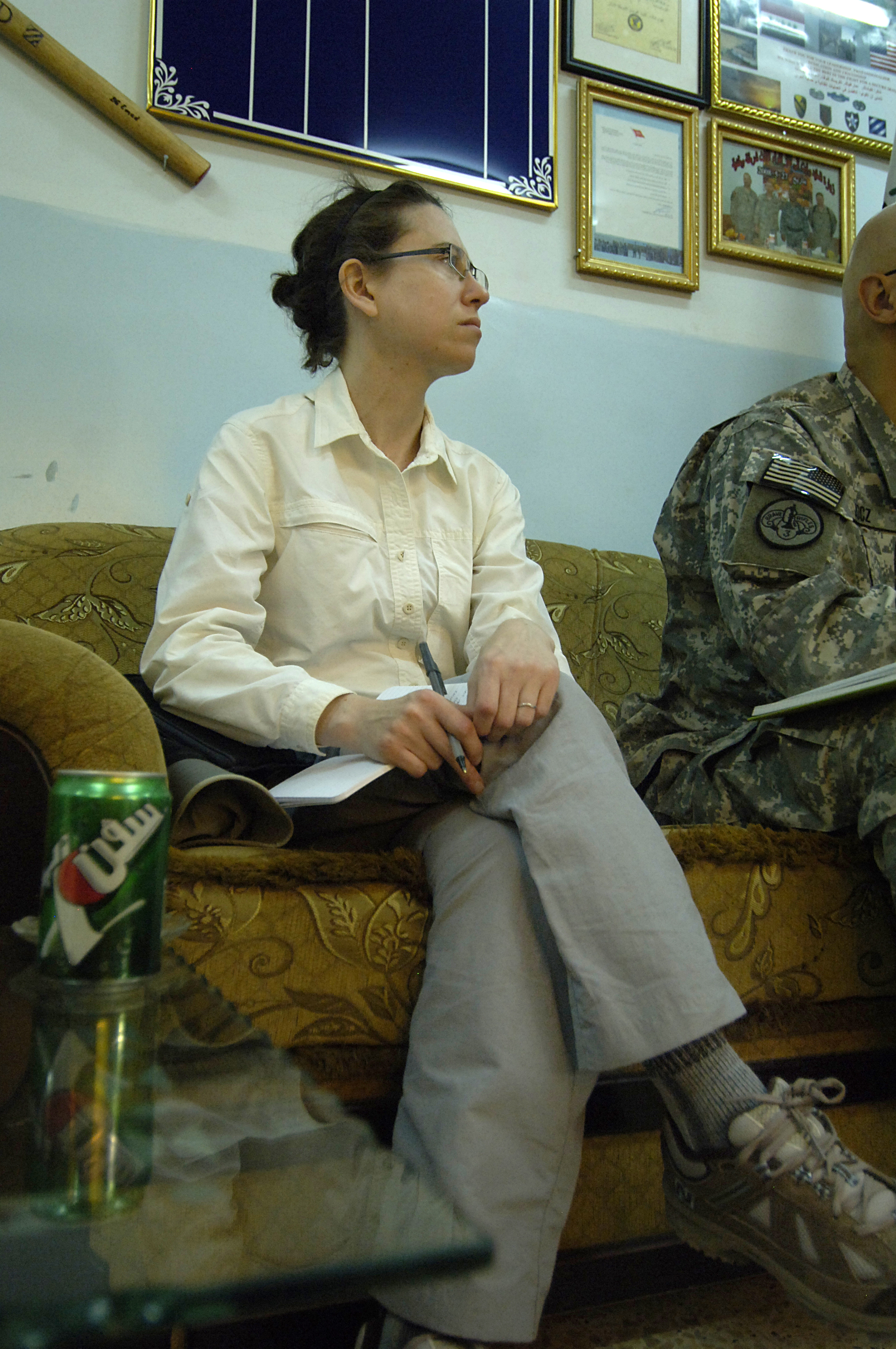
Kimberly Kagan in Iraq, 2008

The Iraq Project at the ISW produces reports about the security and political dynamics within Iraq. Notably a conversation by Jessica Lewis and LTG James M. Dubik at an EPIC event in 2014 to speak about the proliferation of ISIS within Iraq and the role Iraqi Security forces could play in keeping ISIS in check.

==== The Surge: The Untold Story ====
ISW president Kagan supported "the Surge" strategy in Iraq and argued for a restructured American military strategy more generally. The Surge: The Untold Story, co-produced by ISW provides an historical account of U.S. military operations in Iraq during the Surge of forces in 2007 and 2008. The documentary tells the story of the Surge in Iraq, as told by U.S. military commanders and diplomats as well as Iraqis.

The video documented the Iraq Surge as part of a population-centric counterinsurgency approach and features many of the top commanders and others responsible for its implementation—including Gen. Jack Keane (Ret.), Gen. David Petraeus, Amb. Ryan Crocker, Gen. Raymond Odierno, Gen. Nasier Abadi (Iraq), Col. Peter Mansoor (Ret.), Col. J.B. Burton, Col. Ricky Gibbs, Col. Bryan Roberts, Col. Sean MacFarland, Col. James Hickey, Col. David Sutherland, Col. Steven Townsend, Lt.-Col. James Crider, and Lt. James Danly (Ret.)

The Surge: The Untold Story was nominated for several awards and in 2010 was a winner of a Special Jury Award at the WorldFest film festival in Houston. It also won honors as the best documentary part of the Military Channel's Documentary Series at the GI Film Festival in Washington, D.C.

=== Middle East Security Project ===
The Institute for the Study of War launched its Middle East Security Project in November 2011. The project seeks: to study the national security challenges and opportunities emerging from the Persian Gulf and wider Arab World; to identify ways the United States and Gulf States can check Iran's growing influence and contain the threat posed by its nuclear ambitions; to explain the shifting balance of power within the Middle East caused by recent upheaval, and assess the responses of the United States and Arab States to address these changes as they emerge. The Project currently is focused on Syria and Iran, and also produced a series of reports during the Libyan Revolution.

==== Syria ====
ISW has chronicled the resistance to President Bashar al-Assad through a number of reports, including:

- The Struggle for Syria in 2011
- Syria's Armed Opposition
- Syria's Political Opposition
- Syria's Maturing Insurgency

==== Libya ====
ISW released four reports on the conflict that overthrew Muammar Gaddafi between September 19, 2011, and December 6, 2011. The series was entitled "The Libyan Revolution" with each of the four parts focused on different stages in the struggle in order to chronicle the revolution from start to finish.

==== Iran ====
The Middle East Security Project has released reports on the status of the Iranian military as well as the influence that Iran has on its neighbors in the region. These reports include "Iran's Two Navies" and "Iranian Influence in the Levant, Egypt, Iraq, and Afghanistan" which was co-written with the American Enterprise Institute.

=== Ukraine Project ===
The ISW has reported on the Russo-Ukrainian war, starting with Russian activities in the War in Donbas in 2014 and the later buildup of Russian forces for the invasion in 2022.

==== Russian Offensive Campaign Assessment ====
The ISW has also published daily updates on the war in Ukraine since the 2022 invasion in the form of their Russian Offensive Campaign Assessment where they disseminate reports from open sources. ISW's maps of the war have been republished by Reuters, the Financial Times, the BBC, The Guardian, The New York Times, The Washington Post, and The Independent.

404 Media reported that someone at ISW altered a map to show that Russia took the city of Myrnohrad by November 15, 2025, which led to the settlement of a Polymarket bet in favor of those who held that this advance would happen, despite no indication of Russia making the advance. The edit disappeared the next day, and the ISW released a statement saying that the misleading edit had been made without permission. ‌
